= Mobian =

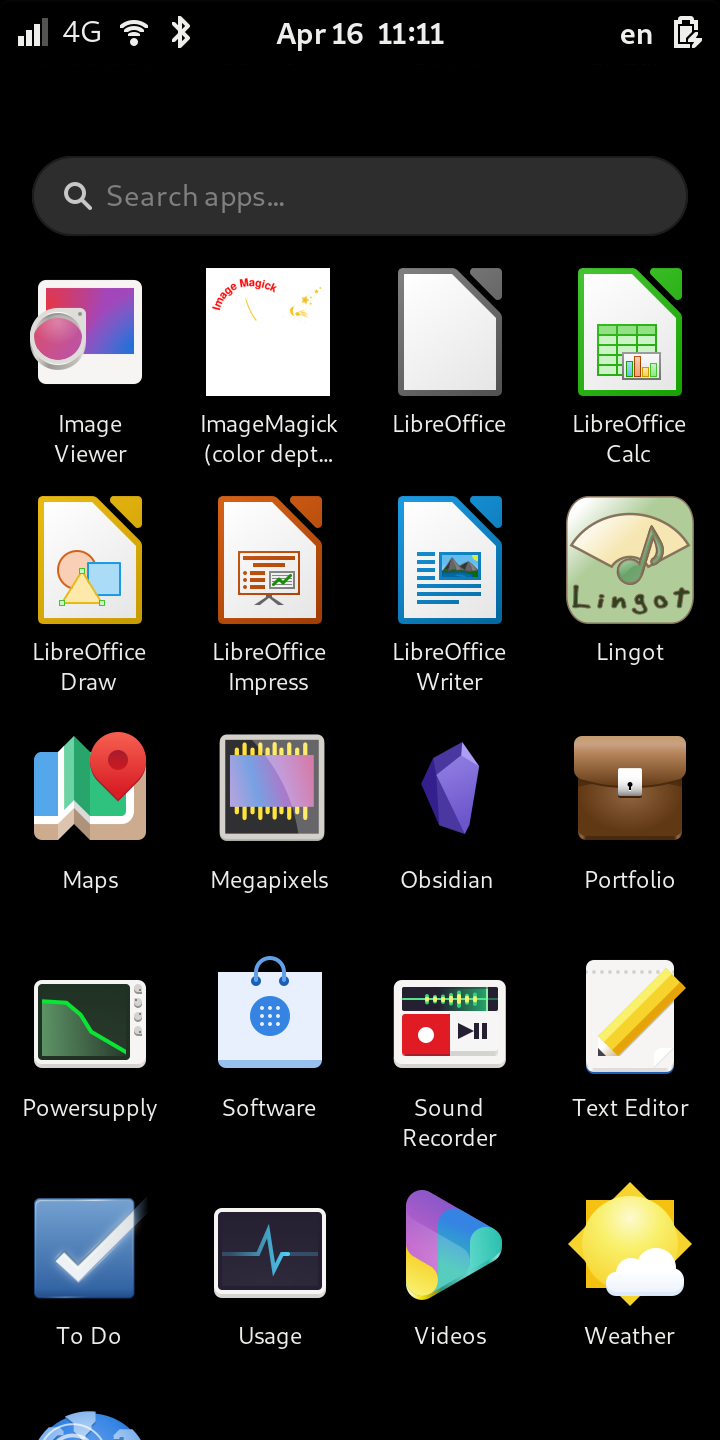
- Launcher, showing all applications
- Developer: Mobian community, Debian community
- OS family: Linux
- Source model: Open-source
- Repository: https://salsa.debian.org/Mobian-team?pow_referer=https%3A%2F%2Fmobian-project.org%2F
- Marketing target: Smartphones, tablets, mobile devices
- Available in: Multilingual
- Update method: Graphical update manager, image-based updates, apt-get
- Package manager: apt
- Supported platforms: ARM, x86 64
- Kernel type: Linux kernel
- Userland: GNU
- Default user interface: Graphical (native and web applications)
- Official website: mobian.org, wiki.mobian.org

Mobian is a project to port the Debian Linux distribution running the mainline Linux kernel to smartphones and tablets. The project was announced in 2020. It is available for the PinePhone, PinePhone Pro, PineTab, PineTab 2, Librem 5, OnePlus 6/6T, and Pocophone F1.

Droidian (previously known as hybris-mobian) is a version of Mobian that runs on top of Android's variant of the Linux kernel and the Libhybris and Halium adaptation layer and works with devices that are supported by Ubuntu Touch. It can be installed using the UBports installer.

== Organization ==
Mobian is maintained by two teams, Mobian and DebianOnMobile. DebianOnMobile maintains upstream parts.

== Software stack ==
As software stack Mobian uses the Phosh (Phone shell) graphical system developed by Purism, which is based on GTK. It aims to integrate Phosh with Debian, to the extent that the need for Mobian's customizations will be minimized. While all Debian apps can be installed on a mobile running Mobian, some will not work usably on the small-form-factor screen. There is a set of apps that have been adapted to work on a small touch screen, and which provide basic functionality. Many are GNOME-based. The project maintains a list of apps that work well on its wiki.

Initially, Mobian was based on Debian stable; however, in August 2021 it switched to being based on the Debian testing distribution.

In 2023, the first Mobian stable version was released, based on Debian stable again.

In October 2025, Mobian released the new stable version, Mobian Trixie. This release offers images based on Phosh 46.0 and Plasma Mobile 6.3, running a 6.12 kernel for almost all supported devices.

== Supported hardware ==
Initially Mobian was developed for the Librem 5 and the Pinephone which were designed to support Linux. In May 2020, Pine64 announced availability of Mobian for PinePhone. On 18 January 2021, the Mobian "Community Edition" PinePhone was released, an edition selling with Mobian pre-installed, and donating $10 US of the phone purchase cost to the Mobian developers. Later Mobian announced support for the PineTab, a tablet, and the Pinephone Pro. Mobian also supports the OnePlus 6/6T and Pocophone F1 Android phones with the mainline Linux kernel.

Juno computer released a x86-based tablet with Mobian preinstalled to preorder in October 2022.

As of October 2025, Mobian Trixie provides stable images for the following phones and tablets:

- PINE64 PinePhone, PinePhone Pro and PineTab
- Purism Librem 5
- Google Pixel 3a and 3a XL
- OnePlus 6 and OnePlus 6T
- Xiaomi Pocophone F1

== Reception ==
In June 2020, writing for Fossbytes, Sarvottam Kumar wrote about how Mobian aims to bring Debian 11 Bullseye to mobile ARM64 devices by creating custom images for installation. LinuxNews said it had a broad variety of apps, but the battery life on a Pinephone, at 4–6 hours, was still too low.

As of June 2020, Mobian is waitlisted for DistroWatch coverage.

In July 2020, Jean-Luc Aufranc in CNX Software article called it "a work in progress" he said it was "interesting" that it uses Purism's Phosh interface, and while it includes many apps, several functions were broken or unreliable. Marius Nestor of 9to5Linux wrote about availability of Mobian as an alternative to postmarketOS on PinePhone. He said there were many apps available, but also many were not optimized for mobile devices.

In October 2020, LinuxNews described Mobian as better than Ubuntu Touch but not as up-to-date as Arch Linux on the Pinetab.

In January 2021, Pine64 announced sales of PinePhones with "Mobian Community Edition" installed. Niklas Dierking wrote in heise.de about Pine64's announcement of availability of PinePhones with Mobian in two different hardware configurations, based on Pine64's announcement.

In January 2021 Matteo Gatti of Linux Freedom wrote a detailed review of Pinephone with Mobian OS.

In August 2021, Jean-Luc Aufranc of CNX Software recommended Mobian as "most stable OS" for using PinePhone as a mobile hotspot, in a detailed review of software and hardware.

In September 2021, in a detailed review of PinePhone for Hackaday, Bryan Cockfield wrote about experimenting with, and switching to Mobian, or "mobile Debian". He called the ability to SSH into it like any other computer and install software with apt "excellent features" which "worked surprisingly well" for the Kodi media player.

As of March 2023, Droidian, a mobile operating system based on Mobian, is waitlisted for DistroWatch coverage.

== See also ==
- List of open-source mobile phones
- Linux for mobile devices
- Comparison of mobile operating systems
- Mobile operating system
- Linux for mobile devices
