= PinePhone =

Smartphone with Linux-based mobile operating system

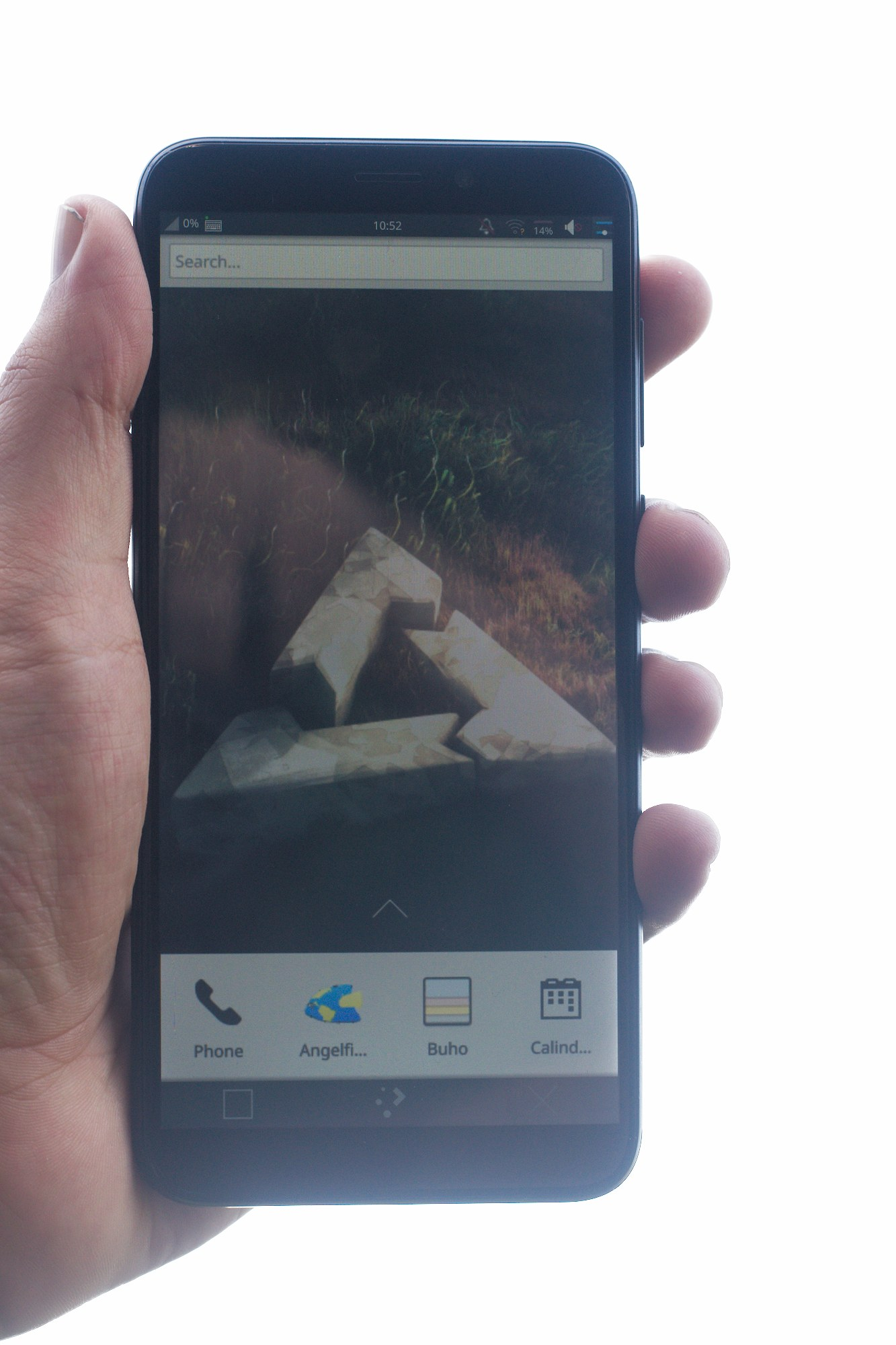
- A PinePhone with the Plasma Mobile interface
- Brand: Pine64
- First released: January 2020; 6 years ago
- Successor: PinePhone Pro
- Dimensions: 160.5×76.6×9.2 mm (6.32×3.02×0.36 in)
- Weight: 185 g (7 oz)
- Operating system: Linux
- CPU: Allwinner A64 ARM Quad core Cortex-A53, 64bit @ max1.2GHz
- GPU: Mali-400 MP2
- Modem: Quectel EG25-G, integrated
- Memory: 2 or 3 GB LPDDR3
- Storage: 16 or 32 GB eMMC flash memory
- Removable storage: bootable microSD
- Battery: 3000mAh, Samsung J7 form-factor, user-replaceable (est. cost $10 US)
- Rear camera: Single OV5640, 5MP, 1/4″, LED Flash
- Front camera: Single GC2145, 2MP, f/2.8, 1/5″
- Display: 720×1440 5.95″ IPS LCD
- Connectivity: Wi-Fi 802.11 b/g/n, single-band, hotspot capable, Bluetooth 4, A2DP, 3.5mm headphone jack, USB-C USB 2.0 PD/DisplayPort
- Data inputs: Sensors: Accelerometer; Gyroscope; Ambient light sensor; Proximity sensor; Compass; GPS, A-GPS; Other: Power; up/down buttons; LTE/GNSS, WiFi, Microphone, Speaker, Cameras kill switches

The PinePhone is a smartphone developed by Hong Kong–based computer manufacturer Pine64, designed to provide users with full control over the device. This is achieved through the use of mainline Linux-based mobile operating systems, assembly of the phone using screws, and facilitating simplified disassembly for repairs and upgrades. The 2G-4GLTE modem, GPS, Wi-Fi, Bluetooth and both cameras can be physically switched off. The PinePhone currently ships with the Manjaro Linux operating system using the Plasma Mobile graphic interface, although previously other distributions were shipped, which can still be installed by users.

== History ==
Pine64 sold limited editions of the PinePhone, marketed towards developers and early adopters. The phone shipped worldwide with few geographical restrictions. The "Braveheart" edition, shipped in January 2020, was the first publicly available version of the phone, providing only a test firmware, so the user could test their phone before installing their operating system of choice.

In 2019, Pine64 partnered with existing and well established Linux-on-phone projects to launch a "Community Edition" campaign to incentivize software development for the device. Through this partnership, Pine64 donated $10 for each unit sold to the project maintainers. The community edition PinePhones featured a branding on the back cover and shipped with a custom box designed by the partnered artists. The "Mobian" community edition in February 2021 was the last to be offered.

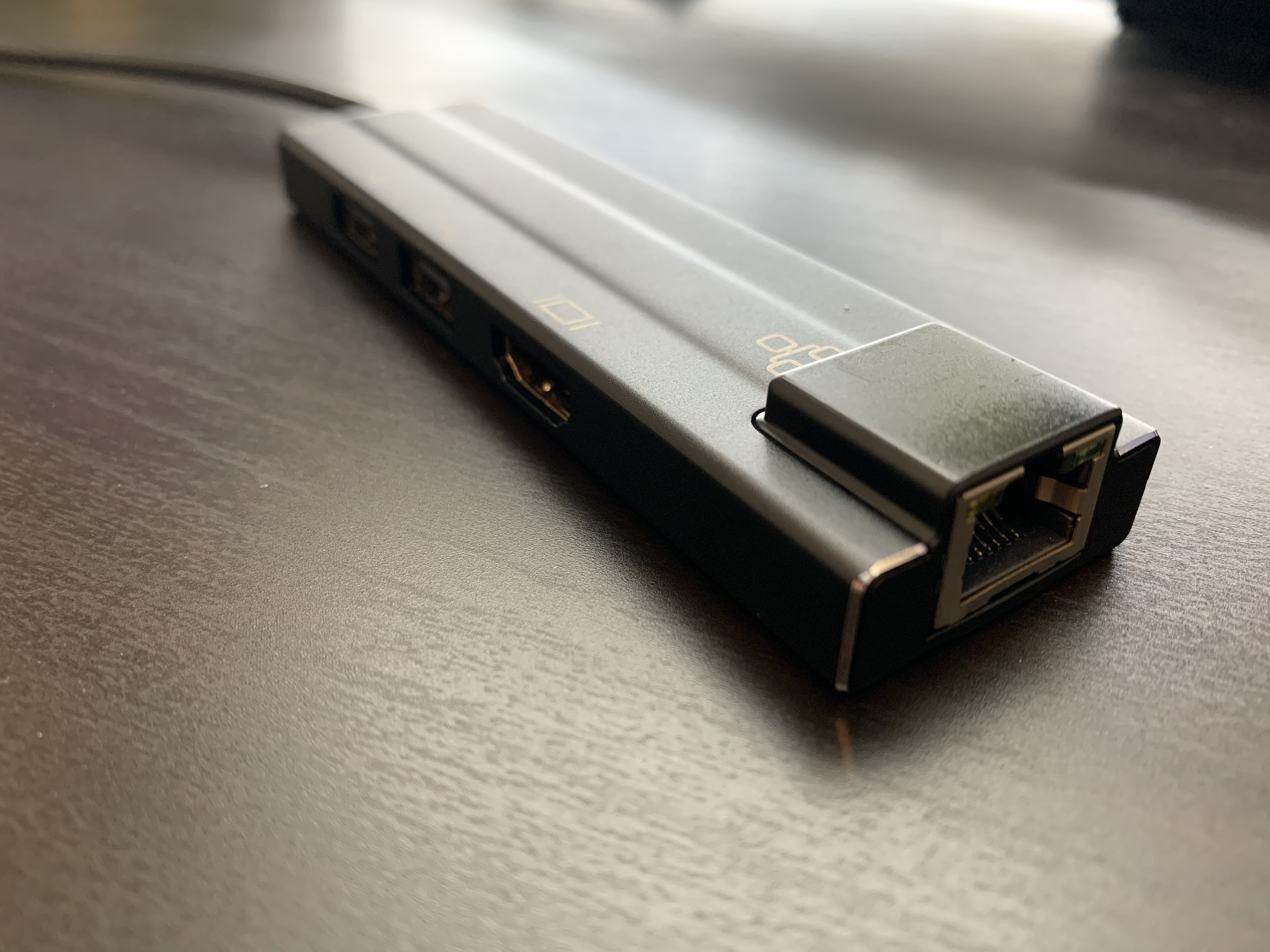
PinePhone docking bar

Initially, the PinePhone was only available in one hardware configuration. The enhanced "Convergence Package" was introduced with the postmarketOS community edition announcement, featuring increased RAM, additional eMMC storage, and a USB-C dock known as a "docking bar". The docking bar is capable of delivering power to the phone via USB-C power-in (3 A 5 V), outputting digital video via HDMI, and has 10/100 Mbit/s Ethernet connectivity and two USB 2.0 ports (for example, external storage, mouse and keyboard).

In February 2021, Pine64 announced the end of community edition devices, and that the default operating system for the production-ready PinePhone would be Manjaro using the KDE Plasma Mobile graphical environment. The company then introduced the PinePhone Beta Edition several weeks later. The Beta Edition's hardware and pricing was confirmed to be the same as the previous three community edition production runs, and the "Beta" was a reference to the software only. Pine64 began pre-orders on March 24, 2021, and began shipping Beta Edition devices in late April.

In October 2021, Pine64 announced the PinePhone Pro. In January 2022, Pine64 started accepting pre-orders of PinePhone Pro for deliveries by February 2022.

== Features and comparisons ==
The PinePhone is often compared to other phones shipping with non-Android Linux distributions, especially the Librem 5, which released around the same time, and the WiFi-VoIP phone Necuno, which does not employ a cellular modem.

The Pine64 promised five years of production and shared a common A64 platform with the PinkeTab tablet and Pine A64 boards. It was built to encourage tinkerers to create mods and DIY projects based on the PinePhone.

=== Hardware ===
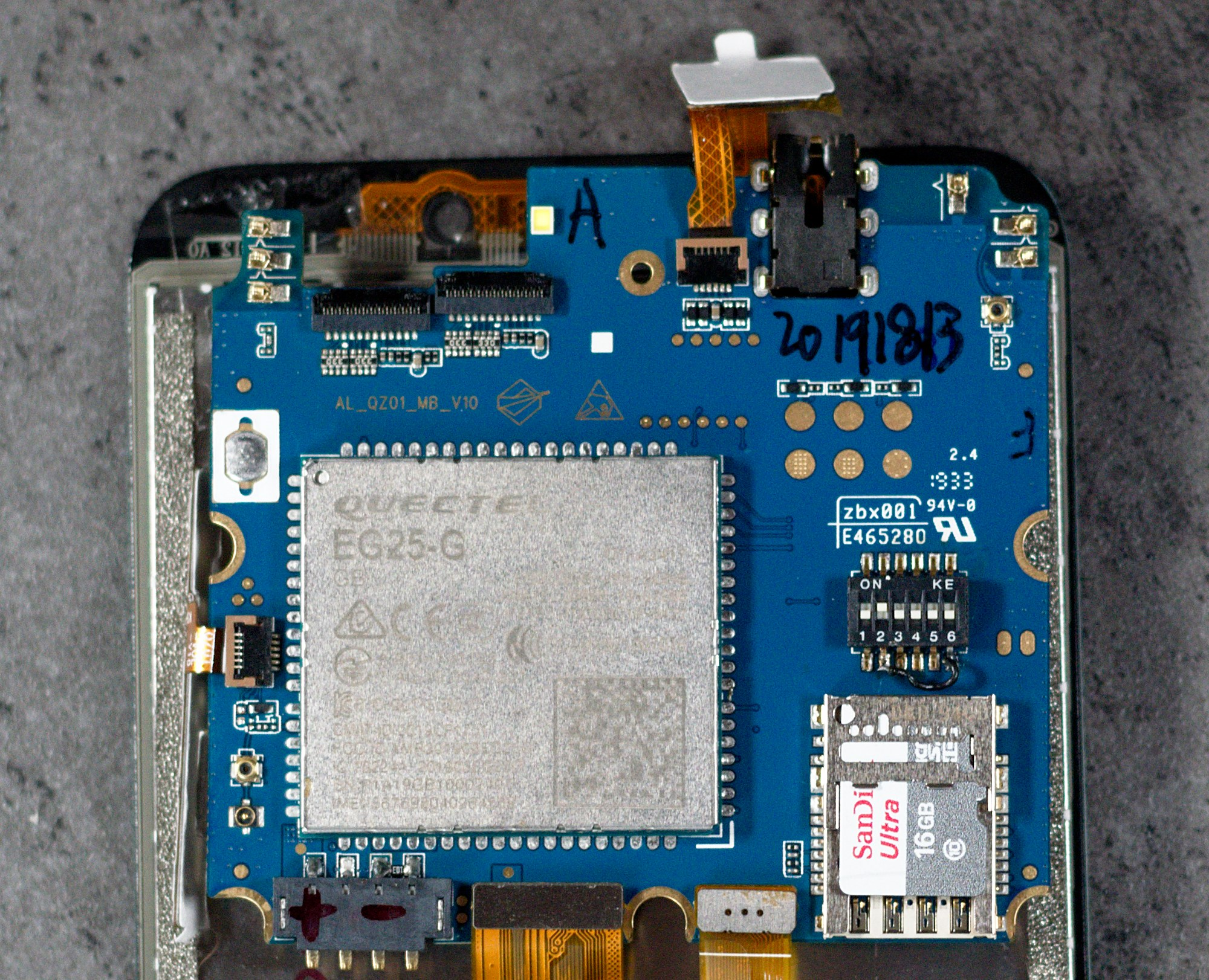
Main board; DIP cut-off switches center right, black-and-white

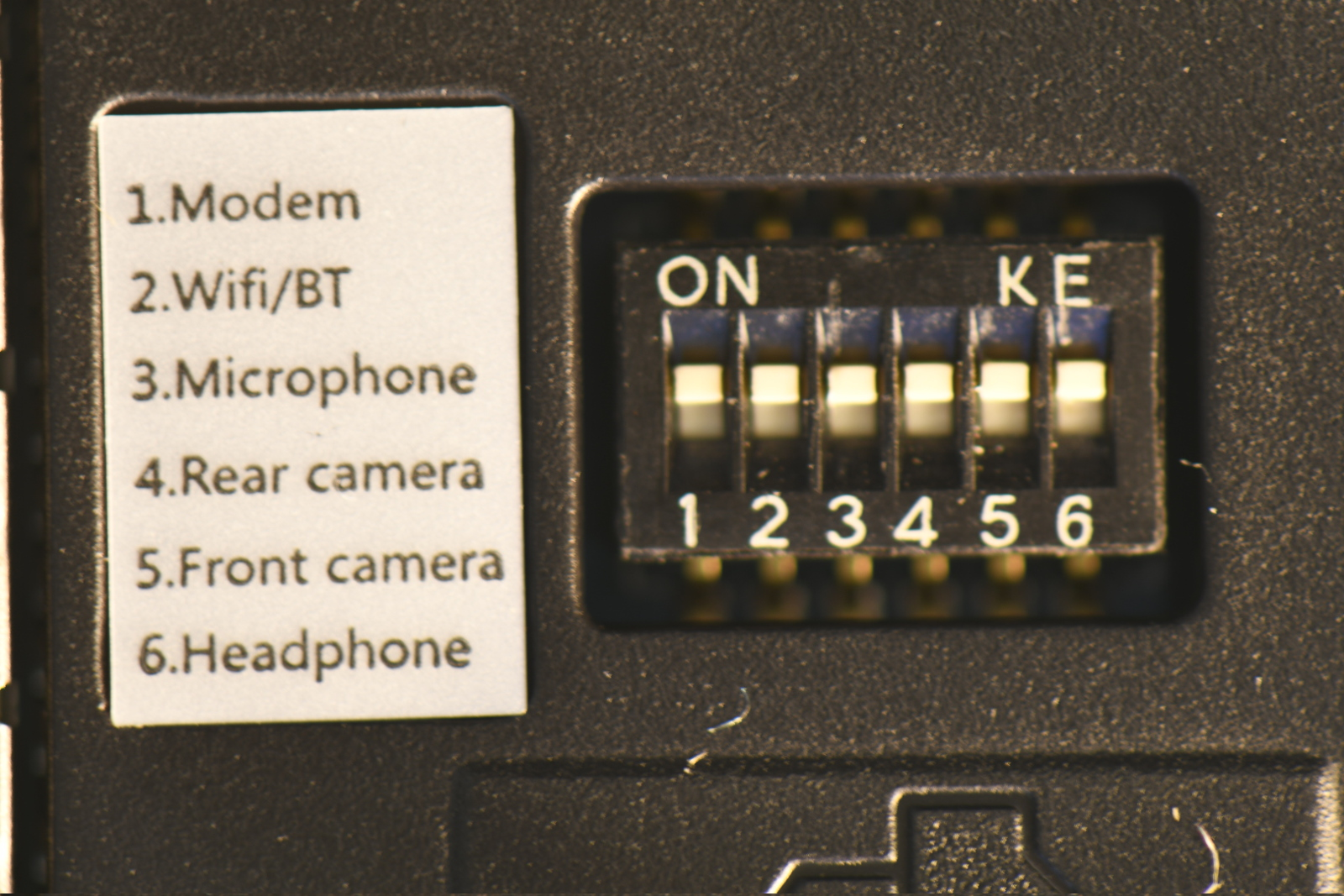
DIP switches on the PinePhone

The original PinePhone used an Allwinner A64 processor, which has four Cortex-A53 cores clocked at 1.152 GHz and a Mali-400 MP2 GPU. Its frame and case cover are made of plastic. It has a 5-megapixel back camera and a 2-megapixel front camera, and a USB-C port with USB 2.0 that supports DisplayPort alt-mode. The 3000 mAh battery supports 15 W fast charging and is easily replaced without tools. It uses the same form factor as a Galaxy J7 battery to make it easier to find replacement batteries. Linux distributions configure its LPDDR3 DRAM at clock rates that vary between 552 and 624 MHz.

Like the Librem 5, the PinePhone uses separate cellular baseband and Wi-Fi/Bluetooth chips. Together with the hardware kill switches, this results in larger printed circuit boards (PCBs) and less energy efficiency compared to the mass-produced Android phone that has an integrated System on a Chip, such as the Snapdragon, Helio or Exynos. The PinePhone is thinner at 9.2 mm than the Librem 5 which is 15.5 mm thick because the PinePhone solders its wireless communication chips to the PCB whereas the Librem 5 places the cellular baseband and Wi-Fi/Bluetooth on two removable M.2 cards.

Pine64 is the second phone maker (after OpenMoko) to offer booting from a microSD card, which allows users to try out one or more operating systems before installing in the internal flash memory.

Another distinctive feature of the PinePhone is the I2C connector under the back cover, which can be used for adding mods to the phone. In 2019 and 2020, Pine64 stated that it was developing four mods: a Psion Series 5-inspired physical keyboard, a 5000 mAh battery, wireless charging and a fingerprint sensor.

The PinePhone has six DIP switches under the back cover, the first five of which switch off separately the cellular modem, the Wi-Fi/Bluetooth module, the microphone, the rear camera, and the front camera. The sixth DIP switch will convert the 3.5 mm headphone jack into a UART serial port, which is the first time this kind of switch has been included in a mobile phone.

Circuit schematics of the PinePhone are available.

=== Software ===
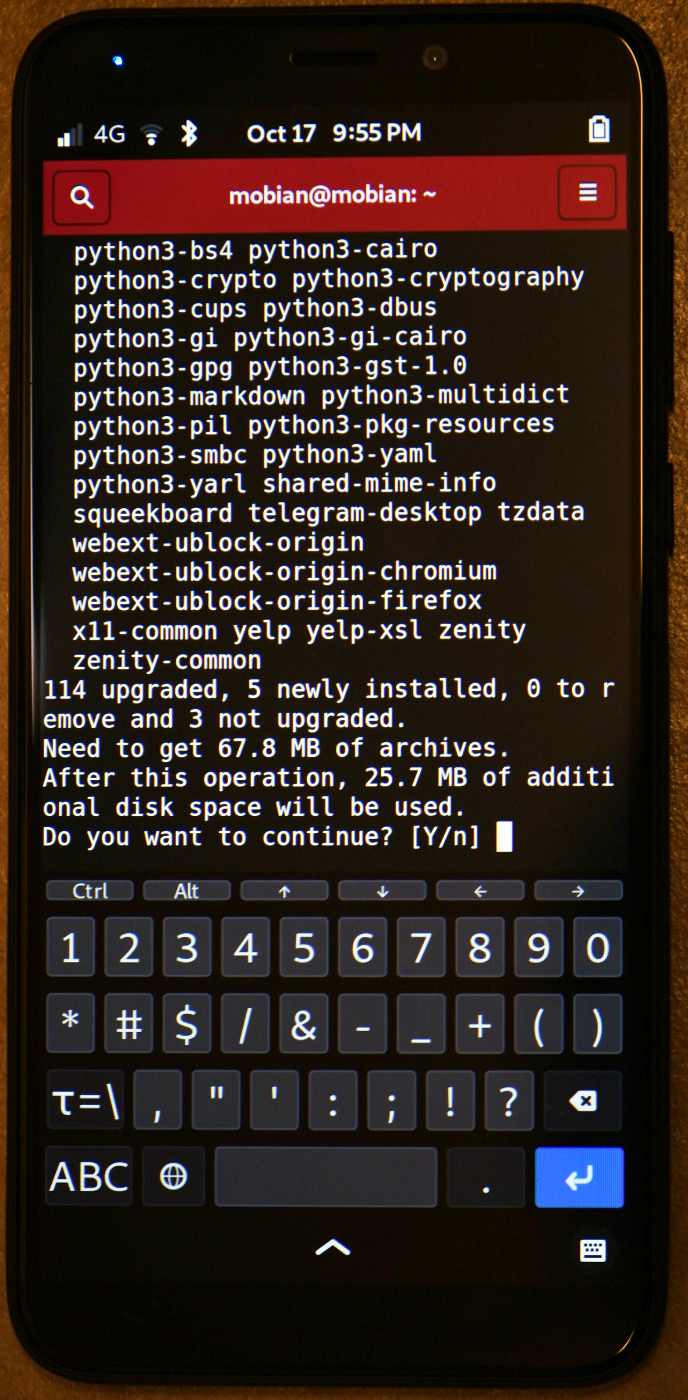
Use of APT performing an update, running on the Linux distribution Mobian, with the upper bar colored red to warn that root privileges are being used

The PinePhone aims to be fully open source in its drivers and bootloader. Despite this, due to the scarcity of open-source components for cellular and wireless connectivity, the firmware for the Realtek RTL8723CS Wi-Fi/Bluetooth, as well as the optional autofocus firmware for the OmniVision OV5640 back camera, remain proprietary software. In order to mitigate potential threats to privacy, these components communicate with the rest of the system only over serial protocols, such as USB 2.0, I2S and SDIO, which do not allow direct memory access (DMA). Use of these protocols also permits them to be physically disconnected via kill switches.

In late 2020, Pine64 started an incentive called the Nutcracker Challenge, in order to encourage the development of open-source wireless networking on the BL602 Wi-Fi and Bluetooth board. Some distributions support the use of USB Wi-Fi adapters that use open-source wireless firmware. Modem firmware of the Quectel EG25-G LTE board is based on a proprietary Android userspace, though an unofficial, mostly open-source version exists, replacing most proprietary components, except for the baseband firmware and the TrustZone kernel, which is signed by Qualcomm.

==== Operating systems ====
The PinePhone relies completely on open-source operating systems developed by external communities, with only the flashing onto the phone done by Pine64 directly. Because these community OS projects were involved in the development of the PinePhone, it has been ported to 19 Linux distributions and seven graphical user interfaces, as of August 2021, such as Ubuntu Touch by UBports, postmarketOS, Mobian (Debian ARM), LuneOS, Nemo Mobile and Maemo Leste.

As well as orthodox GNU/Linux, an unofficial porting project, GloDroid, has ported Android 11 to the PinePhone. Genode targeted the device for their Mobile Sculpt operating system whose features include microkernel, capability-based security and a unique graphical configuration system.

== Difference between PinePhone Community Edition and PinePhone Pro, and controversy ==
Until 2021, the PinePhone had ports from several Linux Mobile distributions. These ports allowed for an easy installation process (flashing the distribution onto a bootable microSD card) which was convenient to both users and creators of the distributions. Official Community Editions were released with special branding for five projects: postmarketOS, UBPorts, KDE Plasma Mobile, Manjaro and Mobian. A portion of revenue from each of these branded editions would be passed on by Pine64 to the respective project.

In 2021, the PinePhone Pro appeared. This model came with controversial changes that caused one of the main PinePhone engineers to leave the project:

- The PinePhone Community Edition programme was discontinued in favour of the PinePhone Pro.
- Instead of the several Linux distributions supported earlier, focus was given only to Manjaro, whose contributions to the mobile Linux ecosystem were allegedly minimal, and largely limited to packaging rather than creating or improving new software.
- The installation process changed from simple microSD flash card into a specific U-Boot-based process. This required other distros to adapt to the new model, redesigned with only Manjaro Mobile in mind, in order to be able to run on the PinePhone
- PinePhone staff began discussing changes and making decisions with only Manjaro in mind, rather than taking other Linux distributions into account.

The above choices have later been justified by Pine64, responding to the former engineer's blog post as well as criticism of the PinePhone Pro by various Open Source communities. It was officially discontinued in August 2025, as it didn't sell well enough to keep production going.

== Editions ==
Limited editions
Model	Pre-installed OS	Pre-installed graphical interface	Pre-order date	Shipping date	Hardware revision	Processor	RAM (GB)	eMMC storage (GB)	Price
Pinephone - developer hardware revision					v1.0	Allwinner A64 ARM Quad core Cortex-A53, 64bit @ max1.2 GHz	2	16	
Pinephone - Braveheart Edition	Factory Test image based on postmarketOS	custom UI	November 15, 2019	January 17, 2020	v1.1	Allwinner A64 ARM Quad core Cortex-A53, 64bit @ max1.2 GHz	2	16	$149
Pinephone - UBports Community Edition	Ubuntu Touch	Lomiri	April 2, 2020	May 2020	v1.2	Allwinner A64 ARM Quad core Cortex-A53, 64bit @ max1.2 GHz	2	16	$149
Pinephone - postmarketOS Community Edition	postmarketOS	Phosh	July 15, 2020	August 25, 2020	v1.2a	Allwinner A64 ARM Quad core Cortex-A53, 64bit @ max1.2 GHz	2/3	16/32	$149 / $199 (latter includes USB-C dock)
Pinephone - Manjaro Community Edition	Manjaro	Phosh	September 17, 2020	October 30, 2020	v1.2b	Allwinner A64 ARM Quad core Cortex-A53, 64bit @ max1.2 GHz	2/3	16/32	$149 / $199 (latter includes USB-C dock)
Pinephone - KDE Community Edition	Manjaro (customized version)	Plasma Mobile	December 1, 2020	January 2021	v1.2b	Allwinner A64 ARM Quad core Cortex-A53, 64bit @ max1.2 GHz	2/3	16/32	$149 / $199 (latter includes USB-C dock)
Pinephone - Mobian Community Edition	Mobian	Phosh	January 17, 2021	February 2021	v1.2b	Allwinner A64 ARM Quad core Cortex-A53, 64bit @ max1.2 GHz	2/3	16/32	$149 / $199 (latter includes USB-C dock)
Pinephone - Beta Edition	Manjaro	Plasma Mobile	March 24, 2021	April 2021	v1.2b	Allwinner A64 ARM Quad core Cortex-A53, 64bit @ max1.2 GHz	2/3	16/32	$149 / $199 (latter includes USB-C dock)
Pinephone Pro - Explorer Edition	Manjaro	Plasma Mobile	2022	2022		Rockchip RK3399S SoC with 2× 1.5 GHz A72 cores and 4× 1.5 GHz A53 cores	4	128	$399

== List of Operating systems that can run on PinePhone ==
- Nura
- Mobian
- Nemo Mobile
- Manjaro Mobile
- Genode Sculpt

== Reception ==
In August 2020, AndroidPolice reviewed the first Community edition, and beside the title "The Linux-based PinePhone is the most interesting smartphone I've tried in years" it touted the number of available distros, and the idea behind communities being provided with the means of developing their OS.

In January 2020, ZDNet called the PinePhone hardware "promising" and noted the hardware switches.

In December 2019, Martins D. Okoi of FossMint said that the first edition of the PinePhone is aimed at Linux-savvy users who would like to test beta operating system builds, but the version for general users should be available in March 2020.

In November 2019, Phillip Prado of Android Authority said that the PinePhone had the potential to "expand our imaginations into what mobile computing could look like", but he was not expecting it to replace everyone's Android device. Ars Technica wrote about the unusual external ports of the phone, offering I2C, GPIO and serial.

== See also ==
- List of open-source mobile phones
- Comparison of open-source mobile phones
- PinePhone Pro
- Librem 5
