= Comparison of open-source mobile phones =

The scope for this page is that used for list of open-source mobile phones.

== Mobiles currently in production ==
Model	Hardware kill switches	Modular smartphone	System-on-a-chip (Soc)	Baseband cellular modem	Wi-Fi firmware	Boot firmware	Other proprietary firmware	Hardware licensing	Obsolescence slowdown	Modifiability	Security	Certifications	Other
Librem 5	3: Cameras and the microphone, Wi-Fi and Bluetooth, and baseband processor. All three also shut off sensors (GPS, compass, accelerometer etc.).	The Wi-Fi+Bluetooth card, and the Modem are on M.2 slots.	2017 NXP arm64	On replaceable m.2 card. Proprietary firmware isolated from CPU with a USB bus (like a USB Wi-Fi dongle)	Originally, proprietary firmware isolated over USB, no downloadable/modifiable firmware; subsequently, Purism paid Redpine Signals to create open-source Wi-Fi/Bluetooth firmware for the RedPine hardware.	proprietary DRAM init code loaded on separate CPU for RYF cert compliance	none in /lib/firmware; some non-modifiable proprietary firmware in components.	schematics released under GPL 3.0+	User-replaceable (but custom-sized) battery, lifetime updates Display and frame fused. Phillips-head screws. Wi-Fi and Bluetooth on replaceable m.2 cards (the former custom-made).	m.2 card slots. Purism has traditionally had more time-limited parts availability.	slot for an OpenPGP card, planned Librem key support	Tentatively recommended by Free Software Foundation (FSF). Operating system PureOS is endorsed by FSF. Seeking FSF "Respects Your Freedom" endorsement.	Convergence; will run as desktop. Headphone jack. Carrier-free OTT service available.
PinePhone	5: Modem & GNSS, Wi-Fi & Bluetooth, microphone, rear camera, front camera, audio jack (DIP switches inside back cover). No kill switch for other sensors.		2015 Allwinner arm64 (Allwinner violates the GPL)	Quectel EG25-G. Ships with proprietary firmware isolated from CPU with a USB bus. More secure, better-featured free replacement exists, but can't ship due to regulatory threats.	proprietary Wi-Fi/Bluetooth firmware, in /lib/firmware. Efforts to replace it are in beta, but may never be legal to ship, same as original PinePhone.	open-source boot software		proprietary schematics published	User-replaceable battery, 5-year production run. Phillips-head screws.	I2C pogo pins, back mods can be added. Cannot be upgraded beyond USB 2.0. Bootable from a microSD card. Good parts availability.	GPS and modem on same kill switch; neither can be used while the other is airgapped.		entire phone can be disassembled. Headphone jack. Convergence.

== Mobiles expected to be in production ==
Model	Expected release date	Hardware kill switches	Modular smartphone	System-on-a-chip (Soc)	Baseband cellular modem	Wi-Fi firmware	Boot firmware	Other proprietary firmware	Hardware licensing	Obsolescence slowdown	Modifiability	Security	Certifications	Other
DragonBox Pyra Mobile Edition	Unclear, possibly defunct	None	The PCB is separated in three parts: CPU board (CPU, RAM and storage), mainboard (ports, Wi-Fi and Bluetooth) and the display board.						schematics will be available to users					
Necunos NC 1	Unclear, possibly defunct	None		2011 NXP i.MX 6 Quad and 4x Cortex-A9 MP, 32-bit	None	Proprietary blob for wi-fi driver (for regulatory reasons) Blob without access to the main memory; via SDIO	probably binary blobs on separate ROM, given cert aspirations	binary-blob proprietary firmware will not have memory access				strong focus; most sensors omitted for security.	Seeking FSF endorsement.	100 Mbit/s ethernet port
Mudita Kompakt	Q2 2025	Yes		MediaTek MT6761V/WBA (Helio A22) 2GHz quad-core ARM Cortex-A53 processor with Imagination GE8300 graphics										
Liberux NEXX	July 2026	Cellular modem, camera, microphone	Separate storage, RAM and cellular mdem	Rockchip RK7588S	Qualcomm Snapdragon X62				Publish own schematics. Aim to minimise undocumented components.					

== Mobiles no longer in production ==
Model	Hardware kill switches	System-on-a-chip (Soc)	Baseband cellular modem	Wi-Fi firmware	Boot firmware	Other proprietary firmware	Hardware licensing	Obsolescence	Modifiability	Security	Certifications	Other
PinePhone Pro	5 (or 4, amalgamating cameras?): Modem & GNSS, Wi-Fi & Bluetooth, microphone, rear camera, front camera, audio jack (DIP switches inside back cover). No kill switch for other sensors.	Hexacore. 2016 Rockchip RK3399S and 2× A72 and 4× A53 CPU cores @ 1.5 GHz	Quectel EG25-G. Ships with proprietary firmware for regulatory compliance (isolated from CPU with a USB bus). More secure, better-featured free replacement exists.	proprietary Wi-Fi/Bluetooth firmware, in /lib/firmware. Efforts to replace it are in beta, but may never be legal to ship, same as original PinePhone.	open-source boot software, same as original PinePhone.		?	User-replaceable Samsung J7 form-factor 3000mAh battery. Phillips-head screws.	I2C pogo pins, back mods can be added (all compatible with original PinePhone). USB 3.0. Bootable from a microSD card. Good parts availability.	GPS and modem on same kill switch; neither can be used while the other is airgapped.		entire phone can be disassembled. Headphone jack. Convergence (will run as a desktop if monitor and keyboard plugged in).
Meizu PRO 5 Ubuntu Edition	None											
Meizu MX4 Ubuntu Edition	None											
BQ Aquaris E5 HD Ubuntu Edition	None	MediaTek Quad Core Cortex A7 1.3 GHz										
BQ Aquaris E4.5 Ubuntu Edition	None											
NEO1973												
Neo FreeRunner												

== See also ==
- Comparison of mobile operating systems
- List of open-source mobile phones
