= PinePhone Pro =

Smartphone with Linux-based mobile operating system

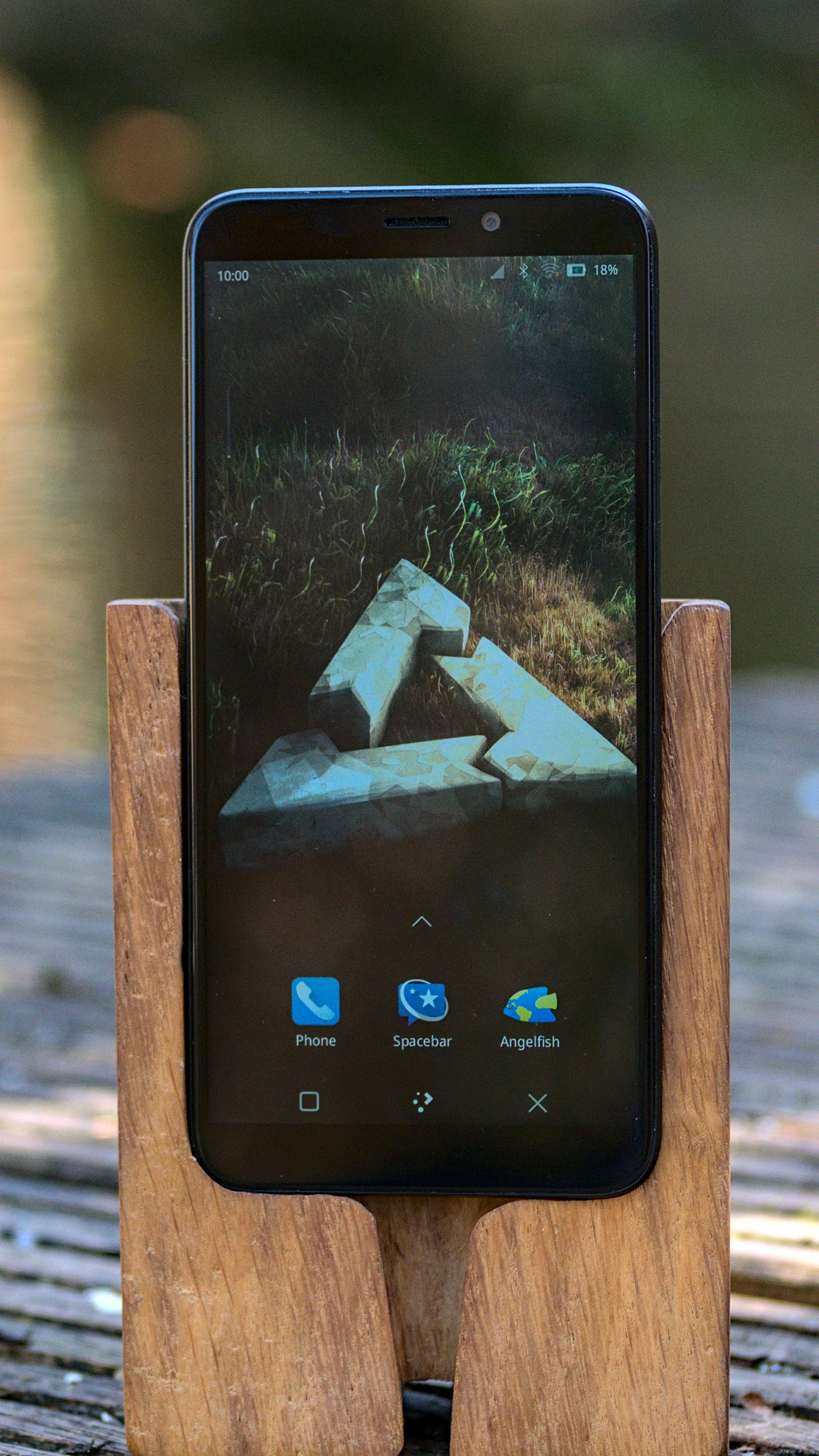
- A PinePhone Pro with the Plasma Mobile interface
- Brand: Pine64
- First released: February 2022; 4 years ago
- Predecessor: PinePhone
- Dimensions: 160.8×76.6×11.1 mm (6.33×3.02×0.44 in)
- Weight: 215 g (8 oz)
- Operating system: Linux
- CPU: Rockchip rk3399s 4x 1.5 GHz Cortex-A53 & 2x 2Ghz Cortex-A72
- GPU: Mali-T860 MP4
- Modem: Quectel EG25-G
- Memory: 4 GB LPDDR4
- Storage: 128 GB eMMC flash memory
- Removable storage: bootable microSD
- Battery: 3000mAh, Samsung J7 form-factor, user-replaceable
- Rear camera: Single 13MP Sony IMX258, LED Flash
- Front camera: 8MP OmniVision OV8858
- Display: 6″ 720x1440 IPS LCD
- Connectivity: Wi-Fi AMPAK AP6255 WiFi 11ac, single-band, hotspot capable, Bluetooth 4.1, A2DP, 3.5mm headphone jack, USB-C USB 3.0 PD/DisplayPort
- Data inputs: Sensors: Accelerometer; Gyroscope; Ambient light sensor; Proximity sensor; Compass; GPS, A-GPS, GLONASS; Other: Power; up/down buttons; LTE/GNSS, WiFi, Microphone, Speaker, Cameras kill switches

The PinePhone Pro is a smartphone developed by Hong Kong–based computer manufacturer Pine64. The phone is the successor to the PinePhone released in 2020. The default operating system is Sailfish OS (previously Manjaro ARM, with Plasma Mobile as the user interface). The device is a developer platform with open hardware specifications but with unfinished software. The target group of the device is free and open-source software developers who will develop the software. The device was first shipped to developers in December 2021, and in February 2022 devices were made available to consumers. In August of 2025, the PinePhone Pro was discontinued due to poor sales, which made continuing production unsustainable.

== Hardware ==
The device is built on the Rockchip RK3399S system on a chip, which is a custom version of the stock RK3399, uniquely designed for the device. The processing power roughly compares to mid-range phones from 2016. The device has 4 GB of LPDDR4 ram, a 6-inch display, 13 MP Sony IMX258 as the main camera, 8 MP Omnivision OV8858 as front camera and has a user-replaceable 3000 mAh Samsung J7-series battery.

The phone has hardware kill switches for shutting down network connections, microphone, speaker, and cameras. The device has pogo pins for attachable backs compatible with the original PinePhone.

== Software ==
The device ships with Sailfish OS (previously Manjaro ARM, with Plasma Mobile as the user interface), though users are free to switch to other operating systems. Unlike the original PinePhone where the software is considered in beta version, the software shipped on the PinePhone Pro is considered pre-beta both for Sailfish OS and Manjaro versions.

U-Boot is used as the default boot loader and it supports booting from an SD card. The bootloader can be replaced, as there are alternatives, such as Tow-boot. The main image sensor driver has been added to the mainline kernel by Sony. Modem firmware of the Quectel EG25-G is based on a proprietary Android userspace, though an unofficial open-source version exists (actually mostly open-source: the custom firmware replaces most proprietary components, except for baseband firmware and the TrustZone kernel, which is signed by Qualcomm).

In the middle of 2022, the software stack was under development, resulting in the hardware not supporting the software. The first images from the camera were taken in May 2022. Most widely-supported hardware is in a heavily patched downstream kernel called Megi kernel. There is alternative operating systems focusing on mainline Linux kernel support, such as Nura.

== See also ==
- List of open-source mobile phones
- Comparison of open-source mobile phones
