= Linux for mobile devices =

Linux for mobile devices, sometimes referred to as mobile Linux, is the usage of Linux-based operating systems on portable devices, whose primary or only human interface device (HID) is a touchscreen. It mainly comprises smartphones and tablet computers, but also some mobile phones, personal digital assistants (PDAs) portable media players that come with a touchscreen separately.

Mobile Linux is a relatively recent addition to the Linux range of use, with Google's Android operating system pioneering the concept. While UBPorts tried to follow suit with Ubuntu Touch, a wider development of free Linux operating systems specifically for mobile devices was only really spurred in the latter 2010s, when various smaller companies started projects to develop open source phones.

== Lists ==
=== Operating systems ===
This is a list of Linux distributions directly targeted towards use with mobile phones, being offered preconfigured with the mobile-oriented software listed below. There are both phone producers who develop their own operating systems and independent developments by community projects. Outside of these, several traditional distributions have versions compiled for the ARM architecture family, which could be configured to use these components. This is done, for example, with Manjaro by the PinePhone.

==== Active ====
- Android
  - /e/
  - Android Go
  - EMUI (Non GMS compliant)
  - Fire OS
  - GrapheneOS
  - iodéOS
  - Lineage OS
  - One UI
  - Wear OS
  - Other custom Android distributions

Maemo timeline

Relationships between mer and Tizen

- FOSS Linux distributions using Wayland
  - BengalOS
  - Fedora Mobility
  - Manjaro ARM
  - Mobian (based on Debian)
  - Mobile NixOS (based on NixOS)
  - Nura (formerly postmarketOS, based on Alpine Linux)
  - PureOS
  - SteamOS (Powering Steam Deck)
  - Ubuntu Touch (discontinued by Canonical, adopted by UBports Community)
- AsteroidOS (for wearables)
- ChromeOS (for 2-in-1 PC and Chrome Tablet)
- EMUI/HarmonyOS (EMUI 12 onwards)
- KaiOS
- Kindle firmware
- LuneOS (based on HP webOS)
- Sailfish OS (based on Nemo Mobile)
- Tizen
- webOS

==== Discontinued ====
- Bada
- Firefox OS
- iPodLinux
- MeeGo
- Moblin
- Openmoko Linux
- OpenZaurus
- SHR

=== Smartphones ===
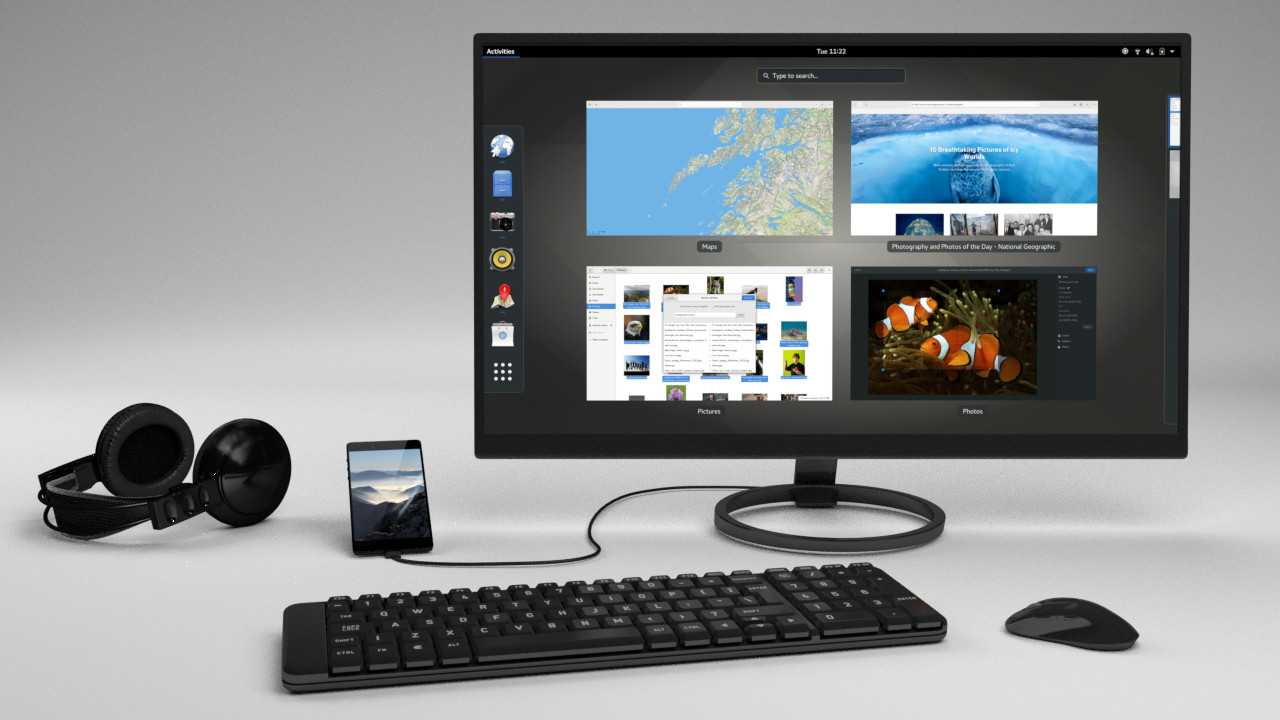
Cell phone convergence with the Librem 5

Phones with Linux preinstalled:

- Librem 5
- PinePhone
- Necuno (discontinued)

=== Middlewares ===
- BusyBox – small footprint alternative to GNU Core Utilities, under GNU GPLv2
- Fcitx
- Halium
- Intelligent Input Bus
- Maliit
- mer
- Smart Common Input Method
- Toybox – BSD licensed alternative to BusyBox
- Uim

=== UI ===
- GPE Palmtop Environment
- Phosh
- Plasma Mobile
- Lomiri (previously known as Unity8)

== See also ==
- Anbox – allows Android apps to run on Linux distributions
