= List of open-source mobile phones =

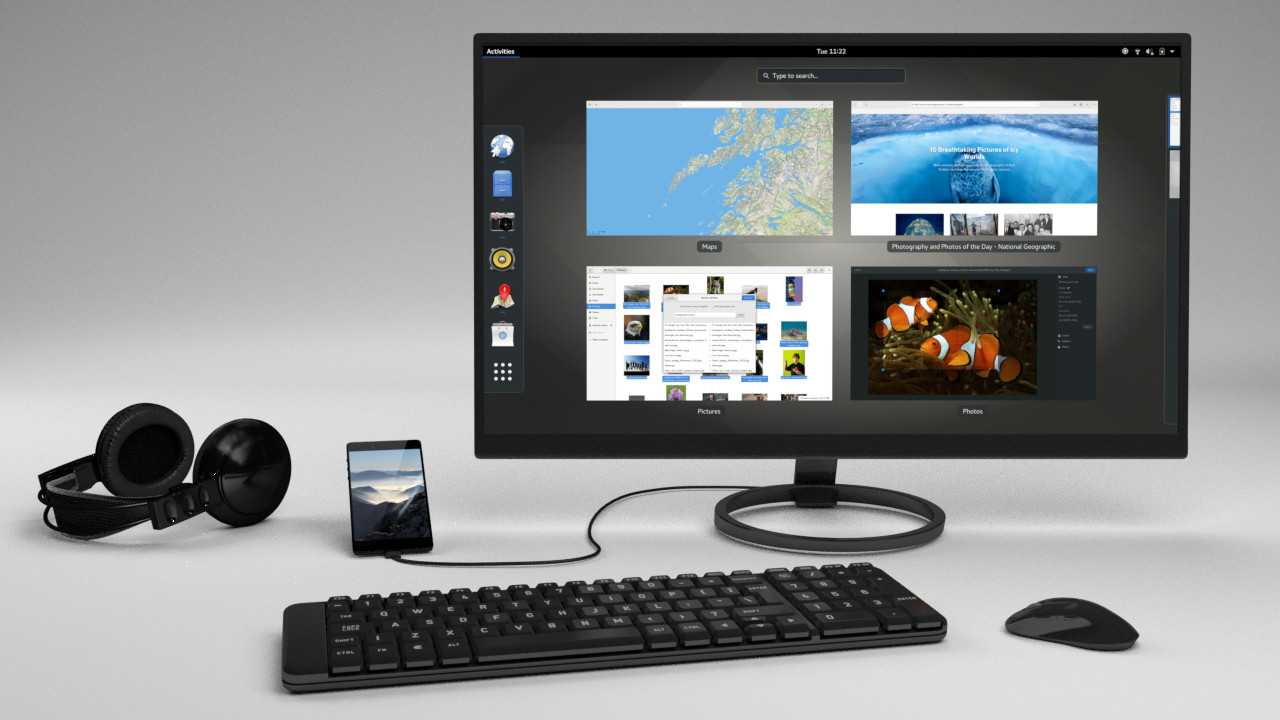
Mobile/desktop convergence: the Librem 5 open-source mobile, when connected to a keyboard, screen, and mouse, runs as a desktop computer.

This is a list of mobile phones with open-source operating systems.

== Scope of the list ==
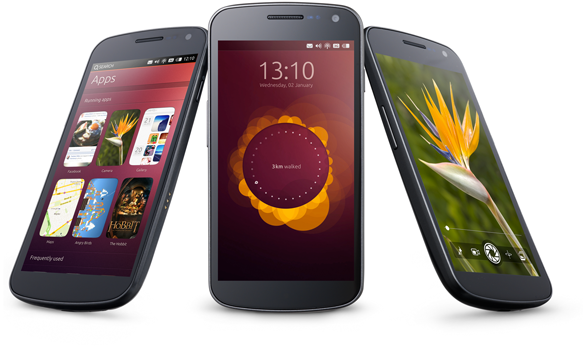
Phones sold with Ubuntu Touch

=== Cellular modem and other firmware ===
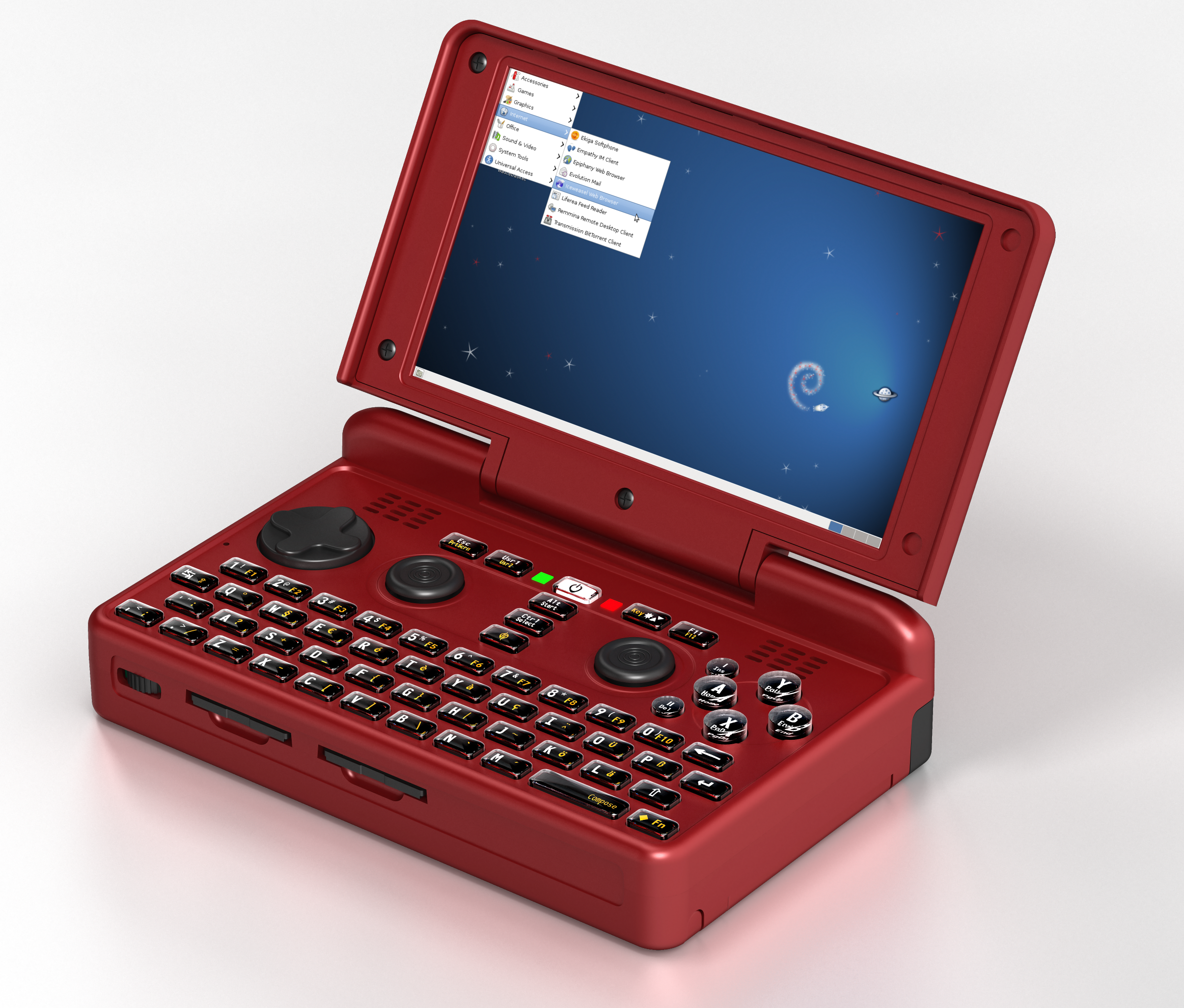

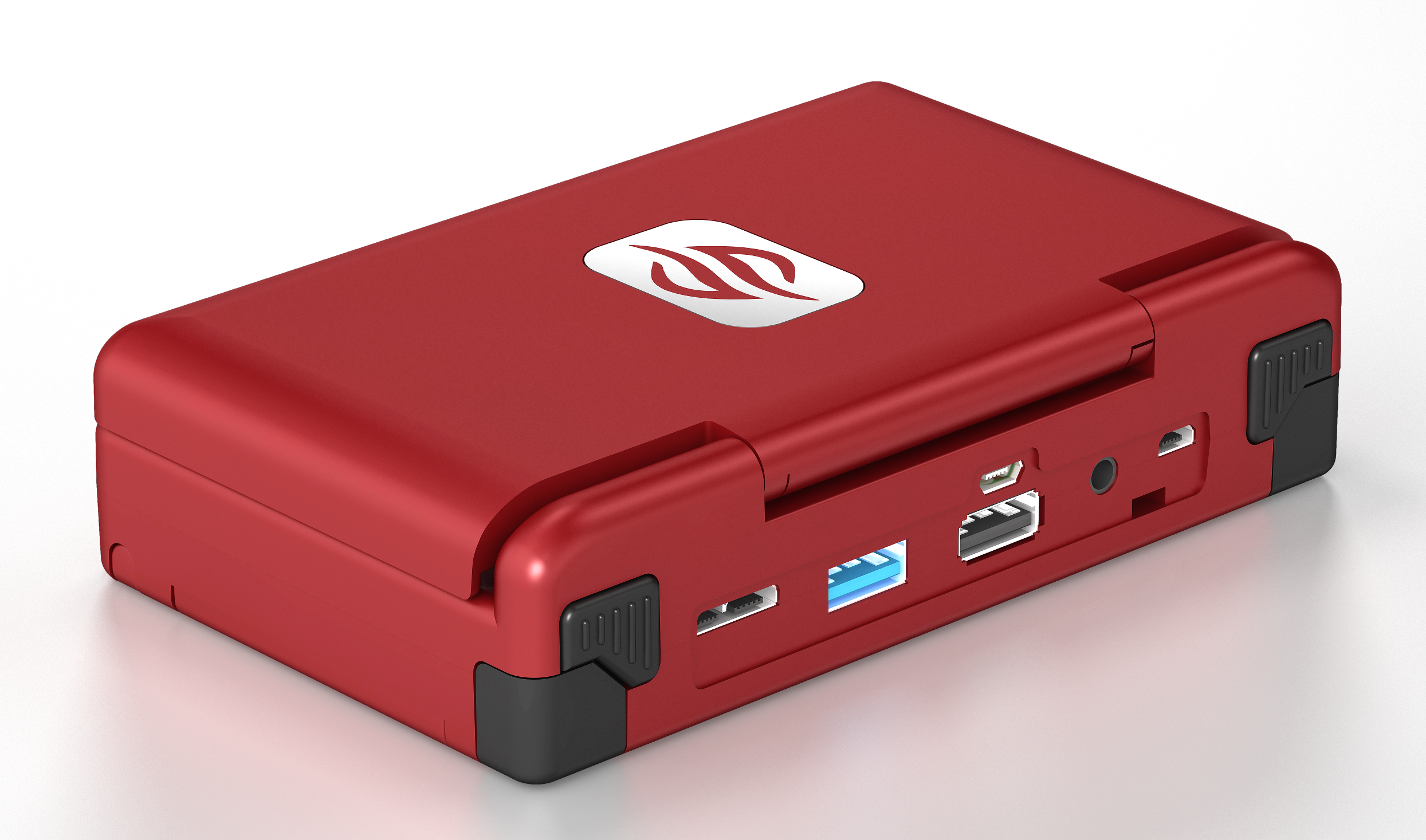
4 USB ports, headphone jack, MicroHDMI

The Dragonbox Pyra contains only one proprietary blob (GPU driver), but the Mobile (phone) Edition has more.

Some hardware components used in phones require drivers (or firmware) to run. For many components, only proprietary drivers are available (open source phones usually seek components with open drivers.) If firmware is not updatable and does not have control over any other part of the phone, it might be considered equivalent to part of the hardware. However, these conditions do not hold for cellular modems.

As of 2019, all available mobile phones have a proprietary baseband chip (GSM module, cellular modem), except for the Necuno, which has no such chip and communicates by peer-to-peer VoIP. The modem is usually integrated with the system-on-a-chip and the memory. This presents security concerns; baseband attacks can read and alter data on the phone remotely.

The Librem 5 mobile segregates the modem from the system and memory, making it a separate module, a configuration rare in modern cellphones. There is an open-source baseband project, OsmocomBB.

=== Operating system: middleware and user interface ===
Family tree of Maemo

Generally, the phones included on this list contain copyleft software other than the Linux kernel and minimal closed-source component drivers.

- Android-based devices do not appear on this list because of the heavy use of proprietary components, particularly drivers and applications.
- There are many custom distributions of Android which seek to replace its proprietary components, such as GrapheneOS (formerly known as CopperheadOS or AndroidHardening) and LineageOS (successor to the now-defunct CyanogenMod), which can be installed on off‑the‑shelf devices. There are also devices utilizing Ubuntu Touch, Droidian, and FuriOS that run GNU/Linux and the Android hardware adaptation layer Halium. Phones natively running these are included.
- There are multiple projects to implement mainline Linux on mobile phones. Mobian is an open-source project focusing on Debian on mobile devices. postmarketOS is based on Alpine Linux. Arch Linux ARM-based Manjaro is focusing on PinePhone hardware.
- WebOS (LG Electronics) was initially available only under a proprietary license but the source code was later released under a free permissive license by HP. Open WebOS will not run on all WebOS devices. LuneOS is a Halium-based fork of WebOS.
- Firefox OS was released under a permissive MIT license but its KaiOS successor is proprietary; the former is included.
- All Maemo, MeeGo, and Sailfish OS devices running open Maemo Leste or Mer middleware are included.
- Open QTMoko/OpenMoko phones using Qt Extended are included in the list.

It is often possible to install a wide variety of open-source operating systems on any open-source phone; the higher-level software is designed to be largely interchangeable and independent of the hardware.

There are also an increasing number of phones that come with a proprietary operating system pre-installed (usually Android), but allow the user to install mainline Linux (such as the Fairphone 5 and SHIFTphone 8). These are listed under § Devices with third-party support.

== Devices with formal support ==
These are mobiles that can be ordered with the open-source software pre-installed. Some models also offer the option to be ordered with a proprietary OS pre-installed.

Release date	Model	Organization	Operating system	Operating system support	Current state	Price
2027	Motorola Signature	Motorola Mobility	GrapheneOS	Yes	In development	TBC
2027	Motorola Razr Fold	Motorola Mobility	GrapheneOS	Yes	In development	TBC
2027	Motorola Razr Ultra	Motorola Mobility	GrapheneOS	Yes	In development	TBC
2025-12-05	Jolla Phone (2026)	Jolla	Sailfish OS	Yes	Shipping	preorders currently: 649€
2025-06-25	Fairphone 6	Fairphone	/e/OS, IodéOS	Yes	Shipping	€599
TBC	NEXX	Liberux	LiberuxOS (Based on Debian)	Yes	In development	£681
2024-10	Volla Phone Quintus	Volla Systeme GmbH	Volla OS (based on Android Open Source Project), Ubuntu Touch, multiboot option	Yes	Shipping	€719
2024-06	FuriPhone FLX1	FuriLabs	FuriOS (based on Debian)	Yes	Shipping	$550
2023-08	Fairphone 5	Fairphone	/e/OS, CalyxOS, IodéOS, LineageOS, postmarketOS, Ubuntu Touch	Yes	Shipping	€549 (128GB Storage, 6GB RAM) €629 (256GB Storage, 8GB RAM)
2023-05	Volla Phone X23	Hallo Welt Systeme UG	Volla OS (based on Android Open Source Project), Ubuntu Touch, multiboot option	Yes	Shipping	€524
2022	Mudita Pure	Mudita	MuditaOS (GPLv3, based on FreeRTOS)	Yes	shipping used handsets	$370 ($310 used from manufacturer)
2022	uConsole (mobile option)	ClockworkPi	Debian, Ubuntu, or Raspberry Pi OS; Debian-based Clockwork OS, OS can be swapped by swapping an SD card	Yes	Shipping	$139-$209 (1-6 CPU cores, 1-4 GB RAM), +$50 for mobile extension
2022	Volla Phone 22	Hallo Welt Systeme UG	Volla OS (based on Android Open Source Project), Ubuntu Touch, Droidian	Yes	Shipping	€452
2021-12	PinePhone Pro	Pine64	Manjaro Linux with KDE's Plasma Mobile by default;	Yes. 20+ other (mostly Linux) operating systems can be swapped by swapping an SD card.	sale discontinued, but supported	$399
2022-07	F(x)tec Pro^{1} X	FX Technology Limited.	Ubuntu Touch, Droidian, LineageOS or Android	?	shipping	$899
2021	Volla Phone X	Hallo Welt Systeme UG	Volla OS (based on Android Open Source Project), Ubuntu Touch	Yes	Shipping	
2020-Q4	Fairphone 4	Fairphone	/e/OS, CalyxOS, DivestOS, IodéOS, LineageOS, postmarketOS, Ubuntu Touch	Yes	Shipping	€529
2020-12 (started shipping pre-orders)	DragonBox Pyra Mobile Edition	OpenPandora GmbH	Debian	Yes	shipping pre-ordered backlog	€600/€626 (2/4 GB RAM)
2020-11	Volla Phone	Hallo Welt Systeme UG	Volla OS (based on Android Open Source Project), Ubuntu Touch, Droidian or Sailfish OS	Yes	Shipping	
2020-Q3	Fairphone 3+	Fairphone	/e/OS, DivestOS, LineageOS, Ubuntu Touch	Yes	sale discontinued, but supported	
2019-11	Librem 5	Purism	PureOS, a Debian derivative developed by Purism for their mobiles	PureOS has a lifetime support guarantee	Shipping	$799
2019-11	PinePhone	Pine64	Beta "Braveheart" Edition had a choice of user-installed OS; Later "Community Editions" were sold from June 15, 2020, to February 2, 2021; each sale resulted in a $10 donation per phone to the developer community that wrote the operating system with which it shipped. Subsequently, Pinephones all shipped with Manjaro and Plasma Mobile.	Yes. Twenty-odd different operating systems can be user-installed as of March 2021; OS can be swapped by swapping out an SD card.	Shipping	$199
2019 3Q	Fairphone 3	Fairphone	/e/OS, DivestOS, LineageOS, Ubuntu Touch	Yes	sale discontinued, but supported	
2018	Gemini PDA	Planet Computers	Android, Debian, Sailfish OS		Discontinued	
2018-03 (last updated)	GTA04-based motherboard, fitting inside the shell of a Nokia N900.	Neo900	QtMoko, Debian, SHR (Stable Hybrid Release), Replicant		Stalled	
2016-11-01	Pop Mirage Cyanogen	Alcatel Mobile	CyanogenMod	Discontinued	Discontinued	
2016-02	Meizu PRO 5 Ubuntu Edition	Meizu	Ubuntu Touch	UBports, community-driven	Discontinued	
2015	Zuk Z1	Lenovo	CyanogenMod	Discontinued	Discontinued	
2015	Andromax Q	Smartfen	CyanogenMod	Discontinued	Discontinued	
2015 3Q	Fairphone 2	Fairphone	Fairphone Open OS, /e/OS, LineageOS, Ubuntu Touch	Discontinued	sale discontinued, but supported	
2015-07	Meizu MX4 Ubuntu Edition	Meizu	Ubuntu Touch	UBports, community-driven	Discontinued	
2015-06	BQ Aquaris E5 HD Ubuntu Edition	BQ	Ubuntu Touch	UBports, community-driven	Discontinued	
2015-02	BQ Aquaris E4.5 Ubuntu Edition	BQ	Ubuntu Touch	UBports, community-driven	Discontinued	
2015	BQ Aquaris X5 Cyanogen Edition	BQ	CyanogenMod, postmarketOS	postmarketOS, community driven	Discontinued	
2015	Wileyfox Storm	Wileyfox	CyanogenMod	Discontinued	Discontinued	
2015	Wileyfox Swift	Wileyfox	CyanogenModpostmarketOS	postmarketOS, community-driven	Discontinued	
2015	YU Yureka; YU Yureka Plus	YU Televentures (Micromax Informatics)	CyanogenMod	Discontinued	Discontinued	
2015	YU Yuphoria	YU Televentures (Micromax Informatics)	CyanogenMod	Discontinued	Discontinued	
2014	OnePlus One	OnePlus	CyanogenMod	Discontinued	Discontinued	
2014	GeeksPhone Revolution	GeeksPhone	Firefox OS	Discontinued; formerly developed by the Mozilla Foundation under the Mozilla Public License, later proprietized as KaiOS	Discontinued	
2013-11 (cancellation)	GeeksPhone Peak+	GeeksPhone	Firefox OS	Discontinued; formerly developed by the Mozilla Foundation under the Mozilla Public License, later proprietized as KaiOS	Cancelled	
2013-07	Alcatel One Touch Fire	Alcatel	Firefox OS	Discontinued; formerly developed by the Mozilla Foundation under the Mozilla Public License, later proprietized as KaiOS	Discontinued	
2013-07	ZTE Open	ZTE	Firefox OS	Discontinued; formerly developed by the Mozilla Foundation under the Mozilla Public License, later proprietized as KaiOS	Discontinued	
2013-04-23	GeeksPhone Keon	GeeksPhone	Firefox OS	Discontinued; formerly developed by the Mozilla Foundation under the Mozilla Public License, later proprietized as KaiOS	Discontinued	
2013-04-23	GeeksPhone Peak	GeeksPhone	Firefox OS	Discontinued; formerly developed by the Mozilla Foundation under the Mozilla Public License, later proprietized as KaiOS	Discontinued	
2012-04	GTA04	Golden Delicious	QtMoko, Debian, SHR (Stable Hybrid Release), Replicant		"Currently not in stock"	
2011	Developer phone	Aava mobile	MeeGo	Discontinued	Discontinued (was available to developers only)	
2011	N950	Nokia	MeeGo 1.2 Harmattan	Discontinued; formerly hosted by the Linux Foundation	Discontinued (available to developers only)	
2011	N9	Nokia	MeeGo 1.2 Harmattan	Discontinued; formerly hosted by the Linux Foundation	Discontinued	
2009-11-11	N900	Nokia	Maemo 5 (Fremantle) (some proprietary components until Maemo Leste)	Discontinued	Discontinued	
2008-06-24	Neo FreeRunner (code name GTA02)	OpenMoko	Openmoko/QTMoko Linux, Debian, SHR (Stable Hybrid Release), Gentoo (all Linux-based), Inferno		Discontinued	
2007-07-09	Neo 1973 (code name GTA01)	OpenMoko	Openmoko Linux (Linux-based)		Discontinued	
2006	Eten G500	E-TEN	GPE Palmtop Environment		Discontinued, developer phone	
2006	Greenphone	Trolltech	Qtopia		Discontinued, developer phone	

== Devices with third-party support ==
Release date	Model	Organization	Operating system	Operating system support	Current state	Price
2021	SHIFT6mq	SHIFT	Shift-OS (Android), postmarketOS	partial mainline Linux support	shipping (sold-out, likely out-of-production)	
2024 or later	SHIFTphone 8	Shiftphone	Preinstalled with ShiftOS (Android 14), but with mainline Linux support, allowing the operating system to be replaced by the end user.	Yes	pre-order	€599
2023	Fairphone 5	Fairphone	Preinstalled with Fairphone OS (Android, not open-source), but the user can replace it with CalyxOS, /e/OS (Murena), iodéOS, and postmarketOS	Yes	Shipping	€699
2022-01-19 (originally 2019)	XFone Mobile Pro (re-launched Xiaomi Redmi Note 8 Pro with Ubuntu Touch)	SageTea	Ubuntu Touch	UBports, community-driven	Shipping	
2021-06-19 (originally 2019)	XFone Mobile (re-launched Google Pixel 3a with Ubuntu Touch)	SageTea	Ubuntu Touch	UBports, community-driven	Shipping	
2018-05-21	OnePlus 6, OnePlus 6T	OnePlus	multiple	partial mainline Linux support	Discontinued, used market	
2018-08-22	Pocophone F1	Xiaomi	multiple	partial mainline Linux support	Discontinued, used markets	
	Snapdragon 410/412 based phones	multiple	postmarketOS	partial mainline Linux support	Discontinued	

== Distributions for existing phones ==
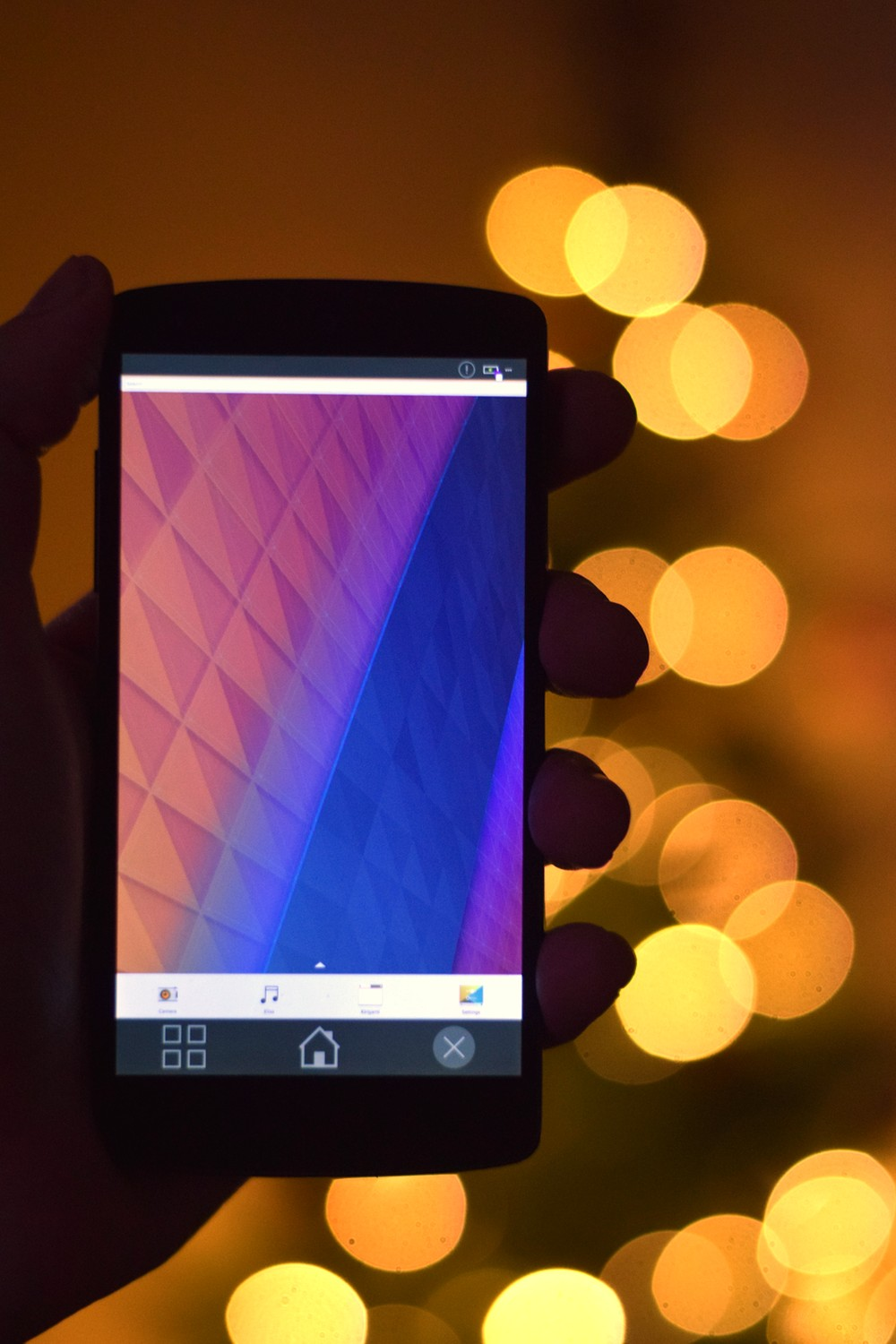
KDE Plasma Mobile running on postmarketOS on the Nexus 5

Nura, Ubports, Mobian and KDE Neon are open-source distributions running on existing smartphones originally running Android. Maemo Leste is available for Nokia N900 and Motorola Droid 4.

A database exists listing older phones capable of running open-source operating systems.

== Custom-made phones ==
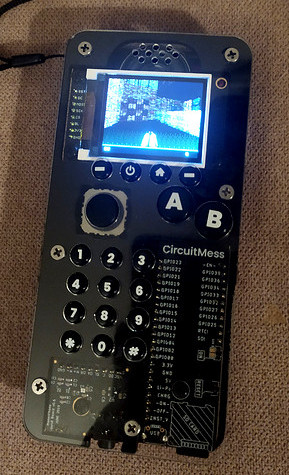
A CircuitMess Ringo phone, running a video game

It is possible to home-build a phone from partially open hardware and software. The Arduinophone (touchscreen) and the MIT DIY Cellphone (segmented display) both use the Arduino open-hardware single-board computer, with added components. CircuitMess Ringo (previously MakerPhone) is another DIY Arduino phone with open-source firmware and available schematics, focusing on education. The PiPhone, ZeroPhone and OURphone are similar, but based on the Raspberry Pi.

The main components required to construct an open mobile phone include a back cover, a touch screen, a battery, and a logic board. The Paxo Phone is also an open-source option.

== See also ==
- Comparison of open-source mobile phones (features)
- List of open-source hardware projects
