= Nura (operating system) =

Free and open-source operating system for smartphones, based on Alpine Linux

- Logo used since 2026

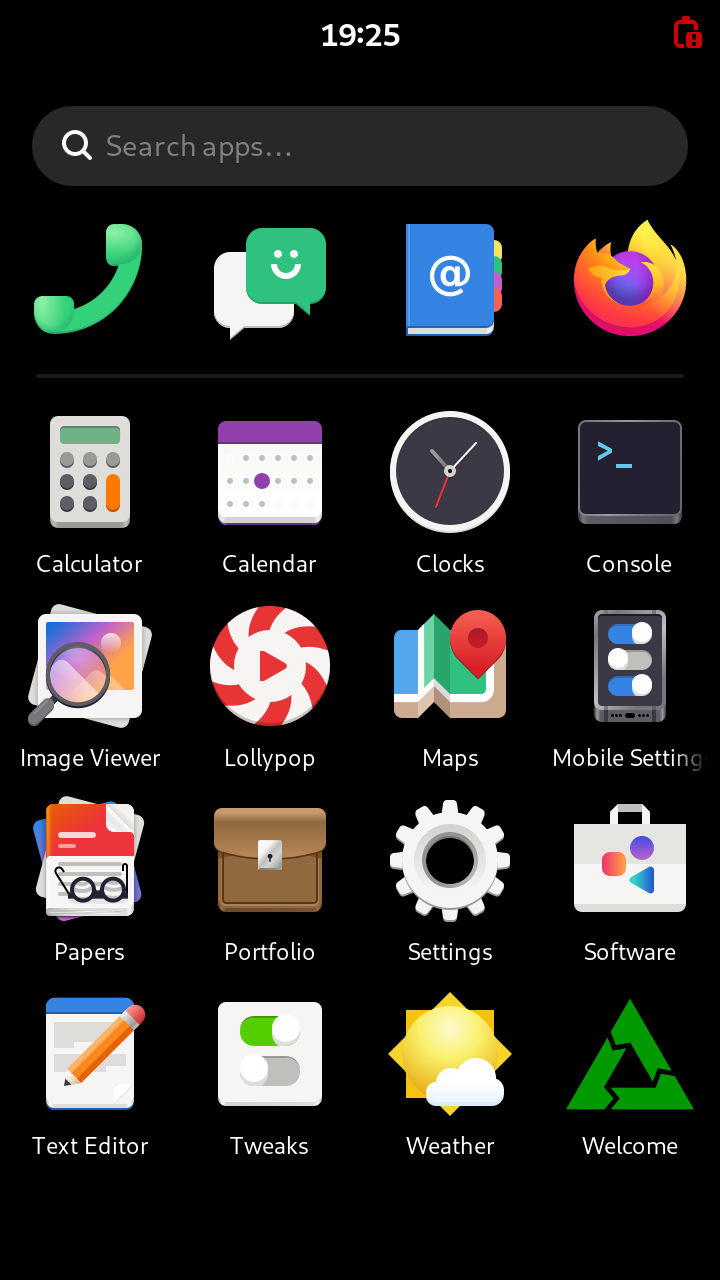
- Nura running Phosh
- Developer: Nura open-source community
- OS family: Linux (Unix-like)
- Working state: Active
- Source model: Open source
- Initial release: 26 May 2017; 9 years ago
- Latest release: 26.06 (Alpen Avocado) / 21 June 2026; 4 months ago
- Repository: https://gitlab.nura.eco/nura/pmaports
- Marketing target: Operating system replacement for Android and other mobile devices
- Available in: English, Czech, German, French, Italian, Spanish, etc.
- Update method: apk-tools (package manager)
- Package manager: apk-tools (from Alpine Linux)
- Supported platforms: ARM, ARM64, x86, x86-64
- Kernel type: Monolithic (Linux)
- Default user interface: GNOME, Phosh, Sway, Sxmo
- Official website: nura.eco

Nura, formerly known as postmarketOS (pmOS), is an operating system primarily for smartphones, based on the Alpine Linux distribution. Developed since 2016, it was launched in 2017, and continues to be a work in progress.

It is capable of running different X and Wayland based user interfaces, such as Plasma Mobile, MATE, GNOME, and XFCE; later updates added support for Unity8 and Phosh. It is also capable of running Docker, if the device specific kernel has cgroups and relevant configs enabled. The project aims to provide a ten-year lifecycle for smartphones.

== History ==
Oliver Smith started developing postmarketOS in 2016. The operating system was launched on 26 May 2017, with the source code available on GitHub before migrating to the GitLab Inc.-owned instance of GitLab software in 2018, and later to Nura's own server, also running GitLab software.

On 27 September 2026, at the postmarketOS and Alpine Linux Conference, the project announced that it was renamed to Nura in reference to the nuraghe buildings in Sardinia, comparing the longevity of the structures to the intended longevity of the operating system on the hardware on which it is designed to run. The name change took place due to the length and nonstandard capitalisation of the former name, along with pronunciation challenges in languages other than English.

== Architecture ==
Unlike many other projects porting conventional Linux distributions to Android phones, Nura does not use the Android build system or userspace. Each phone has only one unique package, and flashable installation images are generated using the pmbootstrap tool. The project intends to support the mainline Linux kernel on all phones, instead of the often outdated Android-specific fork, to reduce the potential for security exploits. As of 2017, several devices were able to boot into the mainline kernel. The project aims to support Android apps, originally through the use of Anbox, which was replaced by Waydroid since postmarketOS v21.12.

Alpine Linux was chosen as the base distribution due to its low storage requirements, making it more suitable for older devices. Excluding the kernel, a base installation takes up approximately 6 MB. In March 2024, the maintainers announced that postmarketOS would migrate from OpenRC to systemd as its init system for select user interfaces.

== State of development ==
As of 2025, it is work-in-progress software intended for power users.

=== Features ===
Different tools have been published by the project, including:

- pmbootstrap, a utility to help the process of development with cross compilation;
- osk-sdl, a virtual keyboard to allow entering a decryption password during startup (on a device with full disk encryption);
- charging-sdl, an application contained in the initramfs to display an animation when the phone is charging while off.

=== Device support ===
As of February 2026 an estimated 723 device models are supported. This includes many smartphones and tablets that originally ran Android, some Windows 10 (or 8.1) Mobile based Lumia phones, as well as some Linux-based Nokia smartphones, such as the N900 and N9. After Corellium's Project Sandcastle ported the Linux kernel to some iPhone versions, postmarketOS was also seen to boot on it, although no persistent flashing is supported at the moment. As of May 2021, support for wearable devices (including Google Glass and smartwatches like the LG G Watch) has been improved through integration with the AsteroidOS user interface and work on mainline kernel for the LG G Watch R.

In 2018, no devices were yet able to make phone calls with postmarketOS, although significant efforts were being made in this regard. By 2020, a number of devices were fully or mostly supported, including for phone calls, SMS messages and mobile data. These included the BQ Aquaris X5, Librem 5, Nokia N900, Motorola Moto G4 Play, Samsung Galaxy A3 (2015), Samsung Galaxy A5 (2015), and Wileyfox Swift.

Furthermore, the PinePhone launched in 2020, with postmarketOS Community Edition as a first-party operating system.

==== Porting to a new device ====
The development process to make a new device compatible with the operating system consists of creating a phone-specific package using the pmbootstrap tool. For that, the use of the Linux kernel from the device's original manufacturer is often necessary. The source code of the original kernel is often made available by compliance with the requirements of the GPLv2 license, but some drivers necessary for the operation of the device may not be available, and must, therefore, be recreated. Examples include GPU drivers such as Lima, which has a proprietary equivalent in userspace on Android that is not subject to the GPLv2 requirements.

==== Camera support ====
Few devices have received support for camera, with the PinePhone being one example. In regards to the Fairphone, it is a work in progress. It's estimated that around 127 device models have some level of camera support.

==== Voice Over LTE (VoLTE) and Voice over Wifi (Vowifi) support ====
OnePlus6 is a work in progress for Volte support.

== See also ==
- List of open-source mobile phones
- Linux for mobile devices
- Comparison of mobile operating systems
- Mobile operating system
- Linux for mobile devices
