= Librem 5 =

Linux-based 2020 Smartphone

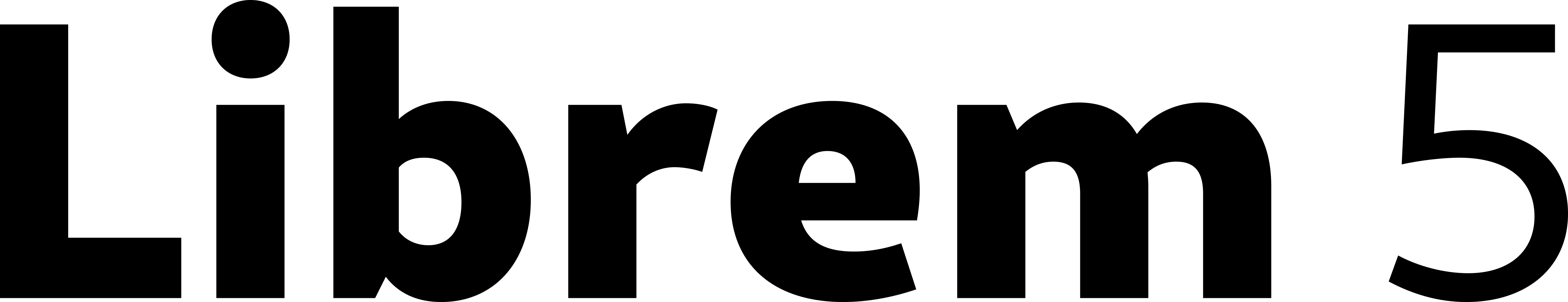

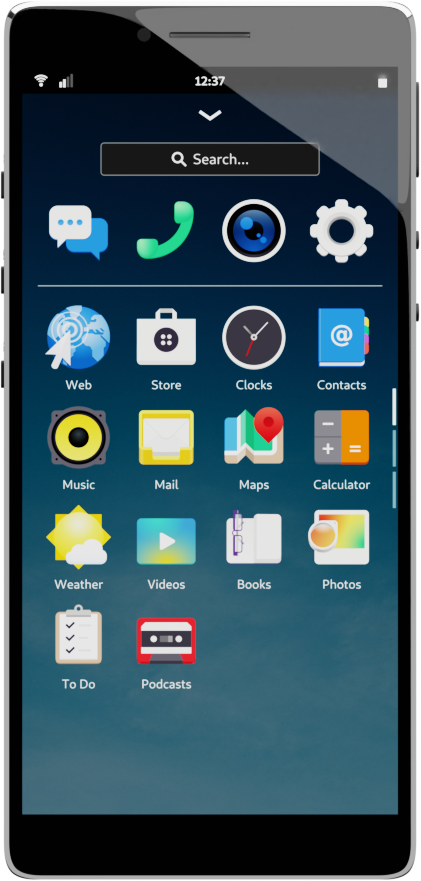
- Brand: Purism
- First released: November 18, 2020; 6 years ago
- Dimensions: 74×152×15 mm (2.91×5.98×0.59 in)
- Weight: 262 g (9 oz)
- Operating system: PureOS/Phosh
- CPU: NXP i.MX 8M Quad core Cortex-A53, 64bit ARM @max 1.5GHz (auxiliary 266MHz Cortex-M4F)
- GPU: Vivante GC7000Lite
- Modem: BroadMobi BM818 baseband
- Memory: Micron 3GB LPDDR4-3200 DRAM
- Storage: Kioxia 32GB eMMC flash memory
- Removable storage: microSD (2TB max)
- Battery: 4500mAh, user-replaceable
- Rear camera: Samsung S5K3L6XX 13.25 MP, LED flash
- Front camera: SK hynix YACG4D0C9SHC 8.0 MP
- Display: Mantix 144mm (5.7″) 720×1440 TFT
- Sound: Wolfson Media WM8962 DAC
- Connectivity: SparkLAN WNFB-266AXI(BT) Wi-Fi 6 802.11 a/b/g/n/ac/ax (2.4GHz/5GHz) and Bluetooth 5.3, 3.5mm headphone/microphone jack, USB-C USB 3.0 PD/DisplayPort, 3FF Smart card reader
- Data inputs: Sensors: ST Teseo-LIV3F multiconstellation GNSS, ST LSM9DS1 accelerometer, gyroscope and magnetometer, Vishay VCNL4040 ambient light and proximity sensor; Other: power and volume buttons, 3 hardware kill switches (cellular modem, Wi-Fi/Bluetooth, cameras/mic; cutting all three simultaneously also depowers the sensors)
- Other: haptic motor, notification LED with pulse-width modulation control of RGB color

The Librem 5 is a smartphone manufactured by Purism that is part of their Librem line of products. The phone is designed with the goal of using free software whenever possible and includes PureOS, a Linux operating system, by default. Like other Librem products, the Librem 5 focuses on privacy and freedom and includes features like hardware kill switches and easily-replaceable components. Its name, with a numerical "5", refers to its screen size, not a release version. After an announcement on 24 August 2017, the distribution of developer kits and limited pre-release models occurred throughout 2019 and most of 2020. The first mass-production version of the Librem 5 was shipped on 18 November 2020.

== History ==
On August 24, 2017, Purism started a crowdfunding campaign for the Librem 5, a smartphone aimed not only to run purely on free software provided in PureOS but to "[focus] on security by design and privacy protection by default". Purism claimed that the phone would become "the world's first ever IP-native mobile handset, using end-to-end encrypted decentralized communication". Purism has cooperated with GNOME in its development of the Librem 5 software. It is planned that KDE and Ubuntu Touch will also be offered as optional interfaces.

The release of the Librem 5 was delayed several times. It was originally planned to launch in January 2019. Purism announced on September 4, 2018 that the launch date would be postponed until April 2019, due to two power management bugs in the silicon and the Europe/North America holiday season. Development kits for software developers, which were shipped out in December 2018 were unaffected by the bugs, since developers normally connect the device to a power outlet rather than rely on the phone battery. In February, the launch date was postponed again to the third quarter of 2019, because of the necessity of further CPU tests.

Specifications and pre-orders, for $649, to increase to $699, were announced in July 2019. On September 5, 2019, Purism announced that shipping was scheduled to occur later that month, but that it would be done as an "iterative" process. The iterative release plan included the announcement of six different "batches" of Librem 5 releases, of which the first four would be limited pre-production models. Each consecutive batch, which consisted of different arboreal-themed code names and release dates, would feature hardware, mechanical, and software improvements. Purism contacted each customer that had pre-ordered to allow them to choose which batch they'd prefer to receive. Pre-mass production batches, in order of release, included code names "Aspen", "Birch", "Chestnut", and "Dogwood". The fifth batch, "Evergreen", would be the official mass-production model, while the sixth batch, "Fir", would be the second mass-production model.

On September 24, 2019, Purism announced that the first batch of limited-production Librem 5 phones (Aspen) had started shipping. A video of an early phone was produced and a shipping and status update was released soon after. However, it was later reported that the Aspen batch had been shipped only to employees and developers. On November 22, 2019, it was reported that the second batch (Birch) would consist of around 100 phones and would be in the hands of backers by the first week of December. In December 2019, Jim Salter of Ars Technica reported "prototype" devices were being received; however, they were not really a "phone" yet. There was no audio when attempting to place a phone call (which was fixed with a software update a few weeks later), and cameras didn't work yet. Reports of the third batch of limited pre-mass-production models (Chestnut) being received by customers and reviewers occurred in January 2020. By May 2020, TechRadar reported that the call quality was fine, though the speaker mode was "a bit quiet", and volume adjustment did not work. According to TechRadar, the 3 to 5-hour battery time and the inability of the phone to charge while turned on was "A stark reminder of the Librem 5's beta status".

On November 18, 2020, Purism announced via press release that they had begun shipping the finished version of the Librem 5, known as "Evergreen". Following its release, in December 2019, Purism announced that it will offer a "Librem 5 USA" version of the phone for the price of $1999, which is assembled in the United States for extra supply chain security. According to Purism CEO Todd Weaver, "having a secure auditable US based supply chain including parts procurement, fabrication, testing, assembly, and fulfillment all from within the same facility is the best possible security story."

A second version of the phone, Librem 5 v2, is slated for release in 2028. The new revision will be one of the earliest non-specialized devices to use the RISC-V processor architecture.

== Hardware ==
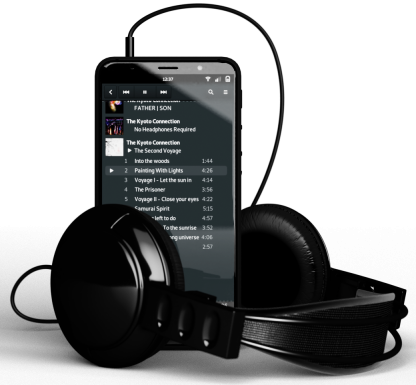
An artist's rendering of the Librem 5 phone

The Librem 5 features an i.MX 8M Quad Core processor with an integrated GPU which supports OpenGL 3.0, OpenGL ES 3.1, Vulkan 1.0 and OpenCL 1.2 with default drivers; however, since the driver used is the open source Etnaviv driver, it currently only supports OpenGL 2.1 and OpenGL ES 2.0. It has 3 GB of RAM, 32 GB of eMMC storage, a 13 MP rear camera, and an 8 MP front camera. The left side of the phone features three hardware kill switches, which cut power to the camera and microphone, Wi-Fi and Bluetooth modem, and the baseband modem.) The device uses a USB-C connector for charging. The 144 mm (5.7-inch) IPS display has a resolution of 1440×720 pixels. It also has a 3.5 mm TRRS headphone/mic jack, a single SIM slot, and a microSD card slot.

=== Battery ===
The Librem 5 is powered by a lithium-ion battery. The capacity of the battery was 2000 mAh in earliest development batches, which was increased to 4500 mAh in the mass-production batch. The battery is designed to be user-replaceable. The battery is unique to Librem 5 and cannot be replaced by any other battery type. In addition, Purism ships replacement batteries only within the US unless combined with another device.

=== Mobile security ===
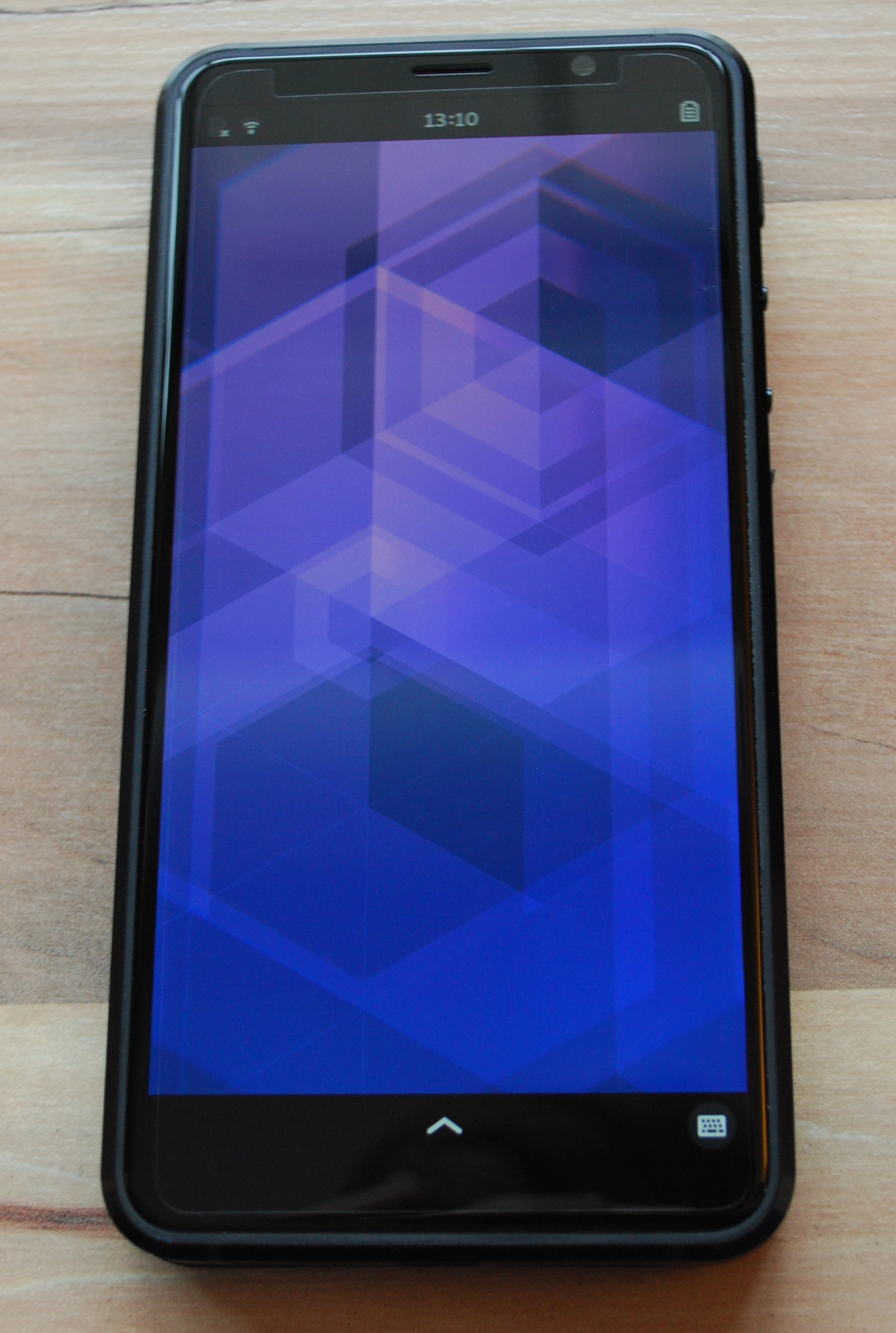
Librem 5 with the default desktop background

The hardware features three hardware kill switches that physically cut off power from both cameras and the microphone, Wi-Fi and Bluetooth, and baseband processor, respectively. Further precautionary measures can be used with Lockdown Mode, which, in addition to powering off the cameras, microphone, WiFi, Bluetooth and cellular baseband, also cuts power to the GNSS, IMU, ambient light and proximity sensor. This is possible due to the fact that these components are not integrated into the system on a chip (SoC) like they are in conventional smartphones. Instead, the cellular baseband and Wi-Fi/Bluetooth components are located on two replaceable M.2 cards, which means that they can be changed to support different wireless standards. The kill switch to cut the circuit to the microphone will prevent the 3.5 mm audio jack being used for acoustic cryptanalysis.

In place of an integrated mobile SoC found in most smartphones, the Librem 5 uses six separate chips: i.MX 8M Quad, Silicon Labs RS9116, Broadmobi BM818 / Gemalto PLS8, STMicroelectronics Teseo-LIV3F, Wolfson Microelectronics WM8962, and Texas Instruments bq25895.

The downside to having dedicated chips instead of an integrated system-on-chip is that it takes more energy to operate separate chips, and the phone's circuit boards are much larger. On the other hand, using separate components means longer support from the manufacturers than with mobile SoCs, which have short support timelines. According to Purism, the Librem 5 is designed to avoid planned obsolescence and will receive lifetime software updates.

The Librem 5 is the first phone to contain a smartcard reader, in which an OpenPGP card can be inserted for secure cryptographic operations. Purism plans to use OpenPGP cards to implement storage of GPG keys, disk unlocking, secure authentication, a local password vault, protection of sensitive files, user persons, and travel persons.

To promote better security, all the source code in the root file system is free/open source software and can be reviewed by the user. Purism publishes the schematics of the Librem 5's printed circuit boards (PCBs) under the GPL 3.0+ license, and publishes X-rays of the phone, so that the user can verify that there haven't been any changes to the hardware, such as inserted spy chips.

== Software ==
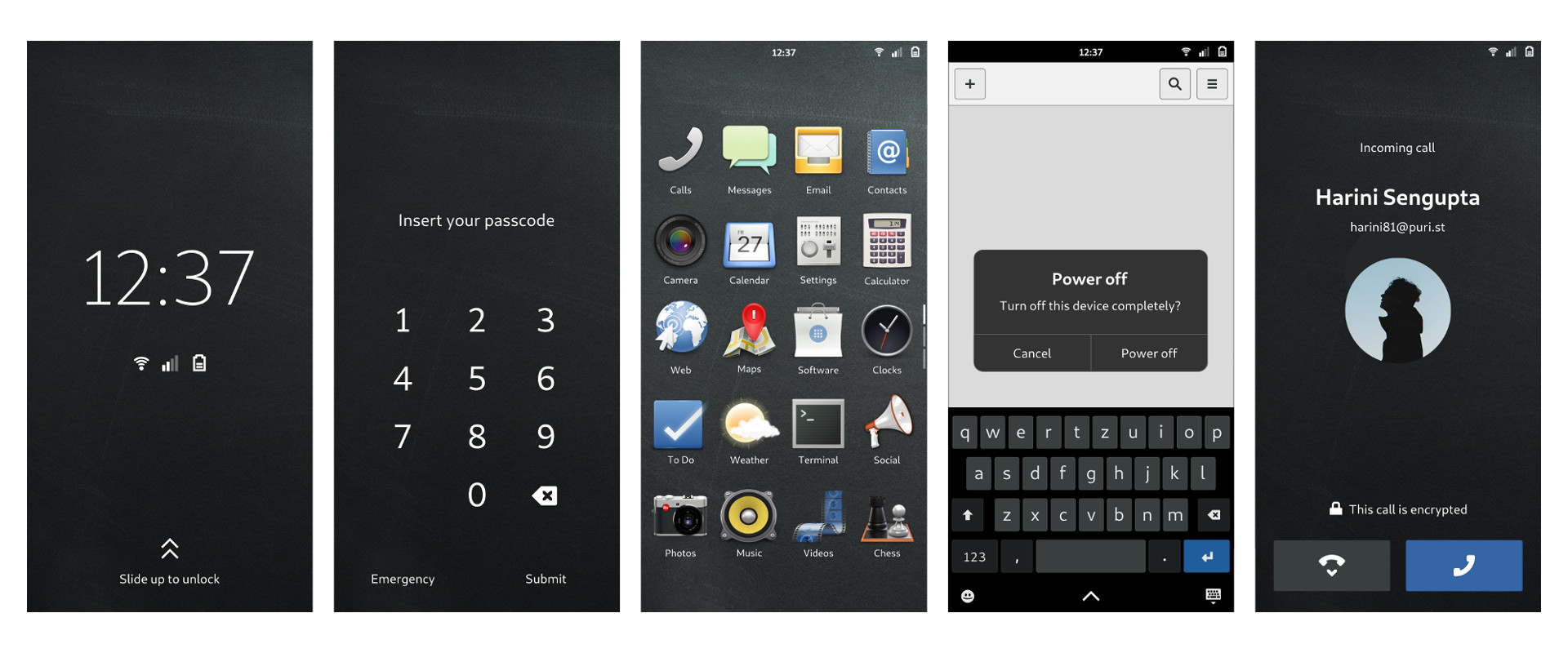
Early designs of Phosh, the GNOME mobile shell, developed by Purism and GNOME (2018-05)

The Librem 5 ships with Purism's PureOS, a Debian Linux derivative. The operating system uses a new mobile user interface developed by Purism called Phosh, a portmanteau from "phone shell". It is based on Wayland, wlroots, GTK 3, and GNOME. Unlike other mobile Linux interfaces, such as Ubuntu Touch and KDE Plasma Mobile, Phosh is based on tight integration with the desktop Linux software stack, which Purism developers believe will make it easier to maintain in the long-term and incorporate into existing desktop Linux distributions. Phosh has been packaged in a number of desktop distros (Debian, Arch, Manjaro, Fedora and openSUSE) and is used by eight of the sixteen Linux ports for the PinePhone.

The phone is a convergence device: if connected to a keyboard, monitor, and mouse, it can run Linux applications as a desktop computer would. Many desktop Linux applications can run on the phone as well, albeit possibly without a touch-friendly UI.

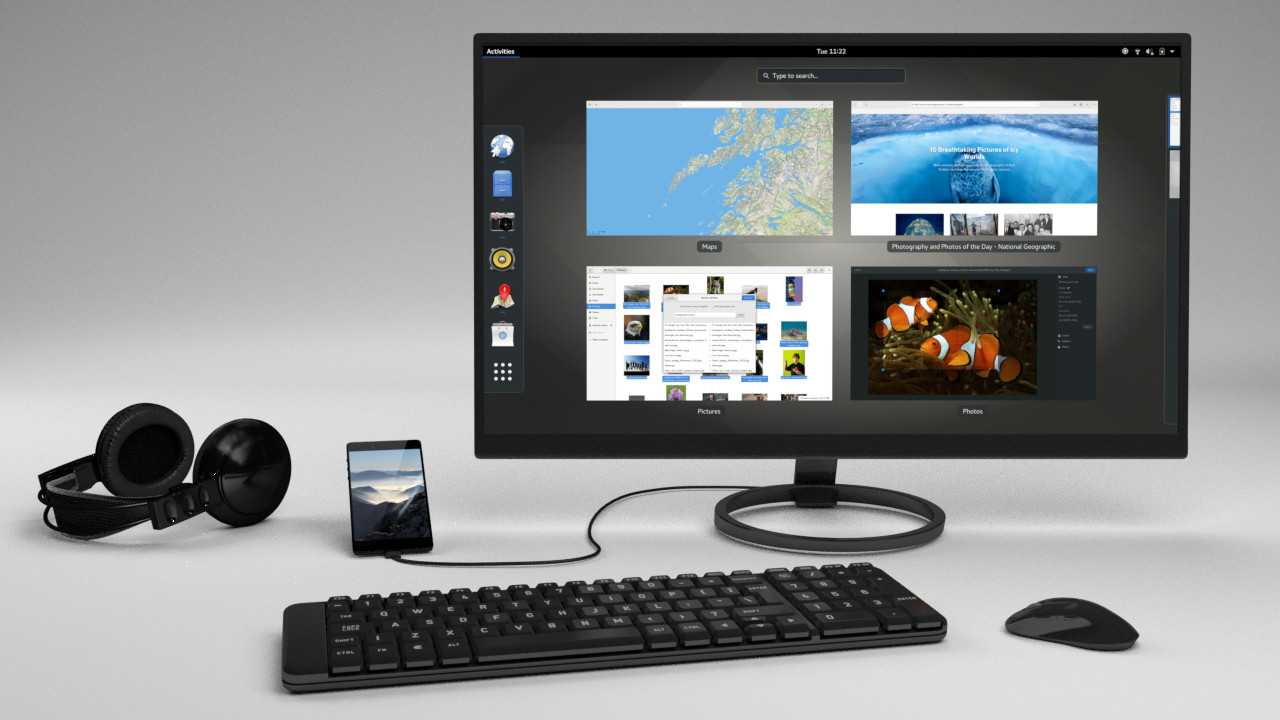
The mobile/desktop convergence: the Librem 5 phone, when connected to a keyboard, screen, and mouse, runs as a desktop computer.

Purism is taking a unique approach to convergence by downsizing existing desktop software to reuse it in a mobile environment. Purism has developed the libhandy library (now replaced with Libadwaita) to make GTK software adaptive so its interface elements adjust to smaller mobile screens. In contrast, other companies such as Microsoft and Samsung with Ubuntu (and Canonical before Unity8) tried to achieve convergence by having separate sets of software for the mobile and desktop PC environments. Most iOS apps, Android apps and Plasma Mobile's Kirigami implement convergence by upsizing existing mobile apps to use them in a desktop interface.

Purism claims that the "Librem 5 will be the first ever Matrix-powered smartphone, natively using end-to-end encrypted decentralised communication in its dialer and messaging app".

Purism was unable to find a free/open-source cellular modem, so the phone uses a modem with proprietary hardware, but isolates it from the rest of the components rather than having it integrated with the system on a chip (SoC). This prevents code on the modem from being able to read or modify data going to and from the SoC.

== See also ==
- Comparison of open-source mobile phones
- List of open-source mobile phones
- Microphone blocker
- Modular smartphone
- PinePhone
- Libadwaita
