= Necuno =

Necuno NC_1
- Brand: Necuno
- Operating system: a variety of open-source mobile operating systems, including PureOS, Ubuntu Touch, postmarketOS, Maemo Lese, Nemo Mobile and LuneOS
- CPU: NXP® i.MX 8M Quad core (40nm) Cortex A9, 32bit @max 1.2 GHz 4x Cortex-A9 MP, 32-bit
- GPU: Vivante GC2000, 4 VEC-4 shaders / 16 VEC-1 shaders, 594 MHz, 200 million triangles/second
- Modem: No cellular modem
- Memory: 1 GB
- Storage: 8 GB
- Battery: 3500 mAh, user-replaceable but screen must be removed
- Rear camera: MIPI CSI-2 4-lane parallel camera port
- Display: 5.0"
- Sound: Simple Sensor Interface protocol, two speakers
- Connectivity: Wi-Fi via SDIO, WF1801, single band (2.4 GHz); Micro-USB 2.0, with data transfer disabled for security reasons; 3.5mm headphone jack/microphone jack
- Data inputs: has no sensors (except microphone) for security reasons (no GPS, accelerometer, ambient light sensor, gyroscope, magnetometer, or proximity sensor)
- Other: 100 Mb/s ethernet port, programmable spare button, aluminium case. No proprietary firmware will have memory access.

The Necuno was a phone-like mobile device exclusively manufactured in Finland. The device was designed with a focus on enhancing security and user privacy by omitting the cellular modem, which prevented its use on conventional mobile phone networks. Instead it offered VOIP via a peer-to-peer encrypted communication platform called Ciphra. Standard cellular connectivity was planned for later versions.

The Necuno was mostly open-source, apart from an isolated firmware blob without access to the main memory, used in the Wi-Fi driver for regulatory reasons. The device used Plasma Mobile by default, but it can run a variety of open-source mobile operating systems. It also had an ethernet port.

== See also ==
- Comparison of open-source mobile phones
