= Baseband processor =

Device for radio functions in smartphones

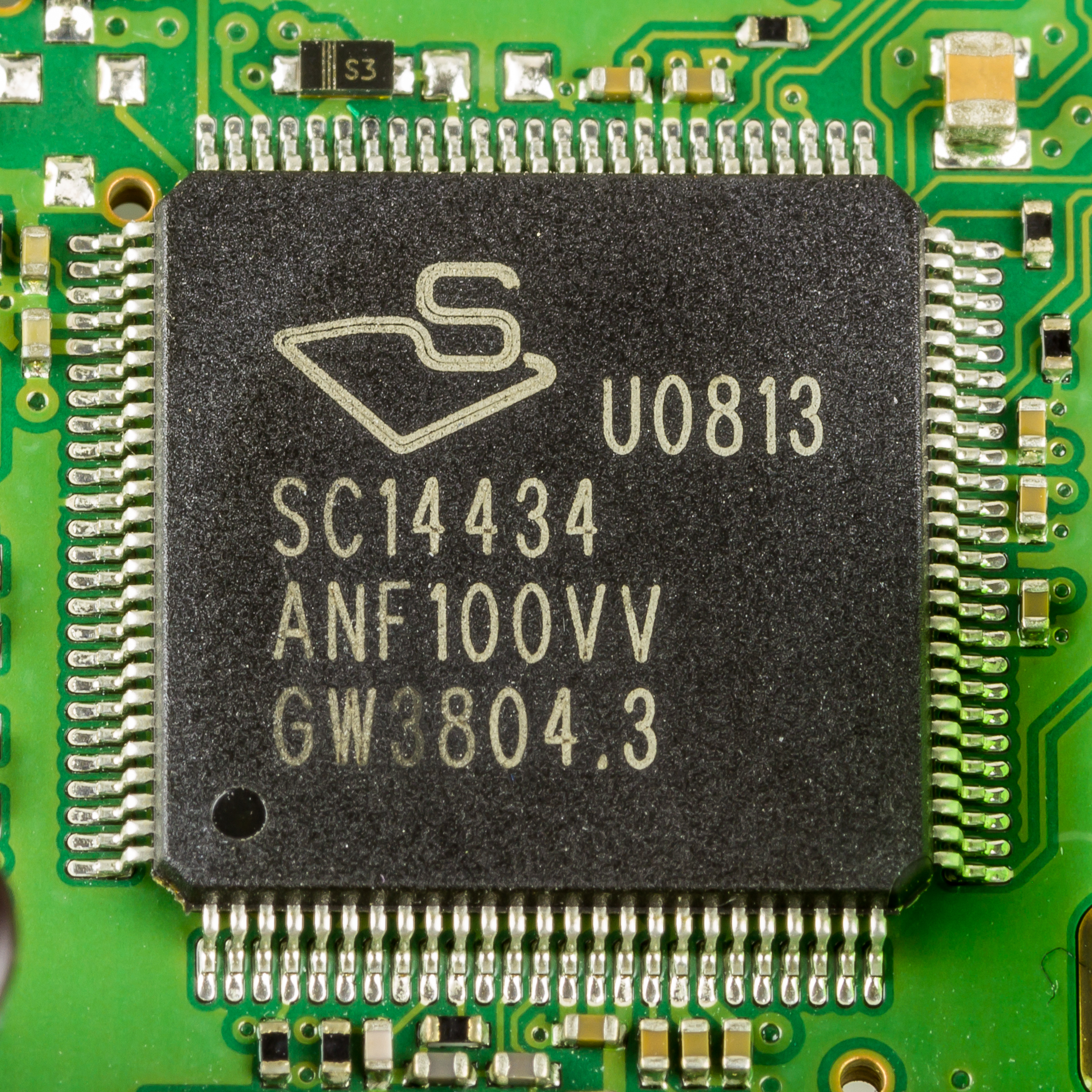
Baseband processor SiTel SC14434

A baseband processor (also known as a baseband radio processor, BP or BBP) is a device (a chip or part of a chip) in a network interface controller that manages all the radio functions (all functions that require an antenna), usually acting as a modem for 3GPP networks (such as 4G or 5G; however, this term is generally not used in reference to Wi-Fi and Bluetooth radios. A baseband processor typically uses its own RAM and firmware. Baseband processors are typically fabricated using CMOS (complementary metal–oxide–semiconductor) or RF CMOS technology, and are widely used in radio-frequency (RF), GPS and wireless WAN communications.

== Overview ==
Baseband processors typically run a real-time operating system (RTOS) as their firmware, such as ENEA's OSE, Nucleus RTOS (iPhone 3G/3GS/iPad), ThreadX (iPhone 4) and VRTX. There are more than a few significant manufacturers of baseband processors, including Broadcom, Icera, Intel Mobile Communications (former Infineon wireless division), MediaTek, Qualcomm, Spreadtrum and ST-Ericsson.

The rationale of separating the baseband processor from the main processor (known as the application processor or AP or) is threefold:

Radio performance
Radio control functions (signal modulation, encoding, radio frequency shifting, etc.) are highly timing-dependent and require a real-time operating system.
Radio reliability
Separating the BP into a different component ensures proper radio operation while allowing application and OS changes.
Legal
Some authorities (e.g. the U.S. Federal Communications Commission (FCC)) require that the entire software stack running on a device which communicates with the mobile telephony network must be certified. Separating the BP into a different component allows reusing a stack without having to recertify the full AP.

== Security concerns ==
Since the software which runs on baseband processors is usually proprietary, it is impossible to perform an independent code audit. By reverse engineering some of the baseband chips, researchers have found security vulnerabilities that could be used to access and modify data on the phone remotely. In March 2014, makers of the free Android derivative Replicant announced they had found a backdoor in the baseband software of Samsung Galaxy phones that allows remote access to the user data stored on the phone.

== See also ==
- OsmocomBB - free software for baseband processors
