= List of open-source hardware projects =

This is a list of open-source hardware projects, including computer systems and components, cameras, radio, telephony, science education, machines and tools, robotics, renewable energy, home automation, medical and biotech, automotive, prototyping, test equipment, and musical instruments.

== Communications ==
=== Amateur radio ===
- Homebrew D-STAR Radio
- HackRF One

=== Audio electronics ===
- Monome 40h – reconfigurable grid of 64 backlit buttons, used via USB; a limited batch of 500 was produced; all design process, specifications, firmware, and PCB schematics are available online
- Neuros Digital Audio Computer – portable digital audio player
- Arduinome
- MIDIbox – modular DIY hardware–software platform for MIDI devices including controllers, synthesizers, sequencers

=== Telephony ===
- Openmoko – phone framework (first use case: First International Computer (FIC) Neo FreeRunner, released as of mid-2008
- OpenBTS and OsmoBTS – software-based GSM base stations
- Project Ara – modular design, hot swapping pluggable mobile phone; due to enter trial production in 2015, but was suspended in 2016
- PiPhone and ZeroPhone
- Telecom Infra Project – collaborative Open Compute Project focusing on optical broadband networks and open cellular networks to create global access
- PinePhone – developed by computer manufacturer Pine64, intended for allowing the user to have full hardware and software control over the device, released as of end-2019

=== Video electronics ===
- Milkymist One – video synthesizer for interactive and dance-directed VJing
- Neuros OSD – digital video recorder

=== Networking ===
- NetFPGA – hardware platform, software, community, and education material to enable research and education effort in a line-rate network environment

==== Wireless networking ====
- OpenPicus – platform for smart sensors and Internet of things
- Sun SPOT – hardware–software platform for sensor networks and battery powered, wireless, embedded development
- USRP – universal software radio peripheral is a mainboard with snap in modules providing software defined radio at different frequencies, has USB 2.0 link to a host computer
- PowWow Power Optimized Hardware and Software FrameWork for Wireless Motes – hardware–software platform for wireless sensor networks
- Twibright RONJA – free-space optic system, 10 Mbit/s full duplex/1.4 km
- SatNOGS – software-hardware project of a global low Earth orbit satellite ground station, including for data and Internet

== Electronics ==
=== Cameras ===
- AXIOM – digital cinema camera built by apertus° community
- Elphel, Inc. – cameras based on free hardware–software designs

=== Computer systems ===
- Arduino – open-source microcontroller board
- The Bus Pirate – universal bus interface and programmer
- Chumby – information ambient device
- Color Maximite – open-source single-board computer running the BASIC language as its operating system and compatible with Arduino Uno micro-controller peripherals
- CUBIT – multitouch surface-interaction system
- Humane Reader and Humane PC
- LART
- Micro Bit – ARM-based embedded system
- MIPS – a reduced instruction set computer (RISC) instruction set architecture
- N8VEM
- Netduino – microcontroller board, .NET Micro Framework based
- NodeMCU – Wi-Fi microcontroller board
- Novena – an ARM based computer built by Andrew Huang and associates
- NVIDIA Deep Learning Accelerator (NVDLA) – AI accelerator for training neural networks, created by Nvidia
- OpenPOWER – Power ISA, an open-source hardware instruction set architecture initiated by IBM
- OpenSPARC – Sun's, later Oracle's high-performance processor
- Parallax Propeller – a multi-core microcontroller with eight 32-bit RISC cores
- Parallella – single-board computer with a manycore coprocessor and field-programmable gate array (FPGA)
- Pinebook – Notebook from Pine64
- RISC-V – an open-source hardware instruction set architecture
- SparkFun Electronics – microcontroller development boards, breakout boards
- Turris Omnia – open-source SOHO network router

=== Peripherals ===
- Nitrokey – USB key for data and email encryption and strong authentication
- System76 Launch – US-manufactured Mechanical keyboard line designed and built by System76 with open-source firmware
- 'Faire Computermaus' / 'fairtrade computer mice' by Fair IT yourself e.V.

=== Robotics ===
- ArduCopter – Arduino-based drone
- e-puck mobile robot – mobile robot designed for education
- ICub – 1 metre high humanoid robot
- OpenRAVE
- RobotCub – predecessor of ICub
- Spykee
- multiplo
- OpenROV – telerobotic submarine
- Salvius
- Thymio – robot for education
- TurtleBot

=== Microcontrollers ===
- Freeduino – an open-source physical computing platform based on a simple input/output (I/O) board and an integrated development environment implementing the open source language Processing – Wiring; also clones of this platform including Freeduino
- Tinkerforge – a platform made of stackable microcontrollers for interfacing with sensors and other I/O devices

=== Components ===
- Ethernut – embedded Ethernet adapters
- IOIO – a board that allows Android applications to interface with external electronics
- PLAICE – a device that combines a flash memory programmer, in-circuit emulation, and a multichannel logic analyzer. It runs uClinux.
- Twibrigh RONJA – a 10 Mbit/s full duplex FSO wireless optical network adapter from 2001
- System76 Thelio Io – System76 Thelio desktops use an open-source daughterboard to control thermals and other functions. This is a step toward building a fully open-source computer and give users full control over their hardware.

=== CPUs ===
- Amber is an ARM-compatible 32-bit RISC processor. Amber implements the ARMv2 instruction set.
- LEON, a 32-bit, SPARC-like CPU created by the European Space Agency
- OpenPOWER, based on IBM's POWER8 and newer multicore processor designs
- OpenSPARC, a series of open-source microprocessors based on the UltraSPARC T1 and UltraSPARC T2 multicore processor designs
- Parallax P8X32A Propeller is a multicore microcontroller with an emphasis on general-purpose use
- ZPU, a small, portable CPU core with a GCC toolchain. It is designed to be compiled targeting FPGA
- OpenRISC 1200, an implementation of the open source OpenRISC 1000 RISC architecture

== Environmental ==
- Open Source Ecology

=== Renewable energy ===
- DIY wind turbines

=== Lighting and LED ===
- LED Throwies – nondestructive graffiti and light displays

== Neither electronic nor mechanical ==
=== Architecture and design ===
- WikiHouse – project to design and build houses
- OpenStructures – design from furniture to house

== Machines and production tools ==
=== Automotive ===
==== Complete vehicles ====
===== Land =====
- Rally Fighter – made by Local Motors
- OpenXC
- OScar
- Wikispeed
- OSVehicle Tabby

===== Airplanes =====
- MakerPlane

==== Engine control units ====
- SECU-3 – gasoline engine control unit

==== Electric vehicle chargers ====
- OpenEVSE – charger for electric cars

=== 3D printers and scanners ===
- RepRap project – 3D printer-fabber; recyclebots, like the Lyman filament extruder, provide the filament for RepRaps
- LulzBot – 3D printer design by Aleph Objects; is Respects Your Freedom certified by the Free Software Foundation
- Voron Design – nonprofit organization developing specifications for 3D printers, including the Voron 0.2, Voron 2.4, and Voron Trident

=== CNC milling machines ===
- FarmBot
- Maslow CNC - an open source CNC router project notable for low cost and unique vertical design

=== Other hardware ===
- Open Source Ecology's Global Village Construction Set (GVCS) – 50 industrial machines needed to build a small civilization with modern comforts
- Precious Plastic's – plastic recycling tools – Shredder, Extruder, Injector, Compressor, and supplemental resources
- Defense Distributed/Liberator (gun)

- Charon (gun)
- FGC-9 (gun)

== Science ==
=== Medical devices ===
- Open Prosthetics Project – design of open-source prosthetics
- Open-source ventilator

=== Scientific hardware ===
- Open-Source Lab – documents dozens of scientific tools, but is closed-source itself
- OpenBCI – EEG amplifier
- OpenFlexure Microscope – Laboratory-grade, digital, robotic microscope

== Satellite ==
- UPSat

== Partially open-source hardware ==
Hardware that uses closed source components

=== Computers ===
==== Single-board computers ====
- Tinkerforge RED Brick, executes user programs and controls other Bricks/Bricklets standalone

===== ARM =====
- Banana Pi, uses low-power processors with an ARM core; runs Linux, Android, and OpenWRT
- BeagleBoard, uses low-power Texas Instruments processors with an ARM Cortex-A8 core; runs Ångström distribution (Linux)
- IGEPv2, an ARM OMAP 3-based board designed and manufactured by ISEE in Spain. Its expansion boards are also open-source.
- OLinuXino, designed with KiCad by OLIMEX Ltd in Bulgaria
- PandaBoard, a variation of the BeagleBoard
- Rascal, an ARM based Linux board that works with Arduino shields, with a web server that includes an editor for users to program it in Python. Hardware design files released under the Creative Commons BY-SA license.
- 96Boards (includes but not limited to, DragonBoard 410c, HiKey, HiKey960, Bubblegum-96 and more...)
- Parallella single-board computer with a manycore coprocessor and field-programmable gate array (FPGA)

===== ATMega =====
- Arduino – open-source microcontroller board

==== Desktop computers ====
- Thelio – Desktop computers manufactured in the US by System76

===== Motorola 68000 series =====
- Minimig – a re-implementation of an Amiga 500 using a field-programmable gate array (FPGA).

===== National Semiconductor NS320xx series =====
- PC532, a personal computer design released in 1990, based on the NS32532 microprocessor

===== RISC-V =====
- HiFive1 is an Arduino-compatible development kit featuring the Freedom E310, the industry's first commercially available RISC-V SoC
- HiFive Unleashed is a Linux development platform for SiFive’s Freedom U540 SoC, the world’s first 4+1 64-bit multi-core Linux-capable RISC-V SoC."

==== Notebook computers ====
- Novena, a notebook computer that uses a 1.2 GHz quad-core Freescale processor closely coupled with a Xilinx FPGA
- VIA OpenBook, a netbook case design released by VIA Technologies

==== Handhelds, palmtops, and smartphones ====
- Ben NanoNote, a palmtop PC based on the MIPS architecture
- Openmoko, a smartphone containing a single-board computer equipped with a GSM/UMTS modem
- Simputer, a handheld computer released in 2002
- uConsole, a handheld computer kit supporting Raspberry Pi and RISC-V modules

== Related ==
=== Instruction sets ===
- J-Core, an implementation of the SuperH with some extensions
- MIPS
- Power, which originated from IBM's POWER ISA
- RISC-V, a RISC ISA that originated in 2010 at the University of California, Berkeley
- SPARC

=== Organisations ===
- Bug Labs, a US technology company that began by developing and selling open-source hardware peripherals for rapid prototyping of electronics
- LowRISC, a not-for-profit organization that aims to develop open hardware
- M-Labs, developers of the Milkymist system on a chip
- Open Compute Project, an organization for sharing designs of data center products among companies
- Open Graphics Project, a project that aims to design a standard open architecture for graphics cards
- OpenCores, a loose community of designers that supports open-source cores (logic designs) for CPUs, peripherals and other devices. OpenCores maintains an open-source on-chip interconnection bus specification called Wishbone
- OpenRISC is a group of developers working to produce a very-high-performance open-source RISC CPU.

== See also ==
- Open-Source Lab: How to Build Your Own Hardware and Reduce Research Costs (2014)
- Thingiverse, open-source designs of objects, many of which are 3D-printable
- Open-source hardware
- List of open-source first-person shooters
- List of open-source mobile phones
- List of open-source video games
- Open-source robotics
- Modular smartphone
- Open Source Ecology
- Preferred metric sizes
- Telecom Infra Project
