= Plaice (disambiguation) =

Plaice is the common name of four species of flatfishes.

Plaice or PLAICE may also refer to:

- USS Plaice (SS-390), a Balao-class submarine
- PLAICE, an open source hardware FLASH programmer, memory emulator, and logic analyzer
- Plaice Island
- Stephen Plaice (born 1951)

== See also ==
- Place (disambiguation)
- Plac (disambiguation)
