= David Wendell Phillips =

American lawyer (born 1962)

- Born: November 21, 1962 (age 63); Alexandria, Virginia
- Education: Pomona College; University of Chicago Law School
- Employer: Focus@Will

David Wendell Phillips (born November 21, 1962) is an American lawyer, businessman and investor. He is an angel investor in Silicon Valley, an experienced Internet executive, entrepreneur, and attorney.

== Educational background ==
David W. Phillips graduated from the Lawrenceville School in Lawrenceville, New Jersey in 1981. He attended Pomona College, where he graduated with a Bachelor of Arts in History in 1985. In 1988, he received his J.D. from the University of Chicago Law School.

== Early legal career ==
Phillips' career in law started in 1988 at Hogan & Hartson (now Hogan Lovells) in Washington, D.C. In 1991, he served as a Corporate Counsel and Business Development Attorney at ComTech Systems. In 1993, he joined the law firm of Cameron & Hornbostel in Washington, D.C., specializing in international trade and technology law.

== Tech career ==
In 1994, Phillips began his career in the growing internet field, when he joined America Online as its second lawyer. There he delved deeply into emerging web issues ranging from data privacy and copyright to first amendment issues.

In 1997, he moved to London to join AOL's joint venture with German Media Conglomerate, Bertelsmann AG. He served first as AOL UK General Counsel, then becoming the General Counsel of AOL Europe, reporting to Heinz Wermellinger in Zug Switzerland. After AOL and Bertelsmann AG acquired CompuServe and Netscape in Europe, Phillips transitioned to a business general management role as managing director of AOL UK.

Phillips left AOL in January 2000 to become CEO of UK digital music pioneer Crunch Music (acquired by Music Choice PLC in 2001).

In 2002 he served as a senior executive at Napster.

From 2005 to 2006, he served as the executive vice president of Corporate Development and general counsel at IGN Entertainment. During his tenure as EVP, he helped IGN acquire and integrate five digital entertainment companies and execute IGN's sale to News Corp in 2005 for $650 million.

In 2006, Phillips left IGN to become the founder and CEO of NaturalPath Media, which became the largest green ad network in the US (comScore), and was acquired by Six Apart in 2009 (now SAY Media).

Since 2010, he has been an active angel investor and advisor in the Silicon Valley startup community, where he has invested between $10,000 and $50,000 per investment deal. Notable investments include Motion Math, Massive Health, Talkable, Postling, Ekso Bionics, Say Media, Onfleet, Rock Health V5 Fund, Haystack News, Shuddle, SONR Labs, and FocusAtWill.

Phillips joined Joe Born in 2011 to found Hale Devices (previously called Sonr Labs, Inc.), a provider of Android audio peripherals. He served as the company’s first CEO, and now serves on the board of the company that now does business as AIWA US.

Between 2012 and 2014, Phillips served as SideCar Technologies's executive vice president for Policy and general counsel. In 2017, he joined Directly Software Inc. as Head of Corporate Development.

== Awards and recognition ==
- The Pomona College George S. Burgess Award in Constitutional Law, awarded to the student earning the highest grade in constitutional law
- Rotary Club Professional Fellowship to Brazil in 1991
- American Bar Association, chairman, Cyberspace Committee January 1995 – November 1996

== Published works ==
- "Recommendations for the Evolution of Netlaw: Protecting Privacy in a Digital Age" (1996), Journal of Computer-Mediated Communication
- Web-Linking Agreements: Contracting Strategies and Model Provisions (1997)
- Riding Giants: Surfing the next great waves of the Internet - Silicon Valley comes to Oxford 2013
