= WhereverTV =

- Type: Public
- Traded as: OTCID Basic Current: TVTV
- Industry: Digital television
- Founded: July 16, 2006 (as WhereverTV, Inc.)
- Founder: Mark Cavicchia
- Headquarters: Fort Myers, Florida, United States
- Area served: Most places
- Key people: Edward D. Ciofani (Chairman & CEO)
- Products: Internet television; Pay television; Pay-per-view
- Subsidiaries: WhereverTV, Inc.
- Website: wherever.tv

WhereverTV is an Over-the-top (OTT) internet television platform provider located in Fort Myers, Florida. The company delivers linear television programming to SmartTVs, digital media receivers, and mobile devices via the public internet.

The company has been providing access to free live-streaming TV channels over the internet since 2007 through its Global Interactive Program Guide internet TV software, allowing registered users to watch TV online. In 2011, the company began selling subscription services for live television from Morocco and Greece. In 2013, it began selling Arabic TV subscriptions. WhereverTV announced plans to launch two additional services for 2013: a software application aimed at managing US and international channels on portable and stationary internet-connected devices, and a traditional US-based subscription service.

WhereverTV was created as an alternative to fixed location subscription services such as those offered by cable companies and satellite television providers. Subscribers can personalize their viewing choices and subscription services. The company provides both wireless television and hard-wired access to TV over the internet.

== History ==
The concept for what was to become WhereverTV was created by Mark Cavicchia while he was living in Shanghai, China, after becoming frustrated with the complexities of trying to stream the 2005 NCAA Men's Division I Basketball Championship tournament live on AOL. He decided to create a portable channel guide that would work across devices and geographies and allow users to organize and watch TV online anywhere in the world. Upon returning to the United States in 2006, he wrote the patent application for WhereverTV's core technology.

To promote its Global Interactive Programme Guide concept, the Company wrote its own firmware to run on the popular open-source Neuros OSD hardware that was white-labeled and renamed The WhereverTV Receiver. The first public demonstration of the WhereverTV receiver was made on July 9, 2008, at the Consumer Electronics Association's 2008 SINOCES trade show in Qingdao, China. Subsequently, the WhereverTV Receiver debuted at the 2009 International CES trade show in Las Vegas, Nevada, where it was covered by media outlets around the world, including the US, Poland, Israel, Brazil, and the Middle East.

== Recognition ==
WhereverTV was named to 2010 Always-on's On-Media 100, the Top 100 Private Companies that are pioneering the next generation advertising and marketing Internet services. The WhereverTV Receiver was named one of the 30 Most Innovative Products at the 2009 Consumer Electronics Show. WhereverTV's CEO was also invited to testify at a Federal Communications Commission hearing on Broadband and the Digital Future.

== See also ==
- TV Everywhere
- Web television
- Over-the-top content
- Multi-screen video
- IPTV
