= Mackerel Island =

Island in Graham Land, Antarctica

Mackerel Island (66°1′S 65°26′W) is an island immediately west of Flounder Island in the Fish Islands, off the west coast of Graham Land, Antarctica. It was charted by the British Graham Land Expedition under John Rymill, 1934–37, and was so named by the UK Antarctic Place-Names Committee in 1959 after the mackerel as it is one of the Fish Islands.

== See also ==
- List of Antarctic and sub-Antarctic islands
