= The Minnows =

The Minnows (66°1′S 65°23′W) are a group of small islands and rocks lying east of Flounder Island in the Fish Islands, off the west coast of Graham Land, Antarctica. They were charted by the British Graham Land Expedition under John Rymill, 1934–37, and were so named by the UK Antarctic Place-Names Committee in 1959 because the group lies in the Fish Islands, and "minnow" is a term for a small fish.
