= Telecom Infra Project =

Organization that shares telecom technologies and best practices

- Formation: February 2016
- Type: 501(c)(6) non-profit
- Tax ID no.: 81-1395224
- Purpose: Collaborative telecom technologies community for design, build and implementation
- Location: Wakefield, Massachusetts
- Members: T-Mobile, Broadcom, Bell Canada, SK Telecom, Hewlett Packard Enterprise, + 500 others
- Board of directors: Intel, Facebook, Nokia, Deutsche Telekom, Vodafone, Telefonica, BT Group
- Website: telecominfraproject.com

The Telecom Infra Project (TIP) was formed in 2016 as an engineering-focused, collaborative methodology for building and deploying global telecom network infrastructure, with the goal of enabling global access for all.

TIP is jointly steered by its group of founding tech and telecom companies, which forms its board of directors, and is chaired by Vodafone's Head of Network Strategy and Architecture, Yago Tenorio. Member companies host technology incubator labs and accelerators, and TIP hosts an annual infrastructure conference, TIP Summit. Which was renamed to FYUZ and hosted in Madrid in October 2022.

The organization adopts transparency of process and collaboration in the development of new technologies, by its more than 500 participating member organizations, including operators, suppliers, developers, integrators, startups and other entities, that participate in various TIP project groups. Projects employ current case studies to evolve telecom equipment and software into more flexible, agile, and interoperable forms.

== Projects and project groups ==
With telecom technology disaggregated into Access, Backhaul, and Core & Management, each project group focused on one of these three specific network areas. Past and present projects include, among others:

- OpenRAN — enabling open ecosystem of GPP-based RAN solutions, chaired by Andrew Dunkin (Vodafone) and Adnan Boustany (Intel).
- Millimeter Wave (mmWave) Networks — creating low-cost hardware and software tools, and best practices, to streamline municipal mmWave networks, chaired by Salil Sawhney (Facebook) and Andreas Gladisch (Deutsche Telekom).
- Power and Connectivity — global connectivity through global electricity, chaired by Cesar Hernandex Perez and Jamie Yang.
- System Integration and Site Optimization — system integration and cost-analysis, chaired by Dr. Sanket Nesargi and Emre Tepedelenlioglu.
- Solutions Integration — development of an interoperable RAN architecture, chaired by Dr. G. Wan Choi.
- Open Optical & Packet Transport — designing interoperable solutions for packet and optical networks, chaired by Hans-Juergen Schmidtke (Facebook) and Victor Lopez (Telefónica). The DWDM Voyager packet/optical transponder, developed and tested live by member companies Facebook and Vodafone, respectively, is the first white box transponder and routing device for open packet/optical networks. The first router design developed by the group is the Disaggregated Cell Site Gateway. It was designed by Vodafone, Telefonica and TIM Brasil. Telefonica will deploy the first units in 2020.
- Open Converged Wireless project group, developing OpenWiFi, OpenOFDM.

== Community Labs ==
Various TIP member companies provide dedicated space for its project groups as "TIP Community Labs," facilitating collaborative projects between member companies in the development of telecom infrastructure. As of 2020, TIP has 14 labs throughout 8 countries around the world including, Spain, Italy, USA, Indonesia, UK, Japan, Germany, and Brazil.

== TIP Ecosystem Acceleration Centers ==
TIP Ecosystem Acceleration Centers (TEACs) are global technology innovation centers sponsored by one or more member organizations that connect startups to venture capitalists. TEACs are hosted in Seoul, Berlin, Paris and the UK.

== See also ==
- Open Compute Project (OCP)
- Geostationary balloon satellite
- High-altitude platform station
- Internet.org
- List of open-source hardware projects
- Open-source computing hardware
- Optical
- broadband networks
- cellular network
