= PineTab =

Tablet intended for open-source software

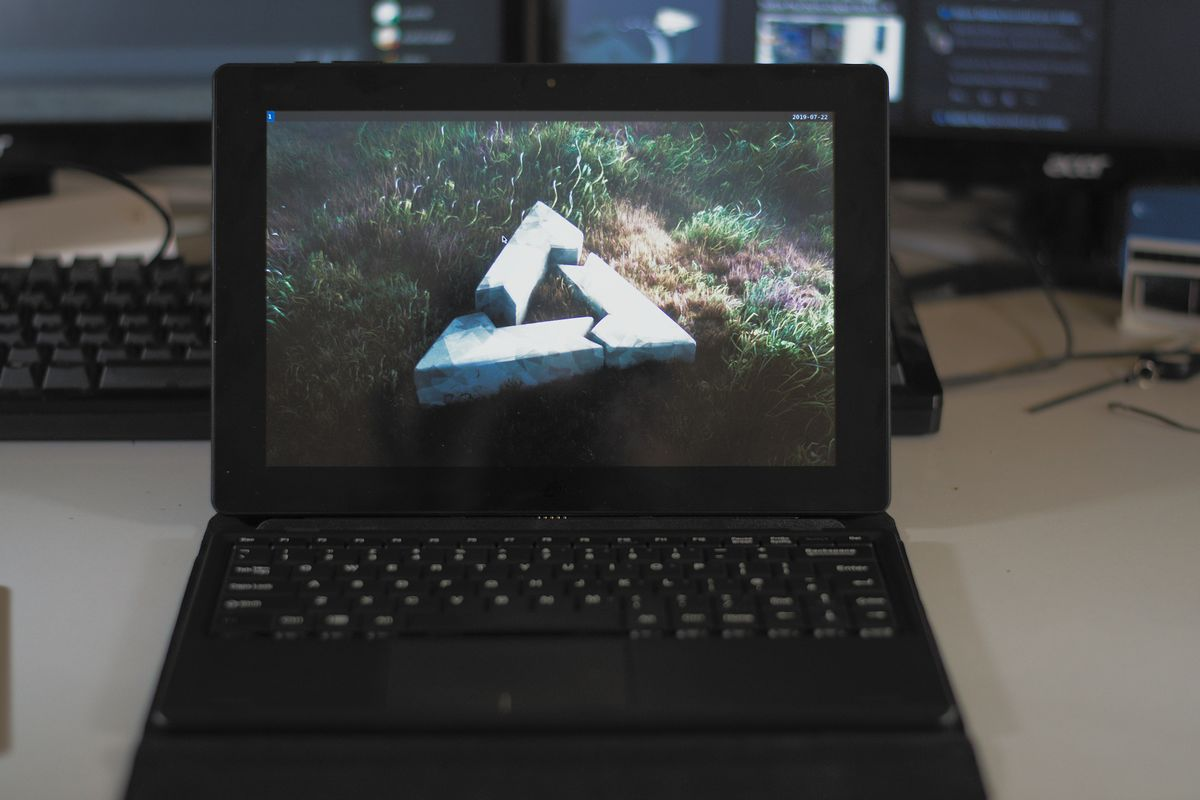
- PineTab with the optional keyboard attached, running postmarketOS
- Manufacturer: Pine64
- Released: May 2020; 6 years ago
- Operating system: Linux
- CPU: Allwinner A64 ARM Quad core Cortex-A53, 64bit @ max 1.2GHz
- Memory: 2 GB LPDDR3
- Storage: 64GB eMMC flash memory
- Removable storage: microSD (bootable), optional M.2
- Display: 1280×800 10" IPS LCD
- Graphics: Mali-400 MP2
- Camera: Front: Single GC2035, 2MP, f/2.8, 1/5″ Rear: Single Omnivision 6540, 5MPx, 1/4″, LED Flash
- Connectivity: Wi-Fi 802.11 b/g/n, single-band, hotspot capable, Bluetooth 4.0, A2DP, 3.5mm headphone jack, USB 2.0, micro USB 2.0 OTG, HD Video Out (Mini-HDMI)
- Power: 6000mAh
- Dimensions: PineTab: 258 mm × 170 mm × 11.2 mm (10.16 in × 6.69 in × 0.44 in); With detachable keyboard: 262 mm × 180 mm × 21.1 mm (10.31 in × 7.09 in × 0.83 in)
- Weight: PineTab: 575 g (20.3 oz); With detachable keyboard: 950 g (34 oz)
- Successor: PineTab 2

The PineTab is a low-cost tablet computer developed by Hong Kong–based computer manufacturer Pine64. The PineTab was announced in May 2020, with shipping beginning in September 2020. It is based on the platform of the existing Pine A64 single board computer, with the platform being used in related devices, such as the Pinebook and PinePhone.

== History and editions ==
In May 2020, Pine64 announced the PineTab tablet at a starting price of $99, alongside an optional detachable backlit keyboard. Pre-orders began shortly after the announcement. Devices were first shipped to developers and early adopters, though shipping was delayed until September 2020 for consumers. It then later experienced shipping delays and shortages for components due to the COVID-19 pandemic, which made Pine64 decide to allocate more resources for the then-released PinePhone, creating varying availability.

In December 2022, Pine64 announced a successor to the original device, dubbed the "PineTab 2". PineTab2 is expected to not face the same Supply chain issues as the first generation tab.

== Hardware ==
The PineTab uses an Allwinner A64 SoC, which has four Cortex-A53 cores clocked at 1.152 GHz, alongside a Mali-400 MP2 GPU, together with 2 GB LPDDR3 of RAM and a 6000mAh battery. It has 64 GB of eMMC flash memory, alongside a M.2 slot for optional expansion with a solid-state drive or cellular modem. Storage capacity can also be expanded with a microSD, which is bootable.

It supports Wi-Fi 802.11b/g/n and Bluetooth 4.0, has one USB 2.0 port, a micro USB 2.0 port with OTG, Mini-HDMI for external display output and a 3.5mm headphone jack. The device also contains stereo speakers, a 5 MP rear camera and a 2 MP front facing camera. The display is a 10" IPS LCD with a resolution of 1280 × 800. It weighs 575 grams (1.3 pounds).

== Software ==
The PineTab aims to be an open platform for the development of free and open source software for Linux on mobile devices. Operating systems include Ubuntu Touch, postmarketOS, Mobian (Debian ARM) and Arch Linux ARM.

== See also ==
- Pine64
- Pinebook
- PinePhone
- Linux for mobile devices
