= Joe Born =

American businessman

- Born: May 17, 1969 (age 57)
- Occupations: CEO, Aiwa.
- Website: www.aiwa.us.com

Joseph Born (born May 5, 1969), better known as Joe Born, is an American inventor and businessman. As CEO of Aiwa and previously Neuros Technology and contributing inventor to many of its products, Joe Born has advocated on behalf of open source hardware, digital rights, and generally on the subject of the global maker movement, and open source.

== Professional accomplishments ==
In 1995, after receiving a patent for a CD repair device, later named the SkipDoctor, Joe Born founded Digital Innovations, LLC. With an original investment of $15,000, the company was created to commercialize the skipdoctor invention. Joined in 1996 by Collin Anderson, they brought the invention to market in 1999, and, as of December 2013, had sold 10 million units of the SkipDoctor globally.

In September 2001, the Neuros division was started within Digital Innovations to develop open digital media products. In December 2003, Neuros was spun off into a separate entity, Neuros Technology, LLC. Influenced by its developer community, Joe Born, as Chief of Neuros, has become a pioneer in the field of open source hardware, helping to influence many of its partners to become more open, including successfully lobbying Texas Instruments to release a free compiler for a previously closed Digital Signal Processor

In March 2011, Joe Born and David W. Phillips founded Hale Devices (previously called Sonr Labs, Inc,) as a provider of Android audio peripherals.

After helping to bring his then 10-year-old daughter, Lily Born's Kangaroo Cup invention to market in October 2012, Born has become an advocate for young inventors including advising the SEE/Dig-8 program at Nettlehorst Elementary School, a program created to teach product development and entrepreneurship to middle school students

Speaking engagements are typically focused on student entrepreneurship, open source and the maker movement and include: Ohio Linux Fest, LinuxWorld, LugRadioLive, Various Linux User Groups & University of Chicago China Immersion program and Kellogg's Masters of Management in Manufacturing Program.

In addition to consumer electronics, Born has also received patents in areas ranging from internal combustion engine components to cosmetic accessories.
