= Multiplo =

Multiplo is a robotics building system based on an open source philosophy that allows users to design and create high technology devices. It is currently being used as teaching material for schools and by enthusiasts of robotics.

They have been awarded in Argentina the "INNOVAR" prize, as one of the most innovative products.

Multiplo is organized in platforms. A platform is a set of a system’s modules created to work around, and solve, common robotics problems.

Multiplo is the sum of four components. Each one has the same importance, maintaining a common philosophy, aesthetic, and feel from the user’s point of view.

1. Electronics: compatible with Arduino
2. Software: besides Arduino, it is compatible with the Open Source graphical IDE miniBloq
3. Mechanics: based on ABS, acrylic and other materials easily customizable by being FabLab-compatible
4. Documentation: released in Open Source formats like LibreOffice

Multiplo robots are being exhibited in California at The Tech Museum. Its concept was originally designed by Julian da Silva and some collaborators, later adopted by the company. It was finally crowdfunded through a crowdfunding campaign after being transformed into a robot kit by Rodolfo Cossovich.
