= Bug Labs =

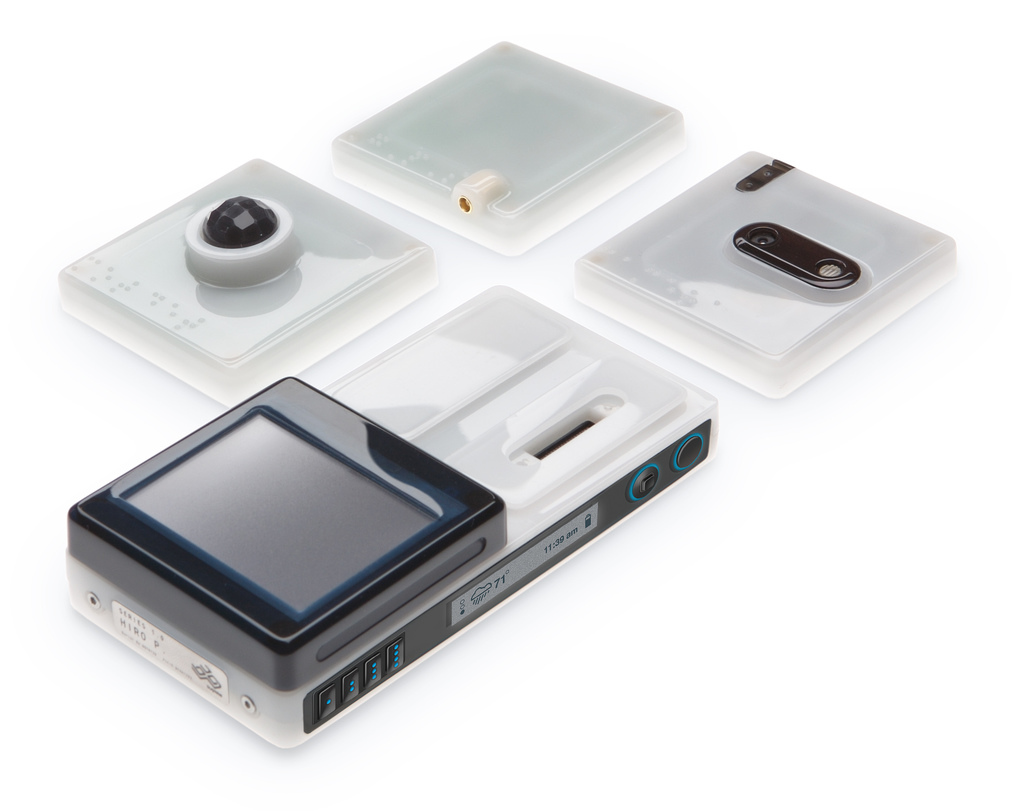
Bug Labs open source hardware modules

Bug Labs is a technology company headquartered in New York City that began by developing and selling open-source hardware peripherals for rapid prototyping of electronic devices. The company, founded in April 2006, developed a Lego-like hardware platform that technology enthusiasts, hobbyists and engineers used to create their own digital devices. The company develops software and firmware in order to connect devices to the internet, and has partnerships with several Fortune 100 companies, including mobile phone operators.

Bug Labs has produced data sharing utility for the Internet of Things called dweet.io. dweet.io is a messaging service for devices. It requires no setup or sign in, sending data from a home device to the cloud by "dweeting" it with a HAPI-REST web API. dweet.io can be experimented with using their API console.

To coincide with dweet.io, Bug Labs next released a visualization tool called Freeboard. The purpose of this tool is similar to dweet.io; to make it simple to connect devices and view the data they provide. Users can connect HTTP, JSON, or a dweet-connected device to the tool and view real-time data in seconds.
