= MakerPlane =

MakerPlane is an open source aviation organization, started by a group of Canadian plane building enthusiasts. Its members are designing the first open source airplane, which they estimate could cost about US$15,000 to build.

Many do-it-yourself aircraft projects are abandoned before they are completed due to complex plans and vague assembly instructions. A lack of builder support, the thousands of hours needed to create a complete plane and manufacturers of parts and plans going out of business also pose a risk. To combat these obstacles, MakerPlane members aim to maintain an active network, sharing information and working together on a simple and economical plane design, and make some of their own parts.

== Aircraft designs ==
In 2011 the MakerPlane community began designing their aircraft from the ground up to be built using modern and affordable personal manufacturing equipment, such as CNC mills and 3D Printers. The first design is a 2-seat Light Sport Aircraft, currently under the working name of "MakerPlane v1.0 LSA". The designs are to be released under a Creative Commons license. The first prototype was expected to be flown in 2015 and shown at the AirVenture OshKosh shows in 2014 and 2015

== Events ==
In 2013, MakerPlane initiated a Kickstarter campaign and an Indiegogo campaign to fund development of its plane. During the first few months, these campaigns did not succeed in raising a significant amount of money.

In January, 2014, MakerPlane successfully flew its first scale model.

In June 2019, after 5 years with no news, the project exhibited at AirVenture.

== See also ==
- Electric airplane
