= Open Prosthetics Project =

- Website: openprosthetics.org

The Open Prosthetics Project (OPP) is an open design effort, dedicated to public domain prosthetics.

By creating an online collaboration between prosthetic users and designers, the project aims to make new technology available for anyone to use and customize. On the project's website, medical product designers can post new ideas for prosthetic devices as CAD files, which are then available to the public free of charge. Prosthetic users or other designers can download the Computer-aided design (CAD) data, customize or improve upon the prosthesis, and repost the modifications to the web site. Users are free to take 3D models to a fabricator and have the hardware built for less cost than buying a manufactured limb.

The project was started by Jonathon Kuniholm, a member of United States Marine Corps Reserve who lost part of his right arm to an improvised explosive device (IED) in Iraq. Upon returning home and receiving his first myoelectric hand, he decided there must be a better solution.
