= Focus@Will =

- Founded: 2012
- Founder: Will Henshall, John Vitale
- Headquarters: Los Angeles, California, United States
- Website: focusatwill.com

Focus@Will is a subscription service that offers sequenced playlists of instrumental music marketed for listener's productivity improvement. The company is based out of Los Angeles.

== Service ==
All of the music available at Focus@Will is instrumental, separated into a number of different channels, including classical, up tempo, focus spa, cinematic, and ambient.

The app offers a personalized feed that take into account the skipped tracks. The service also includes a timer function and a productivity tracker.

The company showcased a white paper describing the benefits of its style of music, but it was not peer-reviewed. Jack Curtis Dubowsky, a composer, described this as "flimsy pseudo-science" and compared it to Muzak, which claimed in a report in 1956 that it increased worker productivity.

== History ==
Founder and CEO Will Henshall was previously a professional musician, who then founded a company that created online collaboration tools for musicians, sold to Avid Audio in 2003. He cofounded Focus@Will with John Vitale and Graham Lyus.

The beta version of Focus@Will was released in December 2012.

Beginning in April 2013 the company expanded the service to international markets. The expanded service incorporated a timer for users to set work session intervals, and a productivity tracking function to measure efficiency and focus.

A Focus@will mobile app and freemium service were released in May 2013.

The company is backed by the Pritzker Foundation, other private investors, and Singularity University. As of February 2013, it had raised approximately $3.5 million.
