= IOIO =

Microcontroller board for Android applications

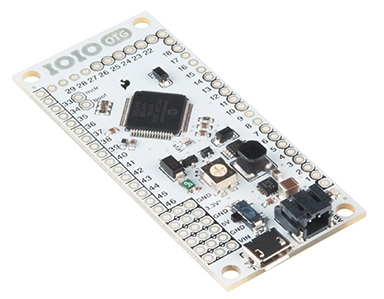
- IOIO-OTG Board, with its trademark "all white" PCB
- Released: April 2011; 15 years ago
- Introductory price: $39.95 (IOIO-OTG)
- CPU: Microchip PIC24FJ256
- Connectivity: Host : USB/USB-OTG, Bluetooth; I/O : GPIO, PWM, I2C, SPI, UART, Input capture, Capacitive sensing
- Website: github.com/ytai/ioio/

IOIO (pronounced yo-yo) is a series of open source PIC microcontroller-based boards that allow Android mobile applications to interact with external electronics. The device was invented by Ytai Ben-Tsvi in 2011, and was first manufactured by SparkFun Electronics. The name "IOIO" is inspired by the function of the device, which enables applications to receive external input ("I") and produce external output ("O").

== Features ==
The IOIO board contains a single PIC MCU that acts as a USB host/USB slave and communicates with an Android app running on a connected Android device. The board provides connectivity via USB, USB-OTG or Bluetooth, and is controllable from within an Android application using the Java API.

In addition to basic digital input/output and analog input, the IOIO library also handles PWM, I2C, SPI, UART, Input capture, Capacitive sensing and advanced motor control. To connect to older Android devices that use USB 2.0 in slave mode, newer IOIO models use USB On-The-Go to act as a host for such devices. Some models also support the Google Open Accessory USB protocol.

The IOIO motor control API can drive up to 9 motors and any number of binary actuators in synchronization and cycle-accurate precision. Developers may send a sequence of high-level commands to the IOIO, which performs the low-level waveform generation on-chip. The IOIO firmware supports 3 different kinds of motors; stepper motors, DC motors and servo motors.

Device firmware may be updated on-site by the user. For first-generation devices updating is performed using an Android device and the IOIO Manager application available on Google Play. Second-generation IOIO-OTG devices must be updated using a desktop computer running the IOIODude application.

The IOIO supports both computers and Android devices as first-class hosts, and provides the exact API on both types of devices. First-generation devices can only communicate with PCs over Bluetooth, while IOIO-OTG devices can use either Bluetooth or USB. PC applications may use APIs for Java or C# to communicate with the board; Java being the official API.

== Applications ==
The IOIO hardware and software is entirely open source, and enabled the creation of hundreds of DIY robotic projects around the world.

The board has been featured in various learning kits, which aim to help students write Android applications that can interact with the external world.

The Qualcomm Snapdragon Micro Rover is a 3D printed robot that leverages an Android smartphone and the IOIO to control the robot's motors and sensors. A team led by Israeli inventor Dr. Guy Hoffman created an emotionally-sensitive robot, that relies on the IOIO to control the robot's hardware.

== Reviews ==
The IOIO has been variously described as a "geek's paradise", "an easy way to get I/O from an Android device’s USB connection" and "a USB I/O breakout board for Android smartphones which turns your handset into a super-Arduino of sorts". It featured as a recommended "gift for geeks" in a Scientific Computing article.

According to SlashGear, an online electronics magazine:

You could hook up the IOIO for Android and a couple of heat sensors, and whip up an app that measures room temperature and then emails you if it’s getting too hot. Thanks to a range of I/O choices – including Digital Input/Output, PWM, Analog Input, I2C, SPI and UART control – you could also connect your home thermostat to automatically adjust the heating in response.

— Chris Davies, "IOIO for Android gets video demos: Geek’s paradise!", SlashGear

According to SparkFun, the first manufacturer of the device:

You can combine the awesome computing power, Internet/Bluetooth connectivity, touch screen, and a variety of sensors from your Android device with the ability to easily add peripheral devices to interact with the outside world. Also, using the IOIO does not require any hardware or software modifications to your Android device, thus preserving the warranty as well as making the functionality available to non-hackers.

— Publishing Team, "IOIO Android Interface Board Retail", SparkFun

According to Ytai Ben-Tsvi, the inventor of the device:

Android phones are powerful mobile computers having internet connectivity and a rich variety of built-in sensors (camera, GPS, IMU, touch screen). They are also very easy to write applications for, thanks to the great work done by the Android SDK developers. For many applications, all they are really missing is connectivity to external peripherals. This is exactly where IOIO fits in: it enriches the inherent capabilities of the Android device with the ability to communicate with external circuits.

— Ytai Ben-Tsvi, "Meet IOIO - I/O for Android"

== Technical details ==
=== IOIO V1 ===
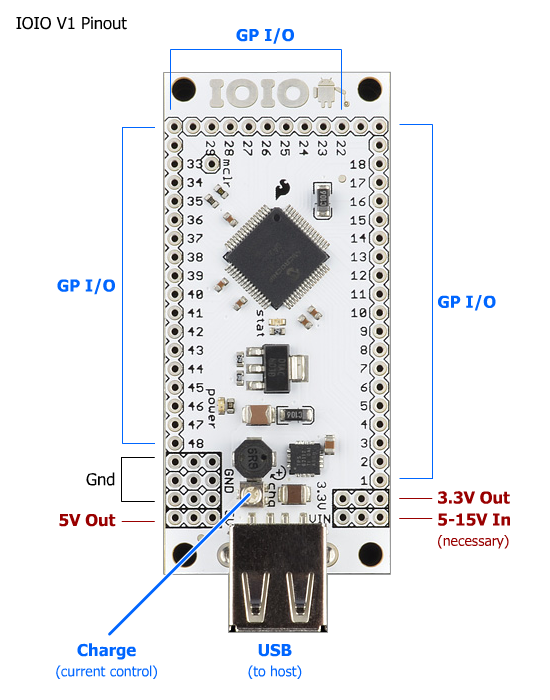
First-generation IOIO pinout/connection diagram

The first-generation IOIO boards (known as IOIO V1) contain the following on-board features: This generation only supports USB slave mode, and requires a USB master as the host (PC or newer Android phones).

The IOIO V1 is a 3.3 V logic level device, and features a 5 V DC/DC switching regulator and a 3.3V linear regulator. The 5 V regulator supports a 5–15 V input range and up to 1.5 A load. This facilitates charging a connected Android device as well as driving several small motors or similar loads.

Feature	Details	Description
USB connector	type A, female	Used to connect to the Android device.
GND pins	9 pins	Ground connection.
VIN pins	3 pins	Used for power supply to the board. Voltage between 5 and 15 V should be supplied.
5 V pins	3 pins	Normally used as 5 V output to user electronics, when the board is powered from VIN. Can be used as 5V input in case VIN is not connected.
3.3 V pins	3 pins	3.3 V output to user electronics.
I/O pins	48 pins	General purpose I/O pins. Some have special functions, such as ADC, Input Capture, UART, PWM, Comparator or for programming the PIC MCU (ICSP).
Power LED		Lights when the IOIO is getting power.
Stat LED		Lights briefly during power-up and then becomes under application control.
MCLR pin		Not normally used. Its purpose is for programming new bootloader firmware on the IOIO board.
Charge current trimmer (CHG)		Adjusts the amount of charge current supplied on the VBUS line of the USB to the Android device. Turning in the (+) direction increases charge current.

=== IOIO OTG ===
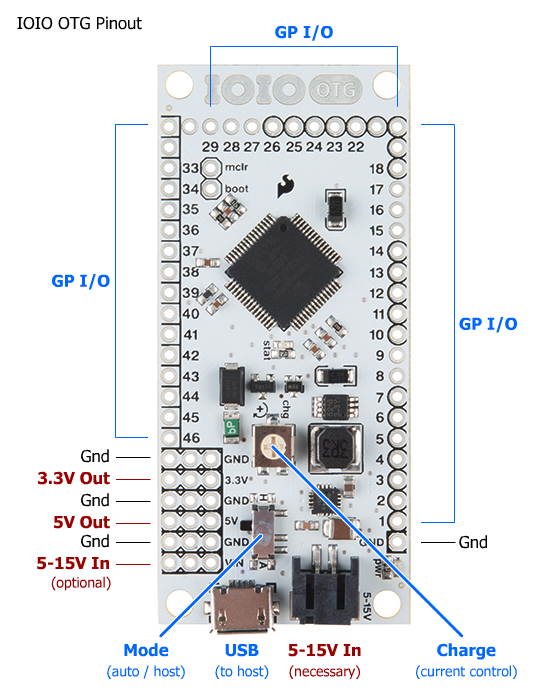
IOIO-OTG pinout/connection diagram

The second-generation IOIO boards (known as IOIO-OTG) contain the following on-board features: As the name suggests, a key feature of this generation is the introduction of USB-OTG, supporting USB master or slave mode. This enables the IOIO to connect to older Android phones that only support USB slave mode, in addition.

The IOIO-OTG is a 3.3 V logic level device, with some of the pins being 5 V tolerant. It features a 5 V DC/DC switching regulator and a 3.3 V linear regulator. The 5 V regulator supports a 5–15 V input range and up to 3 A load. This facilitates charging a connected Android device as well as driving several small motors or similar loads.

Feature	Details	Description
USB connector	micro-AB, female	Used to connect to host computer, an Android device or a Bluetooth dongle.
Power jack	2-pin JST, female	Used for power supply to the board. Voltage between 5–15 V should be supplied.
GND pins	10 pins	Ground connection.
VIN pins	3 pins	Used for outputting the supply voltage to your circuit, or as an alternative input to the power jack.
5V pins	3 pins	5V output from the on-board regulator, which can be used in your circuit.
3.3 V pins	3 pins	3.3 V from the on-board regulator, which can be used in your circuit.
I/O pins	46 pins	General purpose I/O pins. Some have special functions, such as ADC, Input Capture, UART, PWM, Comparator or for programming the PIC MCU (ICSP).
PWR LED	red	Lights when the IOIO is getting power.
STAT LED	yellow	General purpose on-board LED, under application control.
MCLR pin		Not normally used. Its purpose is for programming new bootloader firmware on the IOIO board.
BOOT pin		Special pin used for getting the IOIO into bootloader mode on power-up. Note that this pin is shared with the stat LED.
Charge current trimmer (CHG)		Adjusts the amount of current supplied on the VBUS line of the USB when acting as a USB host. Typically used in battery-powered application with Android to prevent the Android from draining the battery quickly. Turning in the (+) direction increases charge current.
Host switch		In "A" mode, the IOIO-OTG will detect whether it should act as host or as device automatically, according to whichever USB connector is plugged in (micro-A or micro-B). To support non-standard USB cables or adapters that use micro-B type, move the switch to the "H" position to force host mode.

== See also ==
- Arduino
- BeagleBoard
- Raspberry Pi
- PICkit
- Open-source robotics
- PIC microcontroller
