= HackRF One =

SDR half-duplex transceiver

HackRF One is a wide band software defined radio (SDR) half-duplex transceiver created and manufactured by Great Scott Gadgets. It is able to send and receive signals. Its principal designer, Michael Ossmann, launched a successful Kickstarter campaign in 2014 with a first run of the project called HackRF. The hardware and software's open source nature has attracted hackers, amateur radio enthusiasts, and information security practitioners.

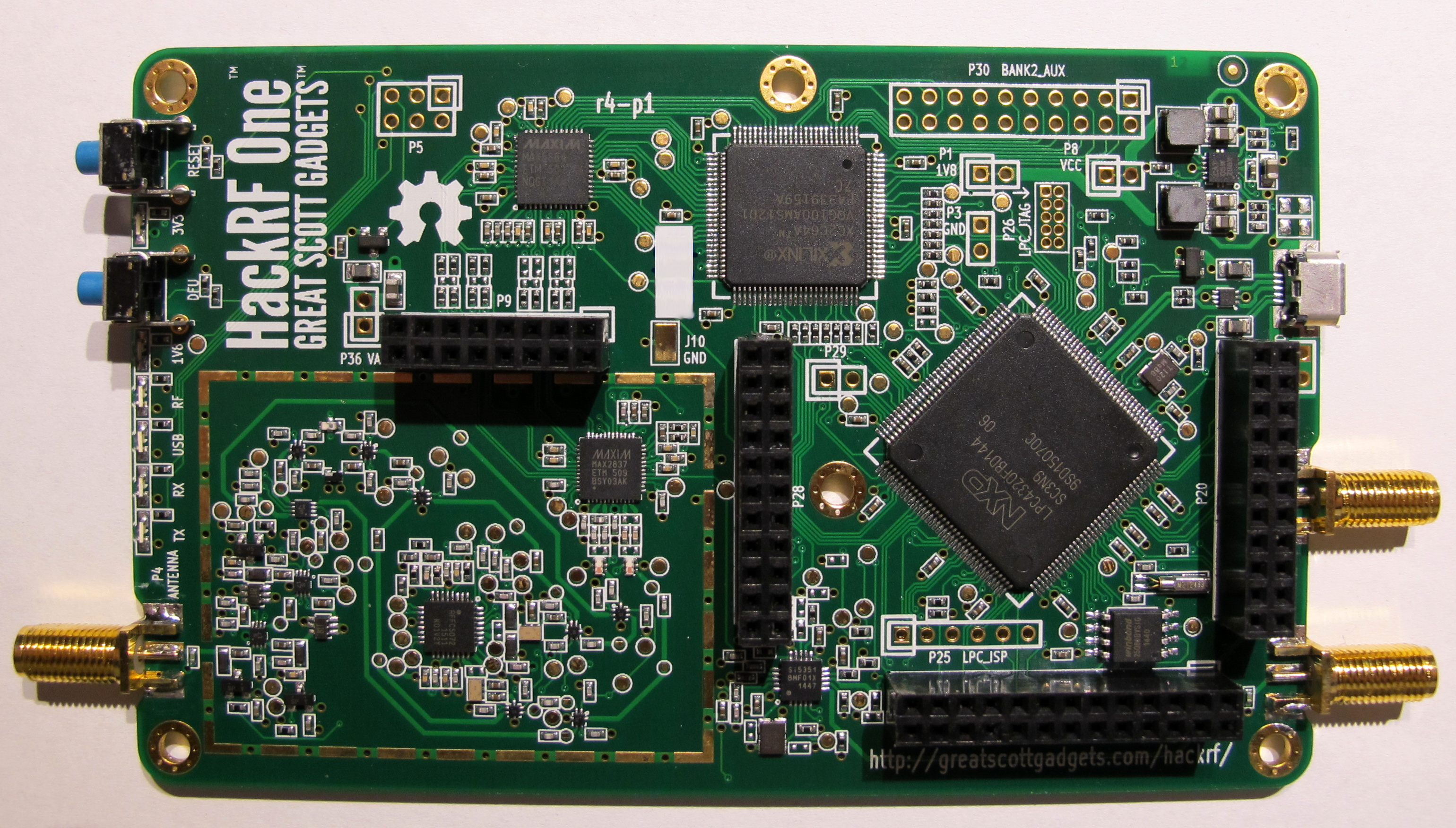
HackRF One PCB by Great Scott Gadgets

== Overview ==
HackRF One is capable of receiving and transmitting on a frequency range of 1 MHz to 6 GHz with maximum output power of up to 15 dBm depending on the band. The unit comes with an SMA antenna port, clock input and clock output SMA ports, and a USB 2.0 port. HackRF One integrates with popular software defined radio software such as GNU Radio and SDR#. The popularity of HackRF One as a security research platform has made it featured in many information security conference talks such as BlackHat, DEF CON and BSides.

== Academic research ==
Kimmo Heinäaro presented a paper at the 2015 International Conference on Military Communications and Information Systems (ICMCIS) outlining how military tactical communications could be hacked with HackRF One and other open source tools.

In 2017, researchers described a GPS spoofing attack to feed a vehicle false signals and mapping data to deliver the target to a desired location.

== Media attention ==
HackRF One has received criticism in several media reports because it can be used to intercept and replay the key fob signals to open car and garage doors.
