= PowWow =

Wireless sensor network mote

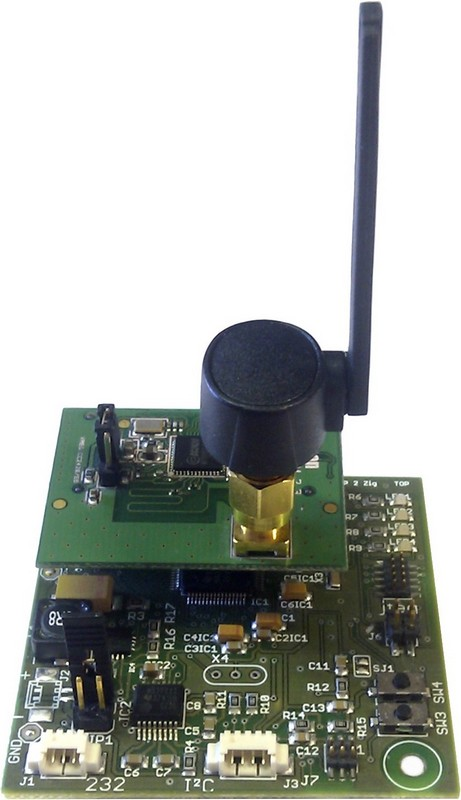
PowWow hardware platform

PowWow (Power Optimized Hardware and Software FrameWork for Wireless Motes) is a wireless sensor network (WSN) mote developed by the Cairn team of IRISA/INRIA. The platform is currently based on IEEE 802.15.4 standard radio transceiver and on an MSP430 microprocessor. Unlike other available mote systems, PowWow offers specific features for a very-high energy efficiency:

- the MAC layer is based on an asynchronous rendezvous scheme initiated by the receiver,
- architectural and circuit level optimizations were performed such as power management, frequency and voltage scaling and FPGA co-processing for low power,
- the software stack is very light (5 kbytes) uses event-driven programming and is currently derived from the Protothread library of Contiki.

== Hardware ==
PowWow hardware platform is composed of a motherboard including an MSP430 microcontroller and of other daughter boards such as the radio transceiver board, the coprocessing board and some sensor and energy harvester boards.

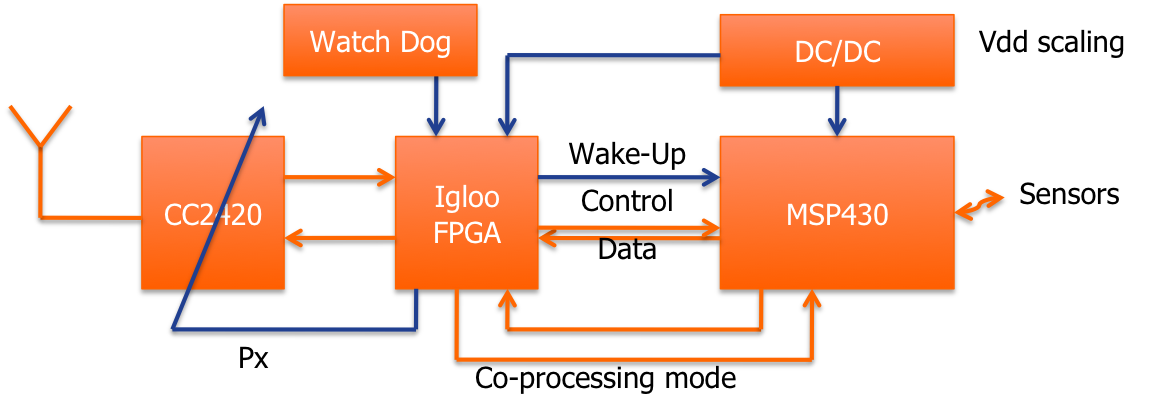

=== Processing motherboard ===
- TI MSP430 low-power microcontroller
- MSP430F1612 version, 8 MHz clock
- 55 KB of flash memory, 5 KB of on-chip RAM
- 330uA at 1 MHz and 2.2 V in active mode, 1.1uA in standby mode
- P1, P2 connectors for extension
- JTAG, RS232 and I2C interfaces

=== Radio Board ===
- TI CC2420 RF transceiver
  - Digital direct sequence spread spectrum baseband modem
  - Single-chip 2.4 GHz IEEE 802.15.4 compliant
  - Spreading gain of 9 dB, data rate of 250 kbit/s
- Hardware support for packet handling, data buffering, burst transmissions, data encryption, data authentication, clear channel assessment, link quality indication and packet timing information

=== Co-processing Board ===
A co-processing board can be added to the motherboard on P1, P2 connectors. This board provides dynamic voltage scaling and hardware acceleration to increase the energy efficiency of the network.

- Power Mode Management (PMM)
  - Low-Power Programmable Timer for Wake-up period
  - MAX6370, 8uA
- Dynamic Voltage and Frequency Scaling (DFVS)
  - Programmable Clock
    - LTC6930, 490uA
    - 8 MHz divided by 1 to 128
  - Programmable DC/DC converter
    - TPS62402/TPS61030
- FPGA co-processing
  - Low-power Igloo FPGA from Actel
  - AGL125: 130 nm, 125 kgates, 32 kbits on-chip RAM, 1 kbits Flash, PLL for clock management.
  - Supply voltages 0 to 1.65V
  - Power consumption: 2.2 uW, 16 uW, 1 to 30 mW in sleep, freeze, run modes
  - e.g. Viterbi decoder for link layer implemented on the FPGA consumes 5 mW

== Networking ==
- MAC layer: preamble sampling protocol

PowWow uses RICER protocol proposed by UC Berkeley to reduce the time spent in radio reception (RX) mode. This protocol consists in cycled rendez-vous initiated by a wake-up beacon from potential receivers. Thanks to this method, nodes are sleeping most of the time, hence saving energy.

- Multi-hop routing
- Geographical routing

PowWow uses a simple geographical routing protocol.

  - Each node has (x,y) coordinates
  - Next node for hop transmission is chosen in the neighbors as the nearest to the destination

in the sense of Euclidean distance

- Neighbor table management
  - A neighbor is a node in the radio range of a node
  - Neighbors are discovered at power-up and on regular time period
- Transmission modes
  - Broadcast
    - Direct transmission to {neighbors}, no ACK
  - Flooding
    - Broadcast a packet to all network nodes, no ACK
  - Direct Hop with/without ACK
    - Direct transmission to a specific neighbors with/without ACK
  - Robust Multi-Hop
    - Multi-hop transmission to a specific node in the network
    - Each hop is with ACK
    - Uses node address

== Software ==
PowWow software distribution provides an API organized into protocol layers (PHY, MAC, LINK, NET and APP). The software is based on the protothread library of Contiki, which provides a sequential control flow without complex state machines or full multi-threading.

- Memory efficiency: 6 Kbytes (protocol layers) + 5 Kbytes (application)
- Over-the-air re-programmation (and soon reconfiguration)

== Development Tools ==
- Currently based on IAR Embedded Workbench
- Compiling with gcc for MSP430 is also possible
- Energy estimation methodology

== Availability ==
The first version of PowWow were released July 2009. PowWow V1 includes the motherboard, the radio board and the software. A first prototype of the coprocessing board is currently available but not yet distributed. PowWow V2 is under development.

PowWow is delivered as an open-source hardware and open source software under the GPL license.
