= Onfleet =

Delivery software company

- Type: Private
- Founded: 2012; 14 years ago in San Francisco, U.S.
- Founders: David Vetrano; Mikel Carmenes Cavia; Khaled Naim
- Headquarters: San Francisco, U.S.
- Area served: Worldwide
- Key people: Khaled Naim (CEO); Scott Cross (CFO)
- Number of employees: 88 (2021)
- Website: www.onfleet.com

Onfleet is a San Francisco-based delivery software company, specializing in last mile delivery. Its customers include Sweetgreen, Kroger and Total Wine & More.

A number of publications, including Inc. magazine and TechCrunch, have called the company "Uber for delivery".

Software designed by the company allows a retailer to communicate with delivery drivers while providing services such as optimizing routes and allowing customers to track deliveries.

The company provides software as a service for delivery businesses, charging a monthly fee for using their software. A small number of deliveries are free, and the company's largest clients perform over 100,000 deliveries a month.

Onfleet also helps businesses outsource delivery couriers, using the platform as a collaboration tool.

Onfleet has clients in over 50 countries. In 2020, 75% of the company's business was done in North America.

== History ==
The company was founded in 2012 by group of Stanford University students: David Vetrano, Mikel Carmenes Cavia and Khaled Naim.

The idea of the company evolved from Addy, a simple address resolution app created by Khaled Naim that was intended to simplify navigation in the cities of the Middle East, where, according to him, addresses "are either nonexistent or very difficult to communicate." The app allowed a short link to be passed to the addressee that opened a map showing the route to the destination, and notes about the route. In January 2014, the app was used in over 25 countries.

With the onset of COVID-19 pandemic, the company offered its platform for free to pandemic first responders, including those delivering lab samples, medicines and medical equipment. The company also started offering contact-less delivery. In the first weeks of April 2020, the number of deliveries increased 35% compared to the previous month, to over 100,000 deliveries per day. The profits have also grown due to legalization of cannabis in a number of US states; since the onset of the pandemic, the number of alcohol and cannabis related deliveries increased fourfold.

== Funding ==
In April 2015, they received $2 million of funding from a number of angel investors, including Stanford University's own business accelerator program StartX.

The company received $14 million from the investors at the end of 2020, in Series A round of funding, and $23 million in Series B round of funding in June 2022.

== Recognition ==
In 2019, it was named 124th of "most successful companies" in a list compiled by Inc. magazine. The San Francisco Business Times named it 13th in its list of 100 fastest growing businesses of San Francisco.
