= Flounder Island =

Island in Graham Land, Antarctica

Flounder Island (66°1′S 65°24′W) is the largest of the Fish Islands at the north side of Holtedahl Bay, off the west coast of Graham Land, Antarctica. It was charted by the British Graham Land Expedition under John Rymill, 1934–37, and so named by the UK Antarctic Place-Names Committee in 1959 after the flounder, in association with the Fish Islands.

== See also ==
- List of Antarctic and sub-Antarctic islands
