= Pine64 =

Computer hardware company producing ARM-based devices

Pine Store Limited
- Trade name: Pine64
- Formerly: Pine Microsystems Inc.
- Type: Private
- Industry: Computer hardware; Consumer electronics
- Founded: October 2015; 11 years ago in Fremont, California, United States
- Founder: TL Lim; Johnson Jeng
- Headquarters: Hong Kong
- Area served: Worldwide
- Key people: TL Lim (CEO)
- Products: PinePhone; Pinebook; PineTime; PineTab; PineNote; Rock64
- Website: pine64.org

Pine Store Limited, doing business as Pine64 (styled as PINE64, formerly Pine Microsystems), is a Hong Kong-based organization that designs, manufactures, and sells single-board computers, notebook computers, smartphones, and smartwatches. Its name is inspired by the mathematical constants π and e with a reference to 64-bit computing.

== History ==
Pine64 initially operated in Fremont, California, as Pine Microsystems Inc. It was founded by TL Lim, inventor of the PopBox and Popcorn Hour series of digital media players sold under the Syabas and Cloud Media brands.

In 2015, Pine Microsystems offered its first product, the Pine A64, a single-board computer designed to compete with the popular Raspberry Pi in power and price. The A64 was first funded through a Kickstarter crowdfunding drive in December 2015 which raised over US$1.7 million. The Kickstarter project was overshadowed by delays and shipping problems. The original Kickstarter page referred to Pine64 Inc. based in Delaware, but all devices for the Kickstarter campaign were manufactured and sold by Pine Microsystems Inc. based in Fremont, California.

In January 2020, Pine Microsystems Inc. was dissolved, while Pine Store Limited was incorporated on December 5, 2019, in Hong Kong. As of late 2020, the standard form contract of pine64.com binds all orders to the laws of Malaysia, while the products are shipped from warehouses in Shenzhen, China and Hong Kong.

== Devices ==
After the initial Kickstarter orders for the Pine A64 single-board computers, the company went on to make more devices.

=== Single-board computers ===
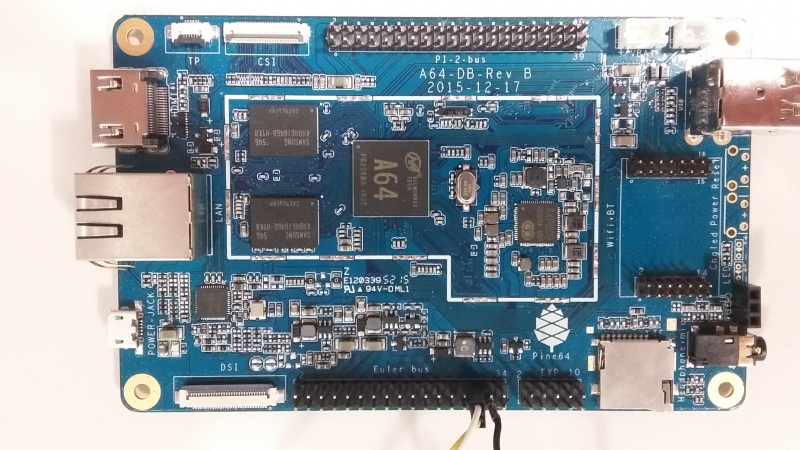
Pine A64+

The original Pine A64 boards released in 2016 are powered by the Allwinner A64 system-on-chip. It features a 1.2 GHz quad-core ARM Cortex-A53 64-bit processor, an ARM Mali 400 MP2 graphics processing unit, one HDMI 1.4a port, one MicroSD slot, two USB 2.0 ports and a 100 Megabit Ethernet port. The A64 board has only 512 megabytes of random-access memory (RAM), the 1 GiB and 2 GiB versions are labeled "Pine A64+". While the 512 MiB model only works with Arch Linux and Debian Linux distributions, such as Armbian or DietPi, the A64+ with more memory can also run other operating systems including Android, Remix OS, Windows 10, FreeBSD, and Ubuntu. Optional eMMC storage modules can be plugged into special headers on the board.

A compute module named SoPine A64 was introduced in January 2017. It features the same system-on-chip as the Pine A64, but mounted on a DDR3 SODIMM form factor board without the USB, HDMI, and Ethernet connectors. It competes with the Raspberry Pi Compute Modules. Pine64 sells a "Clusterboard" with an inbuilt eight-port Gigabit Ethernet switch, which can be used to build a cluster system out of up to seven SoPine modules. A review by Hackaday noted problems with production quality, software, and user support. In 2017, the firm added a "Long Term Supply" (LTS) version of the Pine A64/A64+ boards, named "Pine A64/A64(+)- LTS". The LTS versions are identical to the A64/A64+, but are guaranteed to be available until the year 2022 at a slightly higher cost.

In July 2017, the company added a new line of single-board computers based on Rockchip SoCs. The Rock64 features a Rockchip RK3328 quad-core ARM Cortex-A53 64-bit processor; a Mali-450MP2 GPU able to play 4K resolution high-dynamic-range video (HDR) videos; one, two, or four gigabytes of RAM; two USB 2.0 and one USB 3.0 ports; one HDMI 2.0 port; a Gigabit Ethernet port; a microSD slot and several other peripheral ports. Its larger brother, the RockPro64, is based on a Rockchip RK3399 hexa-core (dual ARM Cortex-A72 and quad ARM Cortex A53) 64-bit processor instead. It features a Mali T-860 quad-core GPU and, along with the standard USB, Ethernet, HDMI, and MicroSD ports, also has an Embedded DisplayPort (eDP) interface and an open-ended PCI Express x4 slot. An optional PCI Express to dual SATA-II adapter and an optional Wi-Fi module are offered by Pine64

In 2019, a new Allwinner-based board was added as a direct competitor to the Raspberry Pi 3 Model B+. The Pine H64 is based on the Allwinner H6 quad-core ARM Cortex-A53 64-bit processor. It features a Mali T-722 GPU, two or three gigabytes of RAM, two USB 2.0 and one USB 3.0 ports, one HDMI 2.0 port, onboard 802.11n Wi-Fi, a Gigabit Ethernet port, a microSD slot and several other peripheral ports. The Star64 is Pine64's first RISC-V SBC, based on the StarFive JH7110 SoC, launched in September 2022.

=== Notebook computers ===
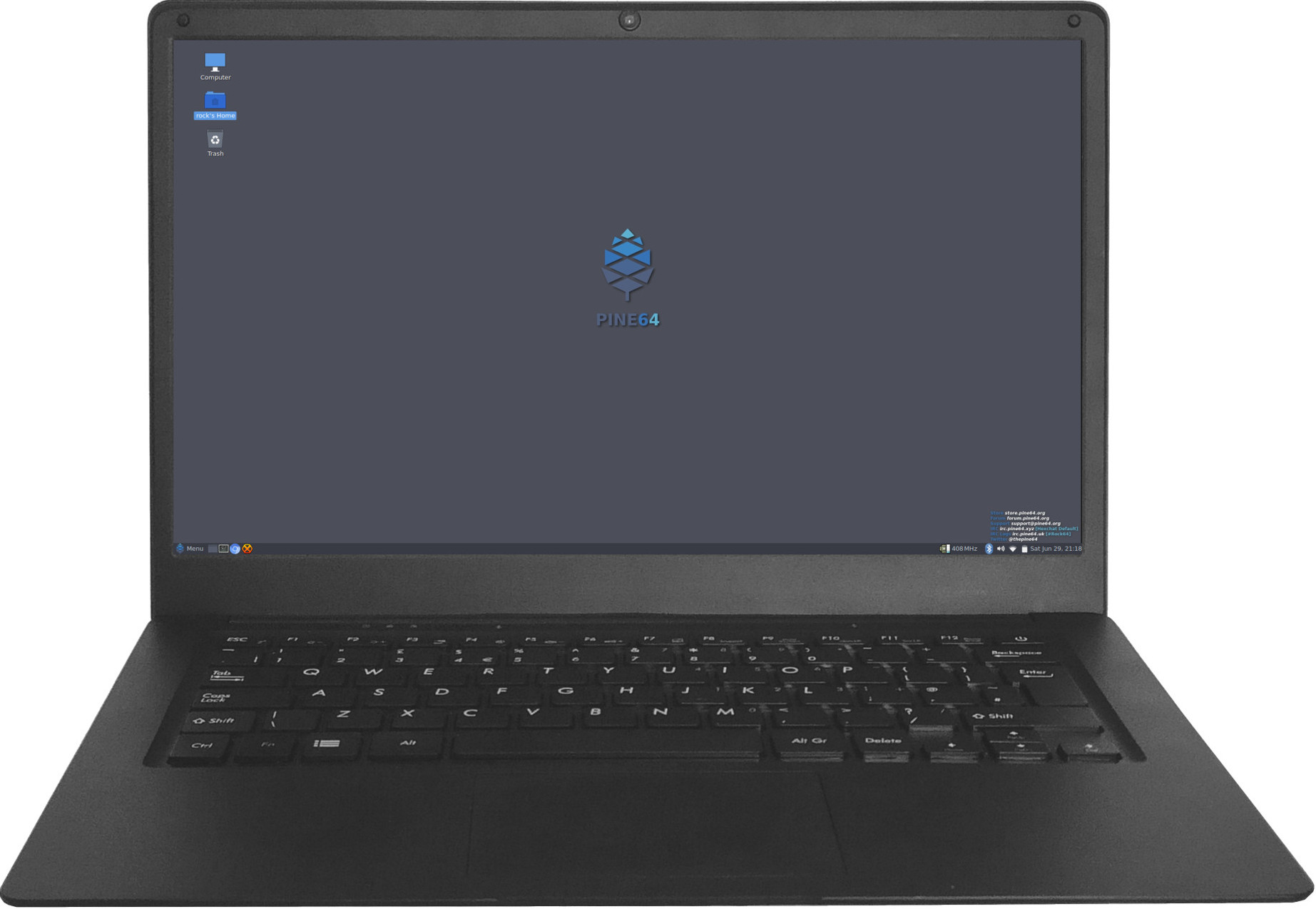
Pinebook Pro

In November 2016, the Pinebook, a netbook built around an Allwinner A64 SoC with 2 GiB of RAM and a 16 GiB eMMC module, was announced. Pre-release comments in Make wrote that the A64's closest analog was two to three times the A64's price, and that the A64 continued the Raspberry Pi's trend of breaking barriers for engineers.

Production started in April 2017. The Pinebook can only be obtained via a build-to-order system, potential buyers have to wait weeks or even months for an order code which then has to be redeemed within 72 hours. The hardware is priced at $99, but due to a $30 shipping fee and country-dependent import duties and taxes, the final price is higher. The Pinebook was notably used by the KDE team to improve Plasma on ARM desktops. In a review of the final hardware by Linux.com, the reviewer was surprised at the ability to have the full, albeit slow, Mate desktop environment at the A64's price. Phoronix's benchmarks indicated similar CPU performance to a Raspberry Pi 3.

In July 2019, the company announced the PineBook Pro, a netbook based around the Rockchip RK3399 SoC which is also used in the RockPro64. The pre-order system went live on July 25, 2019. The device was priced at $199, though the final price after shipping and import duties and taxes was higher. On March 15, 2020, it was announced that the PineBook Pro will ship with Arch Linux based Manjaro Linux as the default operating system.

=== Smartphone ===
As of 2019, Pine64 is working on a Linux smartphone, PinePhone, using a quad-core ARM Cortex-A53 64-bit system on a chip (SoC). The aim is for the phone to be compatible with any mainline Linux kernel and to "support existing and well established Linux-on-Phone projects", as a community-developed smartphone. After an initial BraveHeart release for early adopters in February 2020, the company continued releasing Community Editions that incrementally improve the design. The community support has been excellent, with 17 different OSes released for the device. In October 2021, the company announced the PinePhone Pro based on a binned RK3399 SoC with additional RAM and MMC storage, and higher resolution cameras.

=== Tablets ===
In May 2020, Pine64 announced the PineTab tablet, with an optional detachable backlit keyboard. It is a 10" tablet based on the same technology as the PinePhone, but without the modem and kill switches of that model. In August 2021, the company announced the PineNote. The PineNote is a 10" tablet with a Rockchip RK3566 and 4 GiB RAM, the same configuration used for the new Quartz64 SBCs. The tablet features a 227 DPI touchscreen E Ink display panel that also includes a Wacom digitizer layer for stylus support. In December 2022, Pine64 announced the PineTab 2, intended to be a successor to the original PineTab, which was heavily impacted by shipping delays and component shortages.

=== Wearables ===
In 2019, Pine64 announced that it was working on a smartwatch. Only being available for developers initially, Pine64 released the PineTime in 2021, aimed at the consumer market. The PineTime display has a resolution of 240x240 with 65,536 colors. The device features 64 KiB of RAM, 512 KiB of flash storage, and 4 MiB of additional flash storage with Bluetooth 5.0 Low Energy for connectivity. The watch is powered by the Nordic Semiconductor nRF52832 SoC, with a 64 MHz ARM Cortex-M4F processor. The device was well received for its low cost to feature ratio. In early 2022, the company announced that it was working on a set of wireless earbuds. Pine64 later revealed the PineBuds, true wireless earbuds intended to run open-source firmware.

=== Soldering irons ===
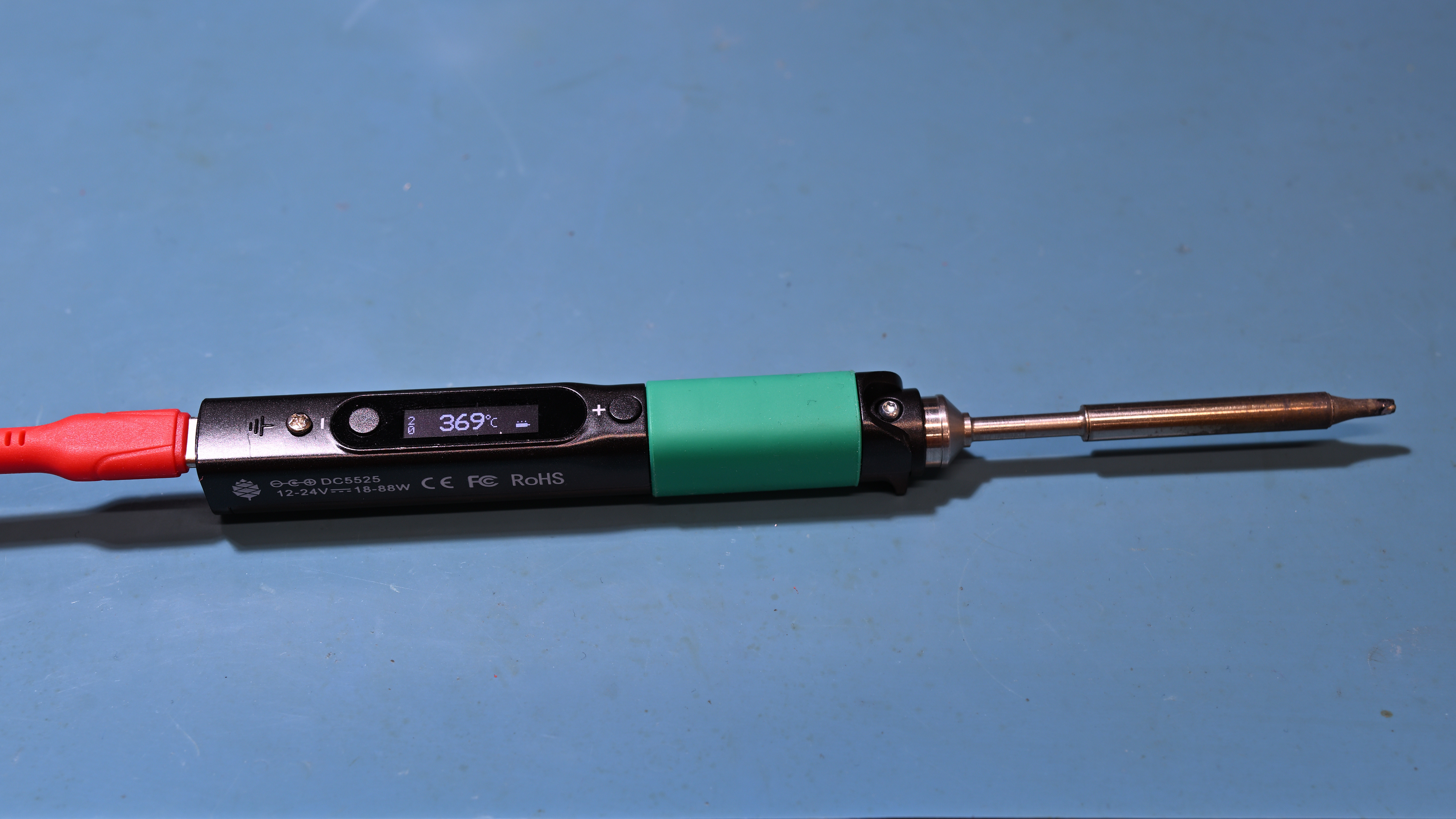
Pinecil v2

The Pinecil is an open-source soldering iron released by Pine64. It features a RISC-V based CPU made by SiFive, 132KB of static random-access memory (SRAM), 192KB of internal storage and runs a custom open-source firmware named "IronOS". The Pinecil accepts a DC barrel connector and USB-C PD as a source of power. It accepts up to 88W officially but can accept up to 128W by using EPR and compatible cables.

Version 2 of the Pinecil launched on Aug 2, 2022, improving much of the first iterations flaws. It increased performance and heating speed by reducing the resistance of the soldering tip from 8 ohms to 6.2 ohms. It also changed the CPU to one manufactured by Chinese company Bouffalo Lab.

=== Smart speaker ===
In June 2026 Pine64 launch smart speaker based on Bouffalo Lab BL606P RISC-V SoC with integrated Wi-Fi, Bluetooth 5.0 and Zigbee radio interfaces.
