= Pinebook =

Notebook intended for open-source software

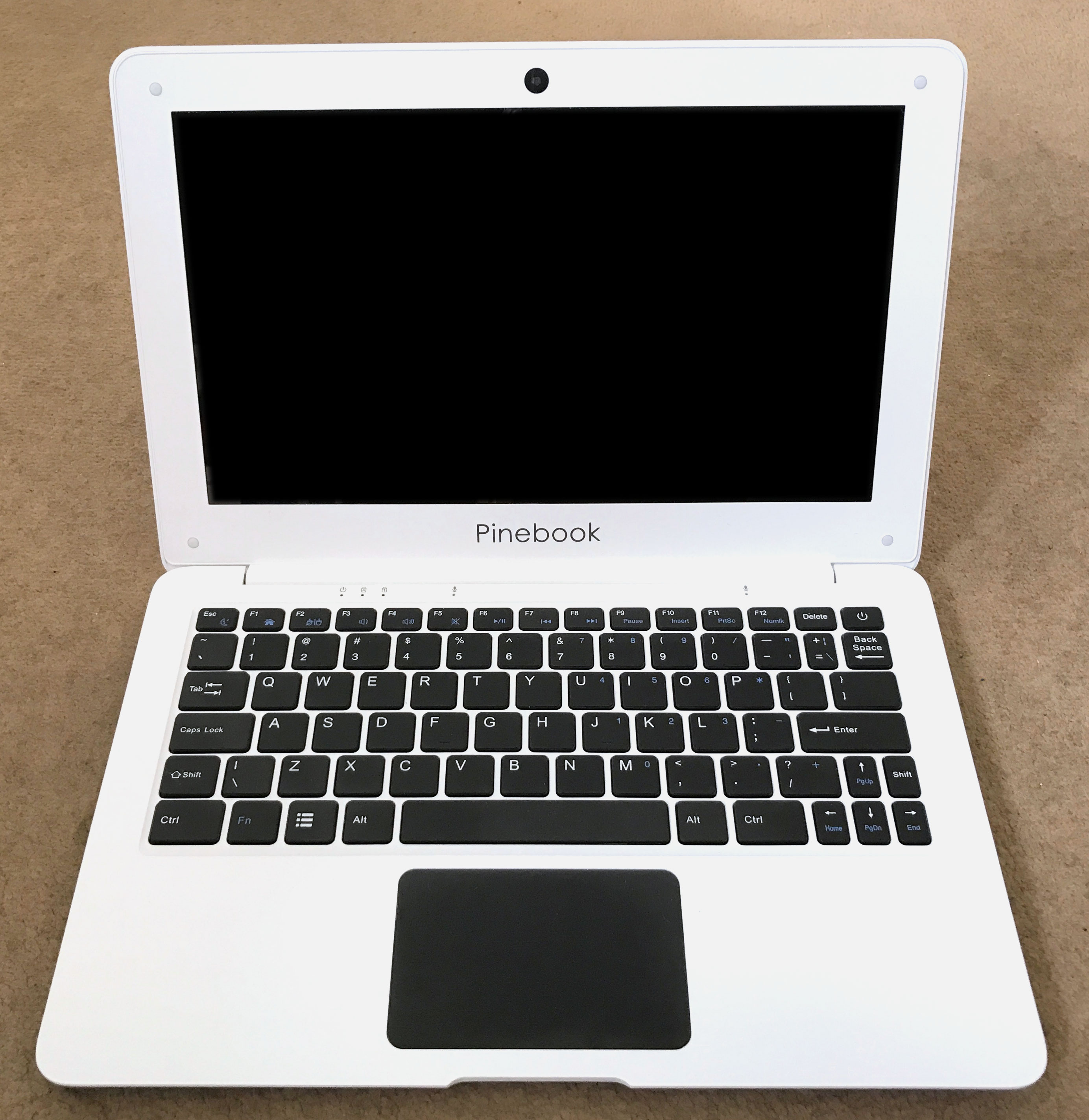
- Pinebook 11.6" version
- Manufacturer: Pine64
- Product family: Pinebook
- Type: Laptop
- Operating system: Linux and others
- CPU: Allwinner A64 ARM Quad core Cortex-A53, 64bit @ 1.2GHz
- Memory: 2 GB LPDDR3
- Storage: 16 GB eMMC flash memory, expandable up to 64GB
- Removable storage: microSD slot (up to 256 GB)
- Display: 1366×768 11.6" or 14" IPS LCD
- Graphics: Mali-400 MP2
- Connectivity: Wi-Fi 802.11b/g/n, Bluetooth 4, 3.5mm headphone jack, 2x USB 2.0 ports, Mini-HDMI
- Power: 10,000mAh

The Pinebook is a low-cost notebook developed by Hong Kong–based computer manufacturer Pine64. The Pinebook was announced in November 2016 and production started in April 2017. It is based on the platform of Pine64's existing Pine A64 single board computer, costing US$89 or $99 for the 11.6" and 14" model respectively. Its appearance resembles the MacBook Air. The Pinebook is sold "at-cost" by Pine64 as a community service.

== Hardware ==
Pinebook uses an ARM CPU rather than x86. It uses the Allwinner Technology A64 SoC, containing quad ARM 1.2 GHz Cortex-A53 cores and Mali-400 MP2 GPU, together with 2 GB RAM LPDDR3 and a 10,000mAh battery. Instead of a hard disk drive, it uses 16 GB of eMMC 5.0 flash memory, expandable to 64 GB. The storage capacity can be further extended using the microSD card slot (up to 256 GB).

It supports WiFi 802.11b/g/n and Bluetooth 4.0 wireless networks, has 2 USB 2.0 ports, 1 mini HDMI port and a headphone jack. It also contains 2 downward-facing speakers. The display is an IPS LCD with a resolution of 1366 x 768. The device weighs 1.04 kg (11.6"), or 1.26 kg (14") respectively.

== Software ==
The Pinebook supports Linux and Android operating systems. As of 2019, the Pinebook can be run on free software in the form of RISC OS and Linux. Common choices include Manjaro, Arch, Debian, Armbian, BSD, Gentoo, Fedora, OpenSUSE, and Q4OS. Support for most hardware has been merged into the kernel mainline as of 4.19, with other drivers slowly trickling in.

== Gallery ==
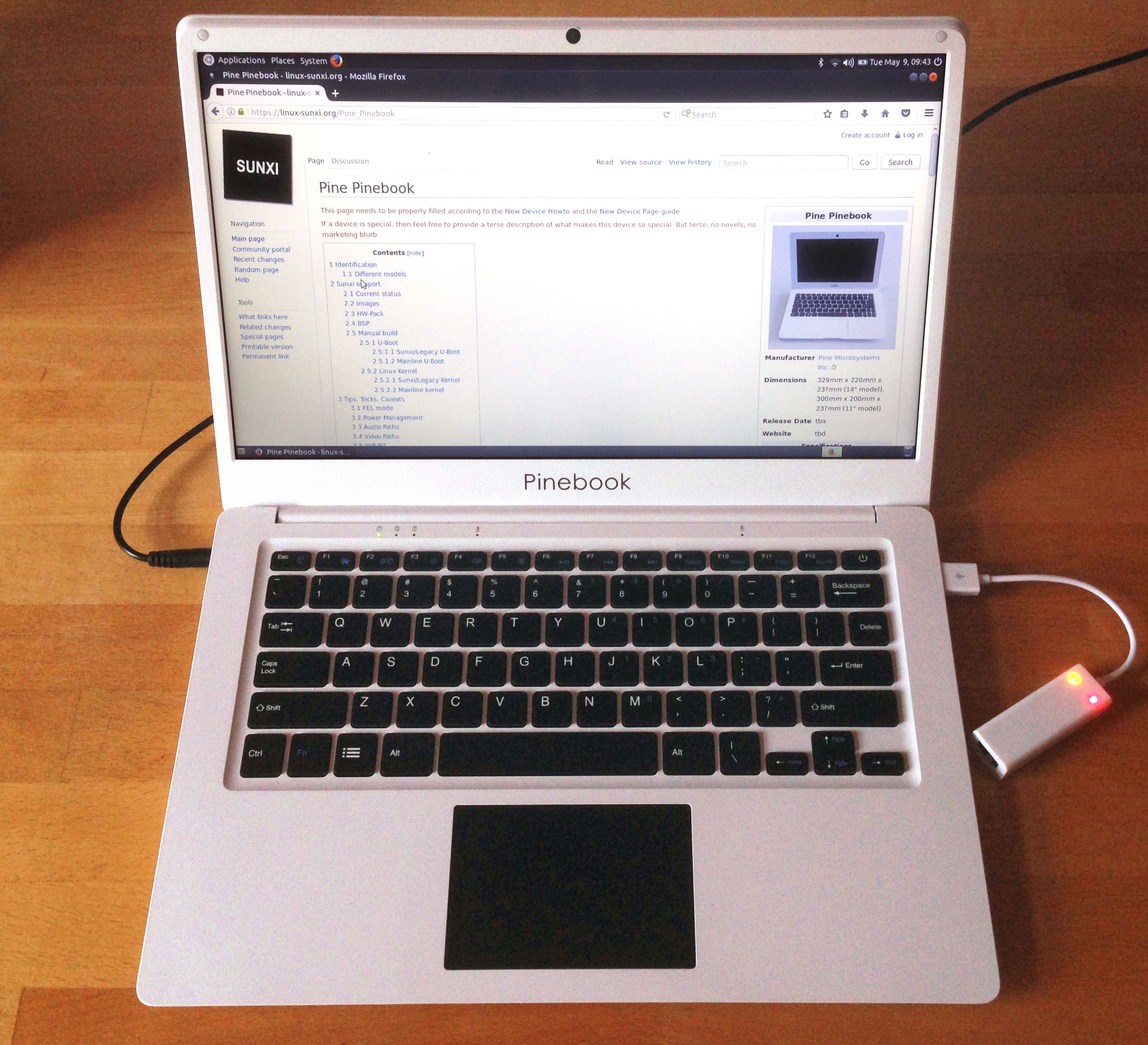
Pinebook 14" with Ethernet adapter

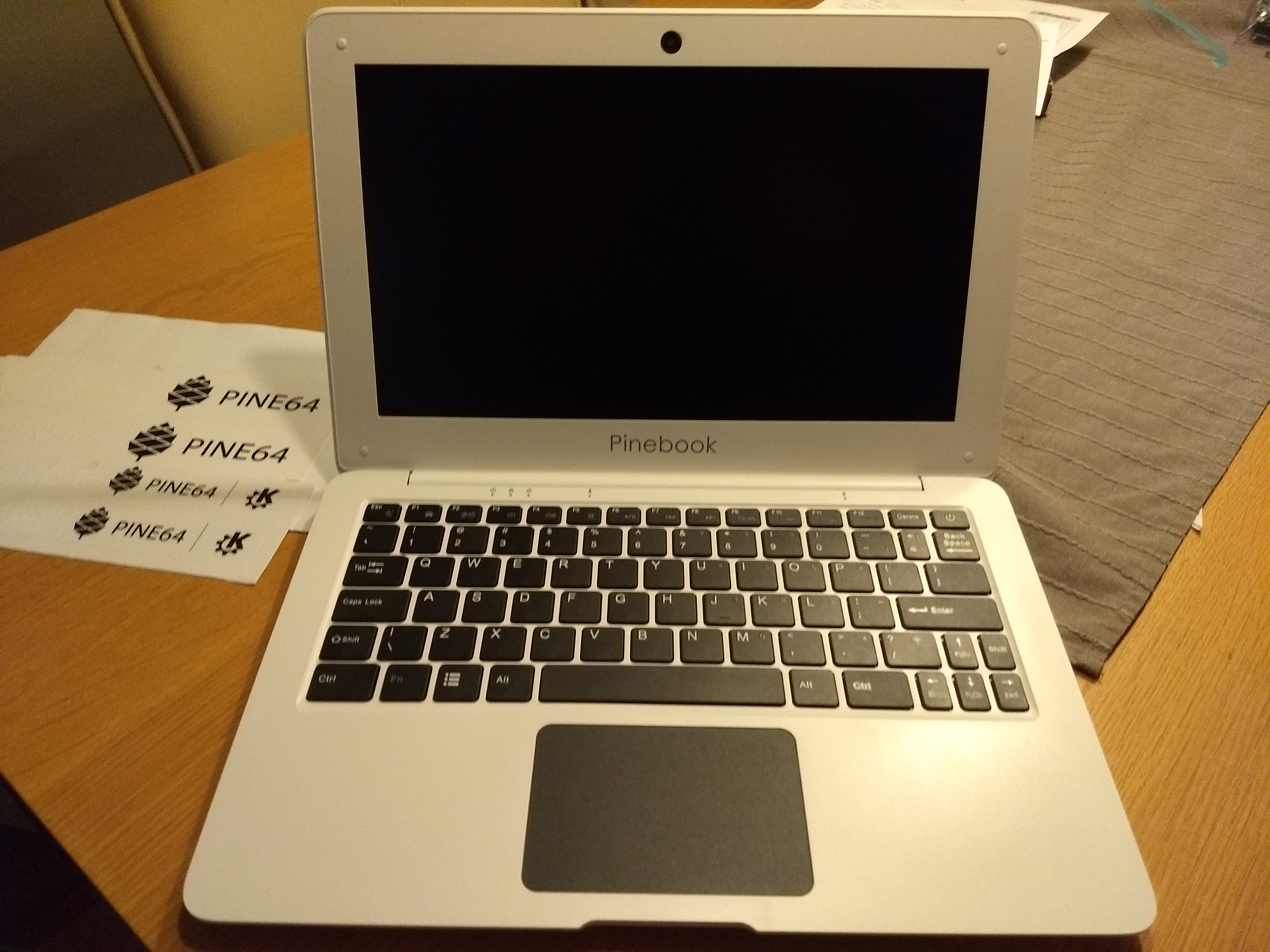
Pinebook

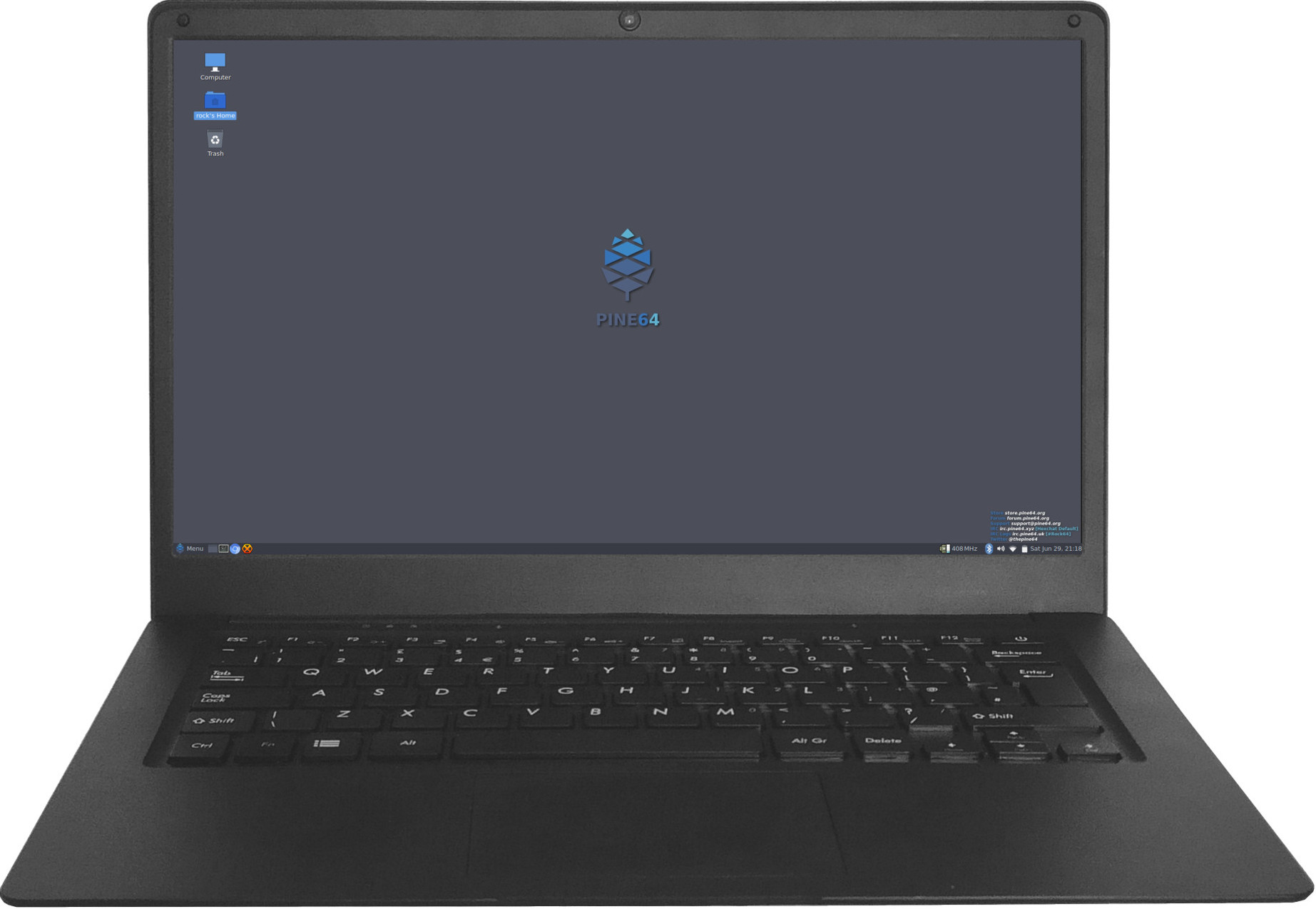
Pinebook Pro

== See also ==
- PinePhone
- PineTab
- Open-source hardware
