= Humane Reader and Humane PC =

The Humane Reader and Humane PC are two open-source hardware projects created by research scientist and inventor Braddock Gaskill.

== Humane Reader ==
The Humane Reader has received coverage from publications including Wired, Make, Engadget, OSNews, Ethiopian Review, and Linux Journal.

According to Wired, the Human Reader "takes two 8-bit microcontrollers and packages them in a 'classic style console' that connects to a TV. The device includes an optional keyboard, a micro-SD Card reader and a composite video output. It uses a standard micro-USB cellphone charger for power. In all, it can hold the equivalent of 5,000 books, including an offline version of Wikipedia, and requires no internet connection."

== Humane PC ==
According to Gaskill's website, the Humane PC is an 8-bit microcomputer that "combines the ease of Arduino development with the excitement of a classic stand-alone television-and-keyboard PC."

Wired wrote that "The PC has almost the same specs as the Reader but offers additional features such as a micro-USB port and infrared port."
