= Neuros Technology =

American company

Neuros Technology International, LLC
- Logo of Neuros Audio
- Company type: Private company
- Industry: Electronics
- Founded: 2003
- Headquarters: Chicago, Illinois, United States
- Key people: Joe Born, Founder, chairman and CEO; Collin Anderson, President
- Products: Multimedia players, set-top boxes

Neuros Technology was a Chicago, Illinois–based company that produced a number of audio and video devices under the brand name Neuros. Founded by Joe Born in 2001 as a division of Digital Innovations, it previously operated under the name Neuros Audio. Like Digital Innovations, Neuros distinguished itself by its use of open-innovation and crowdsourcing techniques to bring products to market, as well as by its prominent use of open-source software and open-source hardware. In its development model, end users were involved throughout the product development process from reviewing initial concepts to beta testing initial product releases.

== Products ==
=== Neuros LINK ===
The Neuros LINK is an open set-top device designed to bring Internet television and other video to the television, it comes pre-installed with XBMC Media Center. The Neuros LINK supports the web's open standards allows Internet television sites to be viewed directly on a television set. The Neuros LINK is positioned between three categories, a HTPC (Home Theater PC), digital media receiver (a.k.a. media extender), and the standard Internet-to-television devices or set-top-boxes. It is open and allows access to all content sources using software and hardware components from a PC, but positioned as a lower cost, smaller consumer electronics device designed to be connected to a television set.

=== Neuros OSD ===
The Neuros OSD is a device to archive, organize, and play video content. It can record from any source with composite output including DVD players, VCRs and others. The video input is converted to MP4 format and then output to a user-installed device, either a memory card, a USB flash drive or USB hard drive, or to a network-connected PC. The resulting MP4 files can then be played back by the OSD on a TV, or by other devices with MP4 playback capability such as Sony's PlayStation Portable, Apple's iPod, Neuros 442 and other portable devices.

OSD stands for "open-source device", because the device runs Linux and a variety of open-source software, as well as to reflect the vision that the device will become a general purpose device for linking computer and electronic devices. The successor to the Neuros MPEG 4 Recorder, the Neuros OSD was released to initial production on September 20, 2006.

The development platform uses a Texas Instruments DM320 system on chip, comprising an ARM926EJ core and a TI C54x DSP core. This design will support the DM320's High Performance mode of operation. The maximum ARM clock is then specified as 203 MHz. The DSP is rated in excess of 120 MHz. In addition, the SoC also contains dedicated hardware acceleration for video encoding and decoding, making it capable of achieving DVD-like quality playback as well as high quality, D1 resolution video encoding using MPEG-4.

=== Neuros digital audio computer ===
The Neuros Digital Audio Computer (Neuros DAC) is a portable audio unit designed for playback and recording of audio in MP3, Ogg Vorbis, WAV, and DRM-free WMA formats.

Neuros DACs feature a two-piece design, separating the unit into a player and a "backpack". The player unit is upgradeable by firmware upgrade from the website. The intended purpose of these design decisions are that you can upgrade your player/backpack without paying for an entirely new model. There are currently two types of backpacks. The smaller backpack contains just a pair of NiMH batteries, so the player depends on the internal flash memory to store music. The larger backpack contains a LiIon battery and a 2.5-inch hard drive. The main difference between Neuros1 and Neuros2 players is the backpack on Neuros2 has a USB 2.0 connector allowing it to be used, independently of the player unit, as a stand-alone USB hard drive. The Neuros DAC is not currently in production, but a third version of the product has been rumored.

=== Neuros MPEG 4 recorder ===
The Neuros MPEG 4 Recorder is a flash-based digital recorder that works like a miniature VCR (sans TV tuner card), allowing users to record live TV from an analog video sources (for example a DVD player or camcorder), have it encoded in real-time and stored onto a flash memory card. It is capable of recording and playing back MPEG-4 and has several unique consumer benefits like ignoring Macrovision's automatic gain control copy protection.

The Recorder was first released to the public on February 9, 2005 in woot.com's first product launch. That launch was part of Neuros Technology's gamma test program and consisted of 850 units sold at $119.99 (US) each.

The Neuros MPEG4 Recorder was revised as version 2 with an enhanced processor and higher resolution recording (480p) for use with devices such as the iPod, PlayStation Portable, smartphones and other handhelds.

== Open development methods ==
=== Open innovation ===
Neuros uses many of the tools of the open-source world to not only collaborate on building the software but to get user feedback on features and implementation as well. Products are typically launched explicitly before the software is complete under Beta and Gamma programs. As community members develop new features, often in response to posted bounties, Neuros promotes that work to other users and gauges reaction. This crowdsourced process has been viewed by some as a hybrid between traditional market research and open-source collaboration.

=== Open-source software and hardware ===
A distinguishing feature of the Neuros devices is that they use open-source software and use open-source methods in the development of their devices; open-source software is regularly used as well as the release of documentation surrounding the hardware. This also allows the devices to be adapted for other purposes than the advertised uses, such as including home and auto-security recording.

In addition the company advocates consumers digital rights by making products that assert those rights, allowing unfettered recording from a variety of sources. In December 2007, Neuros developed an "Unlocked Media" name and logo for DRM-free media to allow companies to brand their products in such a way that consumers know they're getting a fully portable file.
