= PLAICE =

The PLAICE, or FLASH-PLAICE, is a powerful open source hardware device, combining a flash memory programmer, in-circuit emulation, and a high-speed multi-channel logic analyzer. It is built around a 32-bit RISC Microblaze processor, realized on a Xilinx Spartan-3E starter kit development board. The platform-independent control software is written in Java, and contains plugins for I2C and SPI Bus analyzers.
