= Fish Islands =

Group of islands off the coast of West Antarctica

The Fish Islands (66°2′S 65°25′W) are a group of small islands lying in the northern part of the entrance to Holtedahl Bay, off the west coast of Graham Land, Antarctica. They were discovered and named by the British Graham Land Expedition, 1934–37, under John Rymill.

The Fish Islands are between Crystal Sound to the south and Grandidier Channel to the north, sheltered to the east of Renaud Island. The Fish Islands and The Minnows, small islets to the east, are occupied by an estimated 4,000 breeding pairs of Adelie penguins, and there is a small Antarctic shag (part of the imperial shag bird family) colony.

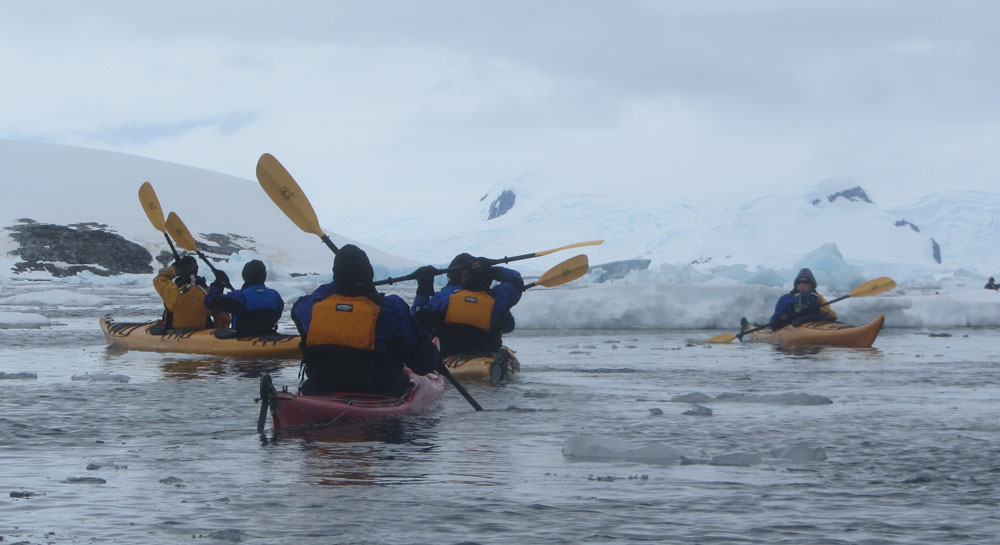
Kayakers near the Fish Islands

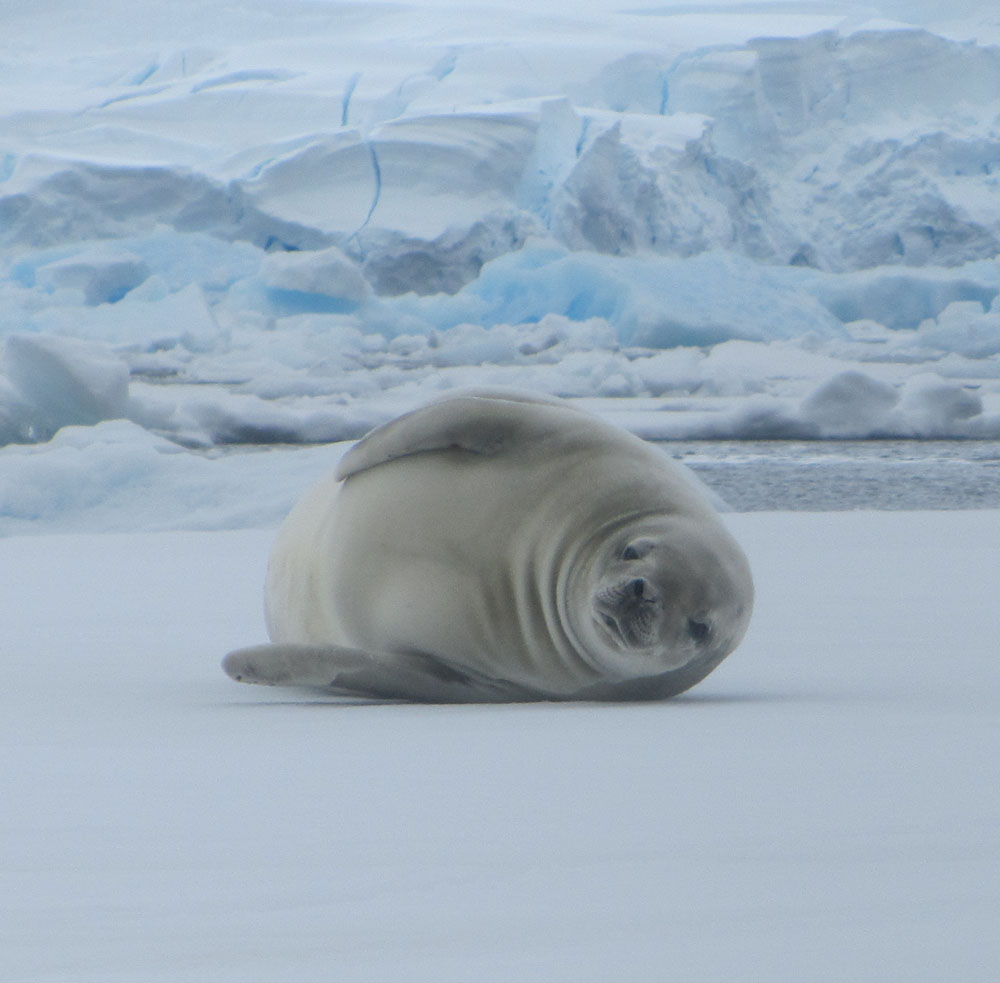
Seal on an ice floe near the Fish Islands

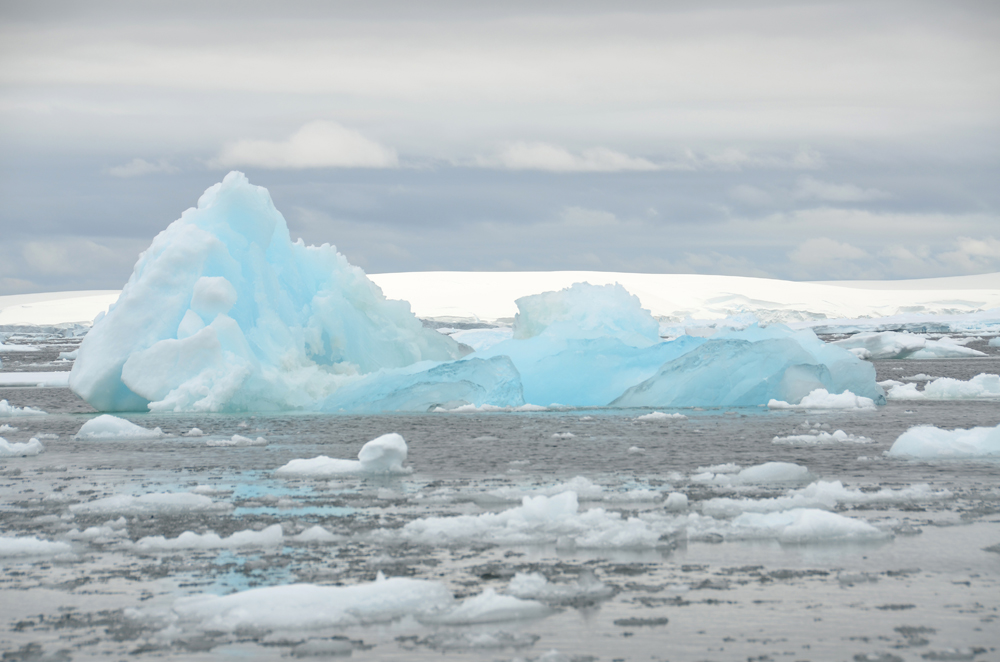
Iceberg near the Fish Islands

== See also ==
- List of Antarctic and sub-Antarctic islands
