= PrivatOS =

- Developer: Silent Circle
- Written in: C (core), C++
- OS family: Unix-like
- Working state: Discontinued
- Source model: Closed source
- Initial release: June 1, 2014
- Marketing target: Blackphone smartphones
- Update method: Google Store
- Package manager: Google Play, APK
- Supported platforms: 32- and 64-bit ARM architectures
- Kernel type: Monolithic (modified Linux kernel)
- Default user interface: Graphical (Multi-touch)
- License: Proprietary software except for open-source components
- Official website: www.silentcircle.com

PrivatOS was an operating system used in the Blackphone from June 1, 2014, to June 30, 2016. It was targeted at users who sought improved privacy and security. It provided encryption for phone calls, emails, texts, and internet browsing. PrivatOS was a modified version of Android, forked from Android 4.4.2, that came with a bundle of security-minded tools. However, in contrast to Android, PrivatOS was not open source. The company that shipped PrivatOS, SGP Technologies is a joint venture between the makers of GeeksPhone, and Silent Circle.

== Background ==
The concept of an encrypted phone had long been an interest of Silent Circle founder and PGP creator, Phil Zimmermann. In a video on Blackphone's website, Zimmermann said,

I had to wait for the rest of the technology infrastructure to catch up to make it possible to do secure telephony. PGP was kind of a detour for me while waiting for the rest of the technology to catch up to make really good secure telephony possible.

== Features ==
The company stated its operating system was able to “close all backdoors” which were usually found on major mobile operating systems. Some major features of PrivatOS were anonymous search, privacy-enabled bundled apps, smart disabling of Wi-Fi except trusted hotspots, more control in app permissions, private communication (calling, texting, video chat, browsing, file sharing and conference calls). Geeksphone also claimed the phone would receive frequent secure updates from Blackphone directly.

== Reception ==
Ars Technica praised that the Blackphone's Security Center in PrivatOS gave control over app permissions and liked that PrivatOS came bundled with the Silent Phone, Silent Text, Disconnect VPN and Disconnect Search services. Ars did not like that the phone’s performance was mediocre, using a custom OS meant no Google Play or any of the other benefits of the Google ecosystem, spotty support for sideloaded apps, and reliance on Amazon or other third-party app stores. After a month of using the device, Joshua Drake from Accuvant concluded that Blackphone's security claims were overstated, criticizing the closed-source nature of the OS and a lack of OS or kernel hardening features, but praising its fast patching and added features.
