= ZTE Open =

Smartphone model

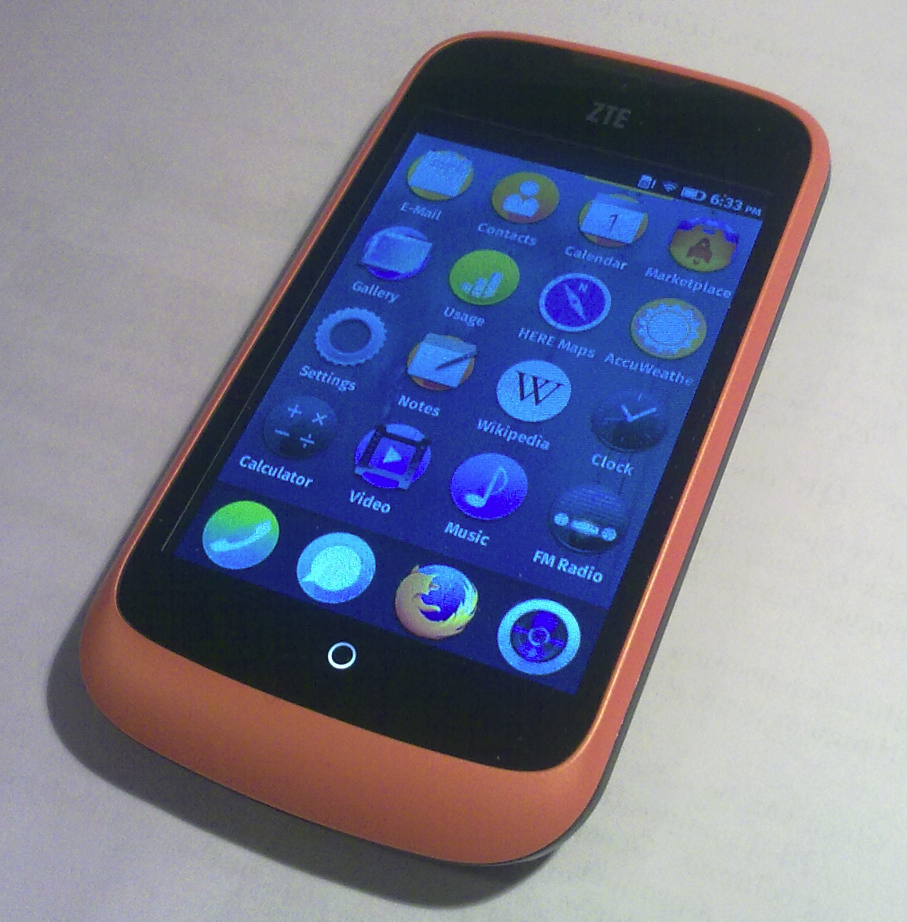
- Manufacturer: ZTE
- First released: July 2, 2013
- Compatible networks: GSM 850 / 900 / 1800 / 1900; HSDPA (Quad-band)
- Form factor: Bar
- Dimensions: Height: 114 millimetres (4.5 in); Width: 62 millimetres (2.4 in); Thickness: 12.5 millimetres (0.49 in)
- Operating system: Firefox OS 1.1
- CPU: 1 GHz Qualcomm Snapdragon MSM7225A processor (ARMv7)
- Memory: 256 MB
- Storage: 512 MB
- Removable storage: microSD, up to 32 GB
- Battery: 1200 mAh battery; micro-USB charging
- Rear camera: 3.1 MP
- Display: 320 × 480 px (HVGA) capacitive touchscreen, 3.5", 165 ppi
- Connectivity: WLAN IEEE 802.11 b/g/n; Bluetooth 2.1; micro-USB 2.0; GPS with A-GPS; FM radio; mini-SIM card
- Data inputs: Capacitive multi-touch TFT display
- SAR: Head: 0.947 W/kg 1 g Body: 1.480 W/kg 1 g Hotspot:

The ZTE Open is an entry-level smartphone released by ZTE on July 2, 2013. It is intended for software developers wanting to build and test mobile applications on Firefox OS, though it was sold commercially in Spain.

ZTE Open was launched in India in October 2013, in collaboration with eBay India (eBay.in). The device is not freely available in that the vendor requires a PayPal account.

== Rooting ==
The phone can be rooted by exploiting a known security vulnerability, CVE-2012-4220 a.k.a. Qualcomm DIAG root. This vulnerability was discovered 7 months before the ZTE Open was released. The vulnerability in question can be used to modify system files, but it cannot be used to unlock the locked bootloader.

== See also ==
- Comparison of Firefox OS devices
- ZTE Open C
