= Intex Cloud FX =

- Developer: Intex Technologies
- Manufacturer: Intex Technologies
- Type: Smartphone
- First released: August 23, 2014
- Units sold: unknown
- Form factor: Slate
- Dimensions: 115.9 mm (4.56 in) H 62 mm (2.4 in) W 11.8 mm (0.46 in) D
- Weight: 104 g (3.7 oz)
- Operating system: Firefox OS
- Memory: 128 MiB
- Battery: Built-in rechargeable 3.7 V 1 Ah
- Rear camera: 2.0 MP with geotagging
- Display: 3.5-inch screen (diagonally); 320×480 pixel resolution at 163 ppi 2:3 aspect ratio 18-bit (262,144-color) LCD
- Sound: Two speakers TRRS headphone jack, 20 Hz to 20 kHz frequency response (internal, headset); Microphone
- Data inputs: Multi-touch touchscreen display 3-axis accelerometer Proximity sensor Microphone; Headset controls

The Intex Cloud FX is an affordable smartphone running on Firefox OS that was sold in India for ₹1,799 (initially ₹1,999). It is also sold under the Cherry Mobile brand in the Philippines where it is known as the Ace. Sporting a price tag of only 999 PhP. Intex said it had sold 15,000 devices within three days of the launch and plans to sell 500,000 devices until the end of the year.

Intex Cloud FX is the first Firefox OS-powered phone to be introduced in the Indian market. Its Philippine equivalent is also the first Firefox OS smartphone in the Philippines and in Southeast Asia.

== Features ==
Display
3.5 inches (89 mm) with 480x320 resolution (164 ppi)
Battery
1250 mAh, 1100 mAh (Ace)
Storage
256 MB (On-board), 46 MB (Available). 4 GB expandable, 16 GB expandable (Ace)
Camera
2 MP rear
SoC
Spreadtrum SC6821
CPU
1 GHz
RAM
128 MB
Operating system
Firefox OS
Connectivity
Wi-Fi, Bluetooth
SIM cards
Dual-SIM

== See also ==
- Comparison of Firefox OS devices
