= GeeksPhone Keon =

Phone designed for software development

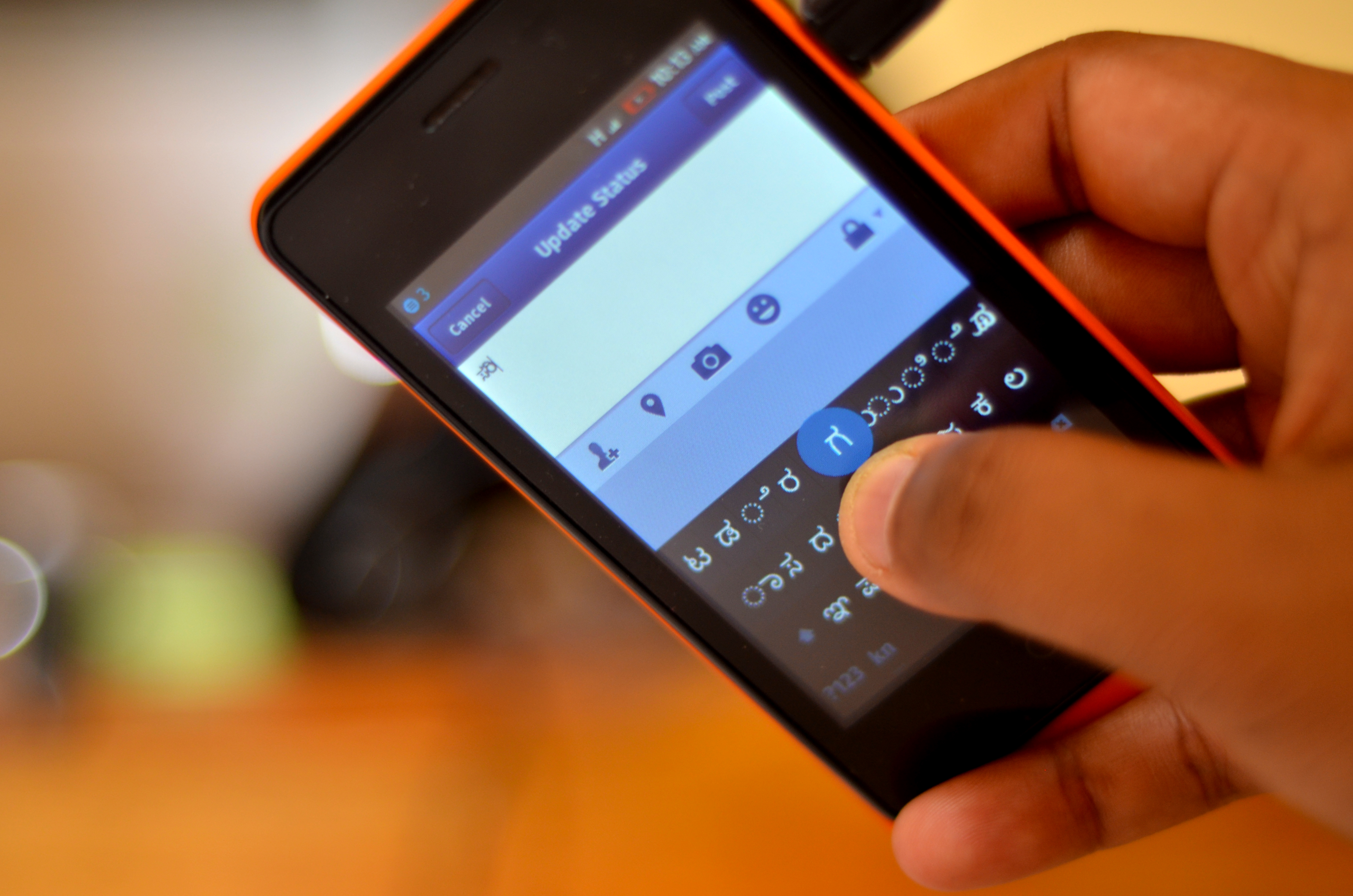
- Manufacturer: GeeksPhone
- First released: 23 April 2013
- Availability by region: 23 April 2013
- Compatible networks: GSM 850 / 900 / 1800 / 1900; HSDPA (Tri-band); HSDPA/UMTS 850 / 1900 / 2100
- Form factor: Bar
- Dimensions: Width: 2.4 inches (61 mm); Height: 4.5 inches (110 mm); Thickness: 0.4 inches (10 mm)
- Weight: 4.2 oz (120 g)
- Operating system: Firefox OS
- CPU: 1 GHz Qualcomm Snapdragon S1 7225AB processor (ARMv7)
- Memory: 512 MB
- Storage: 4 GB
- Removable storage: microSD, up to 32 GB
- Battery: 1580 mAh battery; micro-USB charging
- Rear camera: 3 MP
- Display: 480 × 320 px (HVGA) capacitive touchscreen, 3.5"
- Connectivity: WLAN IEEE 802.11 a/b/g/n; bluetooth 2.1 +EDR; micro-USB 2.0; GPS; mini-SIM card; FM receiver
- Data inputs: Capacitive multi-touch display
- SAR: Head 0.788 W/kg; Body (1cm gap) 1.160 W/kg

The GeeksPhone Keon was an entry-level smartphone released by GeeksPhone in April 2013. It was intended for software developers wanting to build and test mobile applications on the then new Firefox OS, not for general consumers.

The Keon and the higher-end Peak were the first commercially available mobile devices running Firefox OS.

== History and availability ==
GeeksPhone Keon and Peak initially became available on 23 April 2013 and the first batch sold out in a few hours.

== See also ==
- Comparison of Firefox OS devices
