= GeeksPhone Revolution =

Geeksphone Revolution
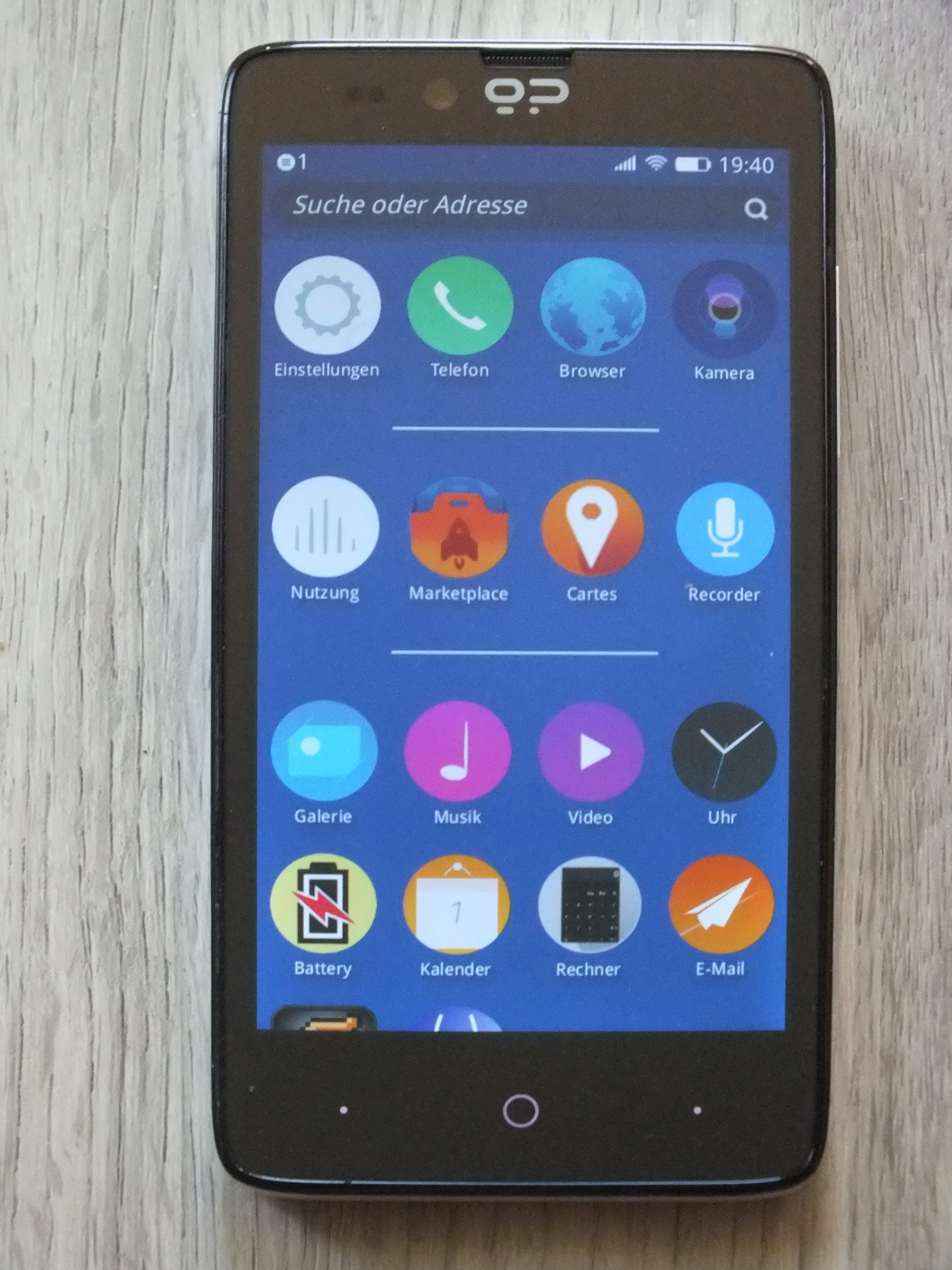
- Manufacturer: GeeksPhone
- First released: February 2014
- Availability by region: January 2014
- Compatible networks: GSM / GPRS Class 12 / EDGE Class 12 850 / 900 / 1800 / 1900; HSPA/UMTS 850 / 900 / 1900 / 2100; HSDPA, up to 21 Mbps; HSUPA, up to 5.76 Mbps
- Dimensions: Width: 135 millimetres (5.3 in); Height: 68.40 millimetres (2.693 in); Thickness: 9.8 millimetres (0.39 in)
- Operating system: Android 4.2.2 “Jellybean”, CyanogenMod 11 (based on Android 4.4 “KitKat”; Firefox OS 1.3 / 2.0
- CPU: 1.6 GHz dual-core Intel Atom Z2560
- Memory: 1 GB LPDDR2
- Storage: 4 GB EMMC
- Removable storage: microSD, up to 32 GB
- Battery: 2000 mAh removable battery; micro-USB charging
- Rear camera: 8 MP
- Front camera: 1.3 MP
- Display: 4.7" LCD
- Connectivity: WLAN IEEE 802.11 b/g/n; Bluetooth 3.0; micro-USB 2.0; GPS; AGPS; SIM
- Data inputs: Capacitive multi-touch IPS display
- Development status: Discontinued

The GeeksPhone Revolution is a smartphone released by GeeksPhone in February 2014. It uses the x86 architecture and PCI bus instead of the ARM architecture. It is capable of running either Android or Firefox OS, but lacks a dual boot facility.

It can run up to Android 4.4 and Firefox OS 2.0

== See also ==
- Comparison of Firefox OS devices
