= GeeksPhone =

Spanish smartphone company

GeeksPhone, S.L.
- Type: Sociedad Limitada
- Founded: Madrid, Spain (9 October 2009)
- Founder: Javier Agüera; Rodrigo Silva-Ramos
- Headquarters: Madrid, Spain
- Products: Smartphones
- Website: www.geeksphone.com

GeeksPhone was a Spanish smartphone company founded in 2009. GeeksPhone's most notable products are open Android phones and developer devices of Firefox OS.

== History ==
GeeksPhone was founded in early 2009 by Javier Agüera and Rodrigo Silva-Ramos. Its first product, the GeeksPhone One, was announced in 2009 and started shipping in early 2010, becoming the first European brand to launch an Android smartphone to the mass market.

It subsequently manufactured the Keon and Peak smartphone models, the first developer preview devices running Firefox OS. A consumer model, the Peak+ was announced later. It was thought to be a refinement of the Peak model, geared towards a non-developer audience, but problems concerning the availability of batteries from the Chinese ODM led to the discontinuation of the project without a single unit being marketed.

In November 2013 the company announced a new model of smartphone called Revolution. It was thought to be a high-end model, but it was then revealed to be a slight improvement from the Peak+ model.

The customers who already preordered and paid for the unreleased Peak+ model were offered to get a Revolution phone for the same price, but many cancelled their order when they knew more detailed specifics of the Revolution.

The company announced in January 2014 a new model of smartphone called Blackphone. Designed with the founders of Silent Circle and PGP in the wake of the 2013 mass surveillance revelations, the Android-based device is said to be "the first NSA-proof" smartphone. It was produced by SGP Technologies, a joint venture of Geeksphone and the software firm Silent Circle.

In early 2015, Geeksphone sold its part of SGP Technologies to Silent Circle to focus on wearables sold under the brand Geeksme.14 engineers from Geeksphone, including Javier Agüera, remained in SGP.

== Locked firmware ==
GeeksPhone has claimed to let the users install alternative OS on their mobile platforms but this has turned out not being the case since with their phone "Revolution" as they have locked the boot.img with a secret signed key that is there to prevent the user from installing any alternative firmware and also refused sharing that key. They have also stopped development of Firefox OS for the device at version 2.0.

== Philosophy ==
GeeksPhone specializes in the development, promotion and commercialization of open source mobile telephony solutions. The company considers the One smartphone and its successors (announced in late 2010) the first stage of its initiative, without making any statements about planned future stages.

The company claims to be the first to provide an Android-powered handset which allows the user to modify operating system components without having to root the device first. New OS images can easily be installed on the device; the company operates a wiki and a forum for users to share knowledge.

As of July 2010, the GeeksPhone One is not available through any of the big mobile operators. While GeeksPhone does not rule out cooperation with operators for the future, CEO Javier Agüera has stated that the “freedom-based” business model would have priority over any such agreement.

Although its philosophy is somewhat similar to that of Openmoko, GeeksPhone does not publish hardware specifications for its devices beyond a data sheet. Another difference is that GeeksPhone aims to provide a stable device suitable for everyday use and capable of competing with other commercial devices on the market. The GeeksPhone One ships with an Android version which has undergone quality tests and passed Android Open Source Project (AOSP) Code Compliance certification, allowing it to include closed-source Android components and participate in Android Market.

About emerging competitor Synapse-Phones's strategy to offer smartphones with customizable hardware, Rodrigo Silva-Ramos stated that GeeksPhone had tried the same, but found it impossible. He noted, however, that the existence of a competitor confirmed the viability of the company's business model. Synapse failed in its attempt, and went out of business shortly afterwards.

== Certified Community Release program ==
In July 2010, GeeksPhone announced their Certified Community Release (CCR) program. CCRs are Android ports developed by the community and subsequently certified by GeeksPhone. Releases may be certified as “stable” or “beta”. While full credit is given to the developer, GeeksPhone will provide technical support to users of these builds and flash phones with a CCR if requested by the customer. Use of a CCR will not void the warranty of the phone. Developers can get technical support from GeeksPhone and major contributors may receive an additional free handset for development from GeeksPhone and, in some cases, sponsorships.

GeeksPhone initially announced that phones would not yet ship with CCRs preinstalled; however, as of at least October 2010, phones have been shipped with RCMod 3, a CCR based on Android 2.2 (Froyo).

== Products ==
Model	Type	OS	MHz	RAM	Flash	Screen	MP	Sold in	Availability
One	Smartphone	Android						2009–2010	Out of stock
Zero	Smartphone	Android	600	256 MB	512 MB	3.2" HVGA	5	2011	Not sold anymore
Two	Smartphone	Android						Announced for 2011, fate unknown	Not yet available
Keon	Developer preview Smartphone	Firefox OS	1000	512 MB	4 GB	3.5" HVGA	3.0	Announced January 2013	Out of stock
Peak	Developer preview Smartphone	Firefox OS	1200 x2	512 MB	4 GB	4.3" qHD	8 + 2	Announced January 2013	Out of stock
Peak+	Smartphone	Firefox OS	1200 x2	1 GB	4 GB	4.3" qHD	8 + 2	Announced 2013	Not produced
Revolution	Smartphone	Firefox OS/Android	1600 x2(Intel Atom SoC Z2560 x86)	1 GB	4 GB	4.7" qHD	8 + 1.3	Announced 29 November 2013	On sale since 20 February 2014
Blackphone	Smartphone	PrivatOS	2 GHz x4	1 GB	16 GB	4.7-inch HD	8 + 5	Announced 10 January 2014	Pre-order from 24 February 2014

There were speculations that the third, yet unnamed product announced for 2011 would be a tablet computer. However, no new phones were released in 2011. Geeksphone works or has worked in the past with ODMs such as Foxconn, SIM, Cellon and Quanta. In November 2013, Geeksphone cancelled any plan for producing Peak+ citing component manufacturer problems, and announced a new model of phone called Revolution. As of 10 January 2014, the company announced a new phone called Blackphone.

== See also ==
- Google Nexus
- Galaxy Nexus
- Comparison of Firefox OS devices
