= Andreas Gal =

Hungarian software developer (born 1976)

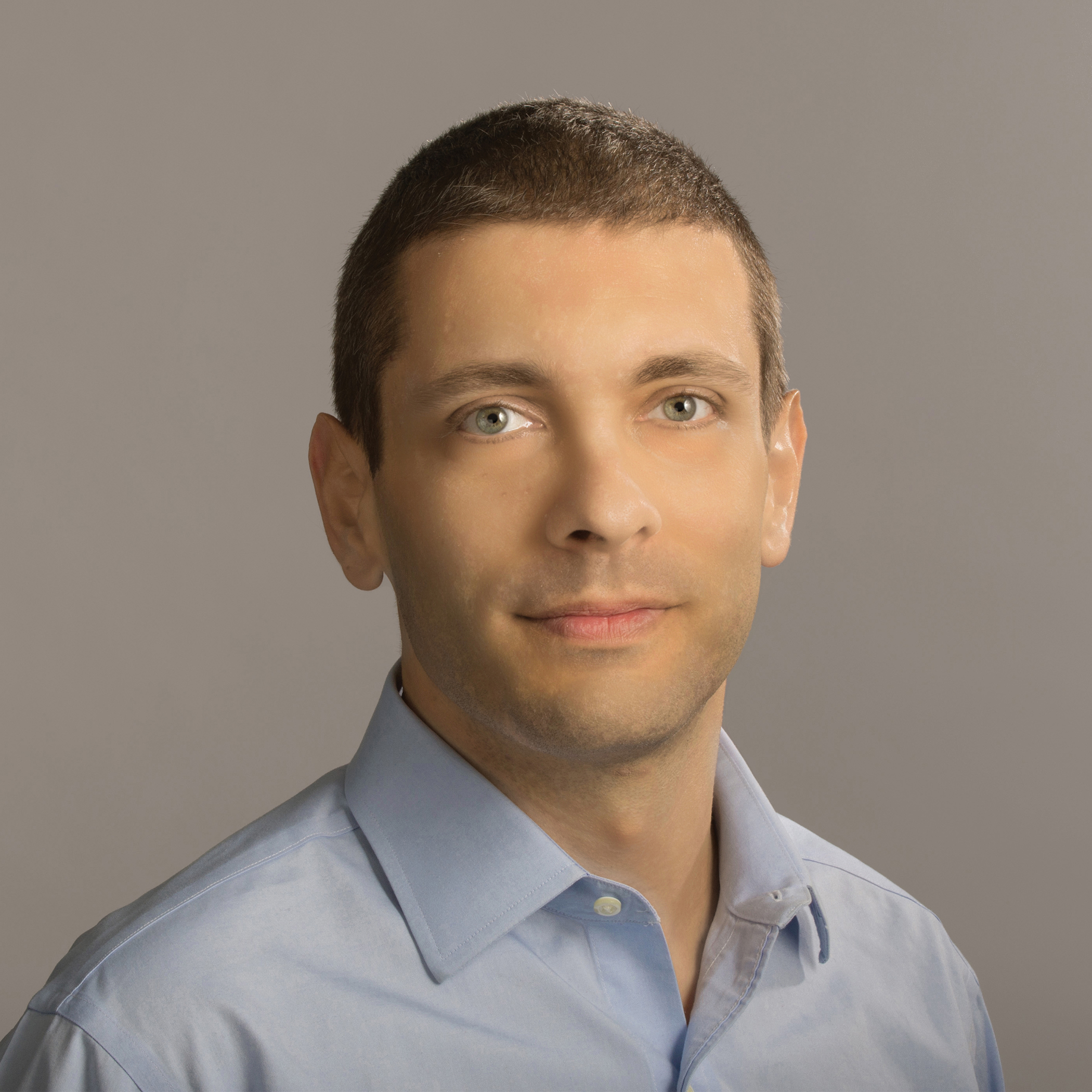
- Born: May 22, 1976 (age 50); Szeged, Hungary
- Education: University of California, Irvine
- Scientific career
- Workplaces: CEO, Silk Labs
- Thesis: Efficient Bytecode Compilation and Verification in a Virtual Machine
- Doctoral advisor: Michael Franz
- Website: andreasgal.com

Andreas Gal is former chief technology officer at Mozilla. He is most notable for his work on several open source projects and Mozilla technologies.

Gal was born in Szeged, Hungary and grew up in Lübeck, Germany. During high school he worked on various open source AX.25 network stacks and designed a routing protocol for ham radio network nodes (INP3) that became widely supported by AX.25 network routers.

During his graduate studies at the Otto-von-Guericke University Magdeburg he was a codesigner of AspectC++, an aspect-oriented extension of C and C++ languages. He later went on to obtain his Doctor of Philosophy in Computer Science at the University of California, Irvine. His thesis introduced the concept of Tracing just-in-time compilation of high-level languages using trace trees.

Gal joined Mozilla in 2008 and built TraceMonkey, the first JavaScript just-in-time compiler in a web browser, only weeks before Google announced Chrome and the V8 JavaScript engine. After his work on TraceMonkey, Gal became the Director of Research at Mozilla. A notable research project he started was PDF.js, a PDF renderer in JavaScript and HTML5, which now replaces the Adobe PDF plug-in in Firefox.

In 2011, Gal co-founded the Boot to Gecko project, which later became Firefox OS.

In 2013, Gal was appointed the Vice President of Mobile Engineering of Mozilla. In April 2014, Gal became the CTO of Mozilla. In June 2015 he left Mozilla, co-founding the Internet of Things start-up Silk Labs with two other members of the Firefox OS team (however, Silk Labs does not use Mozilla technologies). Also in 2015, Gal became an adviser at Acadine Technologies; a startup newly founded by Li Gong (former president of Mozilla Corporation) which was to develop software based on Firefox OS. As of 2018, Gal is an employee of Apple Inc.
