= GeeksPhone Peak =

Low-end smartphone released by GeeksPhone in 2013

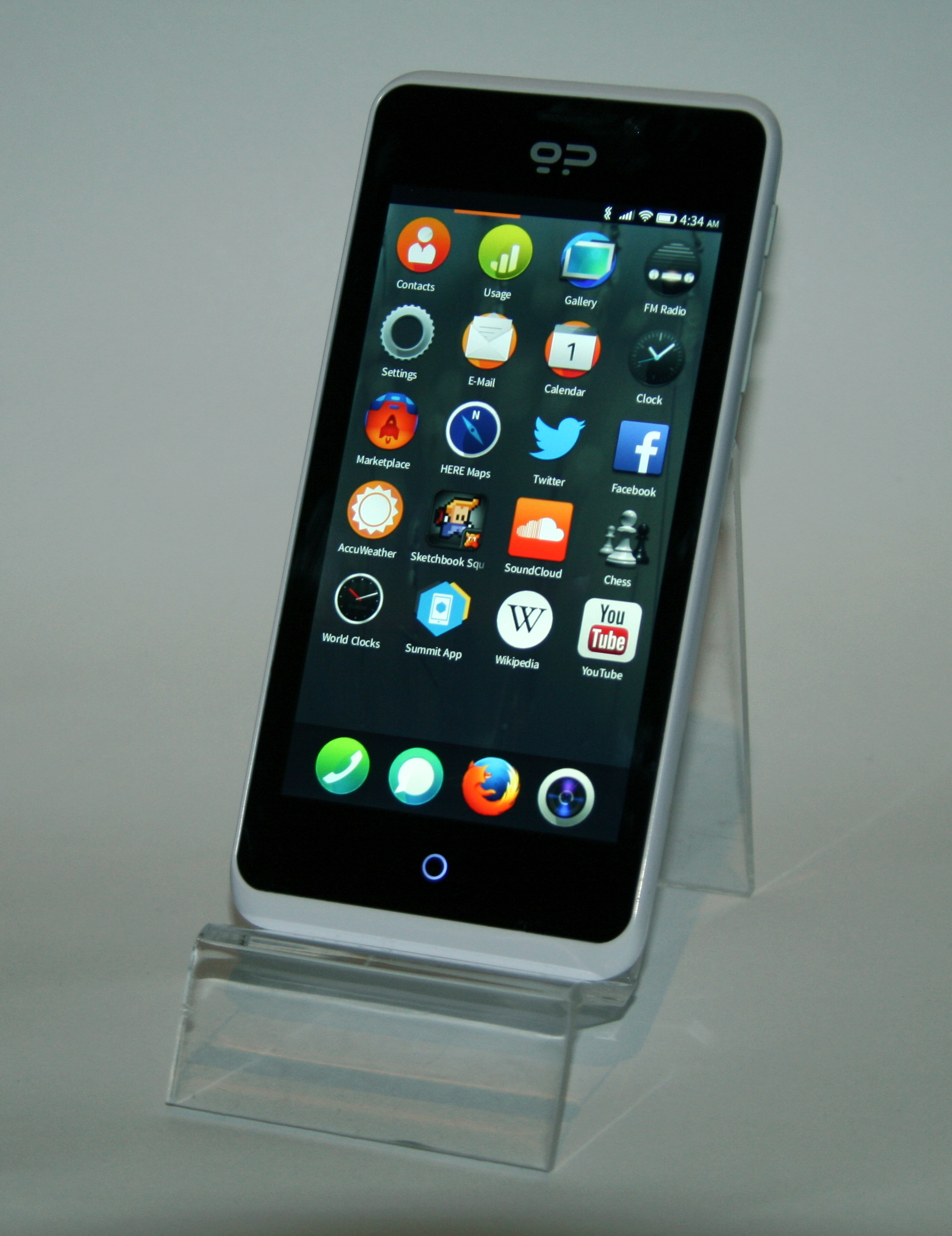
- Manufacturer: GeeksPhone
- First released: 23 April 2013
- Availability by region: 23 April 2013
- Compatible networks: GSM 850 / 900 / 1800 / 1900; HSPA (Tri-band); HSPA/UMTS 850 / 1900 / 2100
- Form factor: Bar
- Dimensions: Width: 133.6 millimetres (5.26 in); Height: 66 millimetres (2.6 in); Thickness: 8.9 millimetres (0.35 in)
- Operating system: Firefox OS
- CPU: 1.2 GHz Qualcomm Snapdragon S4 8225 processor (ARMv7)
- Memory: 512 MB
- Storage: 4 GB
- Removable storage: microSD, up to 32 GB
- Battery: 1800 mAh battery; micro-USB charging
- Rear camera: 8 MP
- Front camera: 2 MP
- Display: 540 × 960 px (qHD) capacitive touchscreen, 4.3"
- Connectivity: WLAN IEEE 802.11 a/b/g/n; Bluetooth 2.1 +EDR; micro-USB 2.0; GPS; mini-SIM card; FM receiver
- Data inputs: Capacitive multi-touch IPS display
- SAR: Head 0.56 W/kg Hotspot (1cm gap) 1.23 W/kg Body (1cm gap) 0.92 W/kg

The GeeksPhone Peak is a low-end smartphone released by GeeksPhone in April 2013. It is intended for software developers wanting to build and test mobile applications on the new Firefox OS, not for general consumers.

The Peak and the entry-level Keon are the first commercially available mobile devices running Firefox OS.

== History and availability ==
GeeksPhone Keon and Peak initially became available on 23 April 2013 and the first batch sold out in a few hours.

== Open-source ==
Unlike the lower-end GeeksPhone Keon, the Peak is not fully open source as it contains and requires some proprietary Qualcomm code.

== GeeksPhone Peak+ ==
The GeeksPhone Peak+, an improved version of the original Peak, was first announced on 16 July 2013. Unlike the original Peak, Peak+ is a customer-oriented device, which features twice the RAM of the original Peak and an added compass sensor. The Peak+ also features the same exterior dimensions as the peak.

GeeksPhone estimated that the shipping of the Peak+ devices would start in November 2013, but had some issues with material providers not meeting schedules.

Mozilla does not allow the GeeksPhone Peak+ to be called a "Firefox OS device" and insists that it should be described as a "device based on Boot to Gecko technology". It has been said that Mozilla is yet to make up its mind regarding what "Firefox OS certification" entails and that it favors its carrier supports over start-ups, such as GeeksPhone. GeeksPhone assures that despite Mozilla not wanting to support the Peak/Peak+ display resolution, the internals of Peak+ will be exactly the same as those of the original Peak, only without the Mozilla logos. The Peak + is now running a certified copy of Firefox OS 1.1.

The Geeksphone Peak+ was cancelled as of 28 November 2013.

== See also ==
- Comparison of Firefox OS devices
