= Matchstick TV =

Brand of digital media player

Matchstick TV was a project started on Kickstarter in September 2014 with the tag line "The Streaming Stick Built on Firefox OS". It was described as an "Open hardware and software platform" device built on Firefox OS and OpenFlint. The Matchstick was to work similar to the Chromecast, so the user can "fling" content from a smartphone to a Wi-Fi connected Matchstick to show the content on a TV.

The project's original completion date was February 2015 but Matchstick's controversial 2015 decision to add digital rights management (DRM) delayed and ultimately killed the product. On February 6, 2015 Matchstick announced the devices would not ship that month and would be delayed until August 2015, citing the addition of DRM as the reason for the delay. On August 3, 2015, the project officially ended due to issues implementing DRM into Firefox OS, and the Matchstick team offered refunds to the backers. Boing Boing called the decision "suicide-by-DRM," citing backers who wanted the product as originally specified without DRM. The commercial company behind the product seems to be Purplecomm, Inc. according to payment and refund information of the Amazon payment system.
