= OpenFlint =

OpenFlint is an open technology used for displaying ("casting") content from one computerized device on the display of another. Usually this would be from a smaller personal device (like a smartphone) to a device with a larger screen suitable for viewing by multiple spectators (like a TV).

== Overview ==
Development of OpenFlint was initiated in 2014 by the Matchstick project, which is a crowd-funded effort to create a miniature piece of hardware suitable for running an OpenFlint server casting to a screen through an HDMI connection. This is similar in concept to Google's Chromecast device that uses Google Cast.

The Matchstick TV devices are powered by Firefox OS, but as an open technology OpenFlint itself is not tied to any specific operating system or hardware.

As of July 2015, no consumer-grade OpenFlint-enabled products have shipped, but Matchstick developer devices have been shipping since late 2014, and the first round of devices for backers of the Matchstick Kickstarter project were expected to ship in February 2015 but were delayed until August 2015.

A demonstration OpenFlint server can be set up on an ordinary laptop or desktop computer running Linux by following instructions.

The Matchstick TV dongle project was canceled due to issues implementing DRM into Firefox OS.

== See also ==
- Android TV
