= Sony Xperia Z Ultra =

Android phablet by Sony Mobile

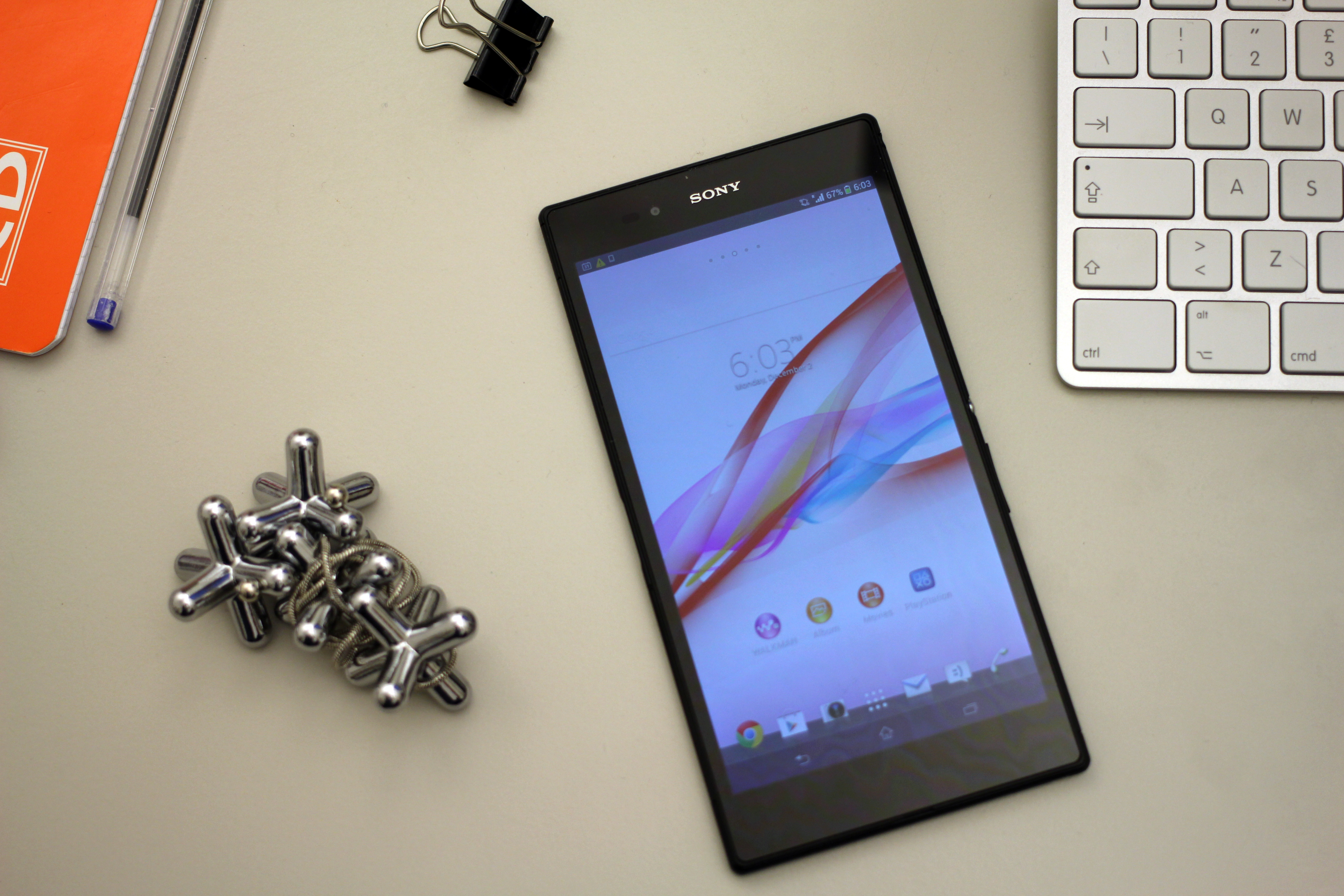
- Sony Xperia Z Ultra (model C6802)
- Brand: Sony
- Manufacturer: Sony Mobile Communications
- Type: Phablet
- Series: Sony Xperia
- First released: 24 July 2013; 13 years ago
- Availability by region: 24 July 2013; 13 years ago (India) 31 July 2013; 12 years ago (Hong Kong, Malaysia) 13 September 2013; 12 years ago (United Kingdom) 15 October 2013; 12 years ago (Canada) 10 December 2013; 12 years ago (United States, Google Play Edition) 24 January 2014; 12 years ago (Japan, SGP412 Wi-Fi only variant) 25 January 2014; 12 years ago (Japan, SOL24 variant exclusively for au by KDDI)
- Discontinued: 8 July 2014; 12 years ago (United States, Google Play Edition)
- Successor: Sony Xperia Z3 Tablet Compact (SGP412 Only); Sony Xperia XA Ultra (As a phablet)
- Related: Sony Xperia Z Sony Xperia Z1
- Compatible networks: GSM/GPRS/EDGE 850/900/1800/1900; HSPA+ 850/900/1700/1900/2100; LTE 800/850/900/1800/2100/2600 (Network specifications varies across models)
- Dimensions: 175 mm (6.9 in) H 92 mm (3.6 in) W 6.5 mm (0.26 in)
- Weight: 212 g (7.48 oz)
- Operating system: Android 4.2.2 "Jelly Bean" (launch); Android 4.3 "Jelly Bean"; Android 4.4.2 "KitKat"; Android 5.0 "Lollipop"; Android 5.1.1 "Lollipop" (current)
- System-on-chip: Qualcomm Snapdragon 800 MSM8974 2.2 GHz quad-core
- GPU: Adreno 330
- Memory: 2 GB RAM
- Storage: 16 GB (32 GB for SGP412 and SOL24 variants)
- Removable storage: up to 64 GB microSDXC
- Battery: non-user removable Li-ion 3050 mAh
- Rear camera: Sony 8.0 MP back-side illuminated sensor 1080p video recording @ 30 frames/s 16x digital zoom
- Front camera: 2.0 MP (1080p video recording)
- Display: 6.44 in (164 mm) diagonal TFT 3; 1920x1080 px (342 ppi)
- Connectivity: Wi-Fi; DLNA; Miracast; GPS/GLONASS; NFC; Bluetooth 4.0; MHL; HDMI (via MHL); micro USB 2.0 OTG: FM radio
- Codename: Togari
- SAR: 0.441 W/Kg (10g) at the ear
- Other: Available in black, purple and white IP55/IP58 (Dust protected, Water jet protected & Waterproof); 1seg (C6843 and SOL24 variants only); Osaifu-Keitai (SOL24 variant only); LISMO (SOL24 variant only); POBox Touch 6.2 (SGP412 and SOL24 variants only)

The Sony Xperia Z Ultra is a 2013 Android phablet designed and manufactured by Sony Mobile.

Codenamed Togari and marketed as "the world's slimmest Full HD smartphone it is the first phone that allows users to take notes or draw on with a regular pen or pencil.

Like the Sony Xperia Z and Z1, the phone is dust protected, low pressure water jet protected, and waterproof, allowing immersion under 1.5 metres of water for up to 30 minutes (IP55/58), as well as being shatterproof and scratch-resistant, making it the world's thinnest IP certified smartphone at the time of release.

== Design ==
The Xperia Z Ultra uses the same "Omni-Balance" design as Xperia Z. Combining tempered glass on both the front and rear with a metallic frame, the phablet is described as an "attractive-looking gadget" which has "minimalistic" yet "stylish" appeal and "premium feel".

Designed to be the same width as a passport, the device will fit normal jacket pockets. The metal frame also makes it more comfortable to hold with one hand.

Sony Xperia Z Ultra is available in three colors: black, white and purple.

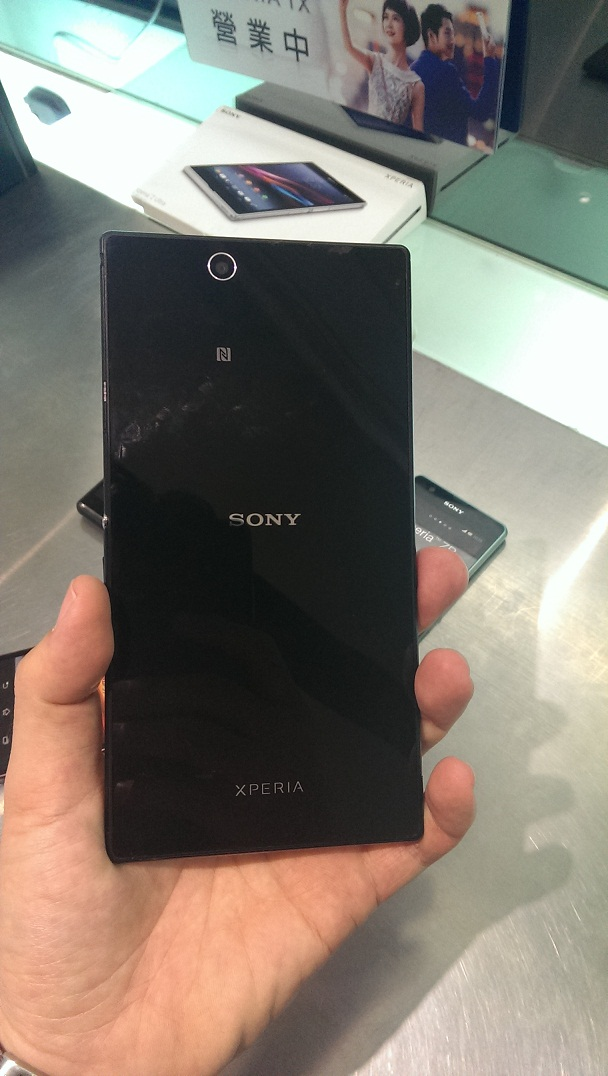
Sony Xperia Z Ultra back

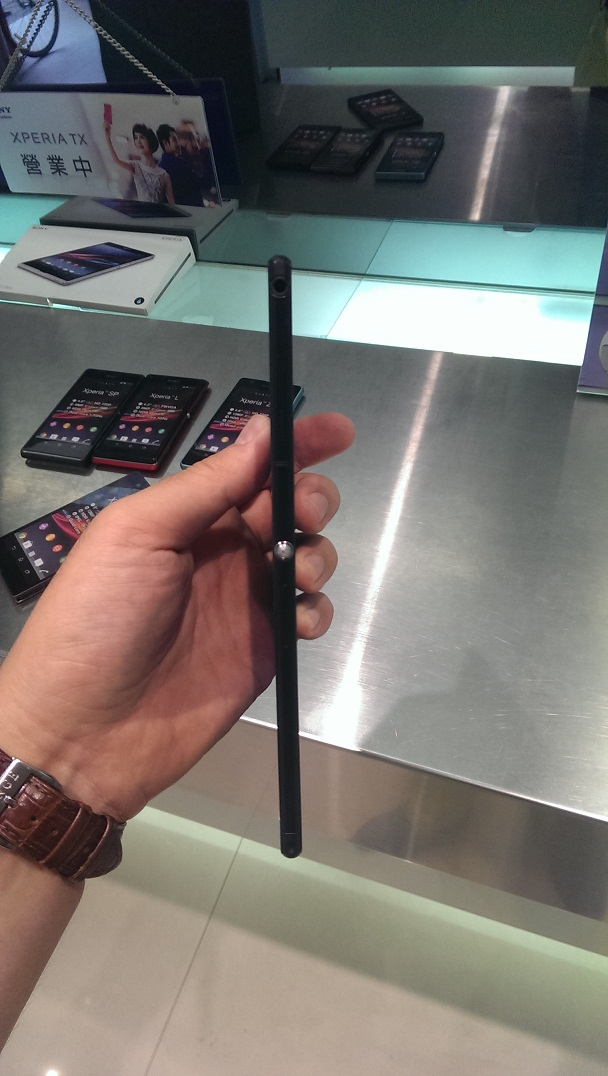
Sony Xperia Z Ultra side

== Hardware ==
The Sony Xperia Z Ultra has a 6.44" display, is slim (175 x 92 x 6.5 mm) and lightweight (212 g); it is also dust protected, low pressure water jet protected, waterproof (IP55/IP58), shatterproof and scratch-resistant. It has a 2 megapixel front camera and 8 megapixel rear camera with an Exmor R sensor, 16x digital zoom with auto focus, 1080 p HD recording, HDR, continue burst mode, face detection.FM RADIO with stereo.

On the inside, the Z Ultra is first smartphone announced with the Qualcomm Snapdragon 800 quad-core processor. It comes with a sealed 3050 mAh Lithium polymer battery, 2 GB RAM, 16 GB of flash storage, and also has a microSD card slot (up to 128 GB). For connectivity, the phone has LTE, Bluetooth 4.0, NFC, Wi-Fi and screen mirroring.

Sony will also release a Smart Bluetooth Headset (SBH52) that allows answering calls without taking the phablet out, as well as reading call logs and text messages, listening to music and FM radio. The headset has NFC for single-touch pairing with Xperia Z Ultra, and it is also water-resistant.

== Features ==
The 6.44" Full HD (1080p) 342 ppi touchscreen display uses Sony's Triluminos™ and X-Reality for mobile technology, with an OptiContrast panel to reduce reflection and enable clearer viewing even in bright sunlight. The screen is highly responsive and compatible with stylus as well as regular pencils or metal pens.

Being waterproof means that users can use the phablet in the rain, or take it to the pool or beach. Although lacking a rear LED flash, the phone's cameras are capable of taking pictures/videos at any light and even underwater.

The Xperia Z Ultra was originally shipped with Sony's custom version of Android 4.2.2, and as of 27 June 2014, the Xperia Z Ultra has received the Android 4.4.4 (KitKat) update. In addition to Sony's own applications like Walkman, PlayStation Mobile, battery stamina mode, several Google apps also come preloaded (Google Chrome, Google Play, Google Voice Search, Google Maps, NeoReader™ barcode scanner). On 2 November 2014, the Xperia Z Ultra Google Play Edition received an update to Android 5.0 Lollipop.

On 4 December 2015, the international version of the Xperia Z Ultra received the Android 5.1.1 update from Sony.

Because of its size, the phone's on-screen keyboard and dialer can be switched to either sides for users to easily reach all keys with only the thumb.

For gaming, DualShock 3 is natively supported.

C6843 variant with 1seg TV tuner is sold in Brazil.

== Variants ==
Model	FCC id	Carriers/regions	GSM bands	UMTS bands	LTE bands	Notes
C6802/XL39h	PY7PM-0530	Worldwide	Quad	Penta	N/A	
C6806	PY7PM-0430	North America	Quad	Penta	1, 2, 4, 5, 7, 8, 17	Google Play Edition
C6833	PY7PM-0410	Worldwide	Quad	Penta	1, 2, 3, 4, 5, 7, 8, 20	
C6843	PY7PM-0620	Brazil	Quad	Penta	1, 2, 3, 4, 5, 7, 8, 20	
SOL24	PY7PM-0700	au by KDDI (Japan)	Quad	CDMA JP 800 (BC0), 2100 (BC6); UMTS Bands 1, 2, 5	1, 3, 11, 18	

All variants (except SOL24) support four 2G GSM bands 850/900/1800/1900 and five 3G UMTS band 850/900/1700/1900/2100.

== Reception ==
Sony Xperia Z Ultra was praised for its exterior design, large Triluminos display, slim form, light weight, build quality, durability (water- and dustproof qualities), pencil/pen compatibility, and technical specs.

CNET's editor Aloysius Low wrote that "Sony has set a very high benchmark with the Xperia Z Ultra", challenging the leadership position in the phablet market.

PhoneArena wrote that the Xperia Z Ultra is "an engineering marvel" "towering above all other phablets not only in screen size, but also in specs and design". Its performance is described as "blazing fast", claimed to be the "fastest mobile device they've tested so far" (as of 13 August 2013). According to ExpertReviews, the Xperia Z Ultra is "more than twice as fast as a Galaxy S4".

== See also ==
- Sony Xperia Z series

Preceded by None	Sony Xperia Z Ultra(SGP412); 2013	Succeeded by Sony Xperia Z3 Tablet Compact
