= Acadine Technologies =

Defunct software company

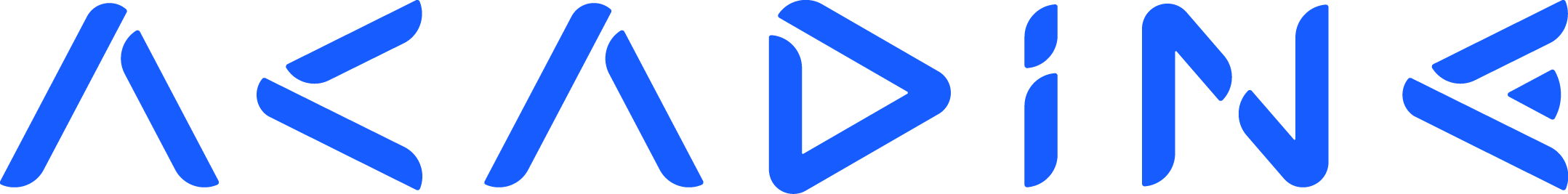
- Company type: Private
- Founded: March 25, 2015
- Headquarters: Hong Kong
- Key people: Li Gong (Chairman and CEO)
- Products: H5OS
- Number of employees: 120+ (December 2015)
- Website: www.acadine.com Dead link, latest Web Archive link (web.archive.org/web/20180310043517/http://www.acadine.com/)

Acadine Technologies Holdings Limited was a systems software company specializing in mobile operating systems for mobile, wearable, and Internet of Things (IoT) devices. Its core product was H5OS, a web-centric operating system that was primarily based on the open web standard HTML5. It was derived from Firefox OS, whose development company founder Li Gong had overseen as president of Mozilla Corporation.

Acadine Technologies was founded on March 25, 2015, and was based in Hong Kong with operations in Beijing, Taipei, Palo Alto, and London. Initially started under the name "Gone Fishing", the startup recruited various staff from Mozilla apart from Gong, including James Ho, former Mozilla CTO Andreas Gal and employees of Mozilla Taiwan. When Mozilla announced in December 2015 that it would cease its efforts to partner with mobile carriers to use Firefox OS on smartphones, it was reported that Acadine would take over this mission with H5OS. It released the first version of H5OS on 17th Feb 2016.

It was announced on July 15, 2015 that Acadine Technologies would receive $100M in first-round funding from Tsinghua Unigroup International, a Hong Kong entity controlled by Tsinghua University and the Chinese government. In the same year, Li Gong stated that the company was already seeking a second round of funding from international investors, a main rationale being "to dispel very early the incorrect perception that we are somehow a China-backed company. We are really a pure Silicon Valley-style startup".

On April 27, 2016, it was reported that the funds from Tsinghua Unigroup were not being transferred and Acadine started a reorganization.

H5OS was discontinued in May 2016, and was never publicly released.
