= GeeksPhone One =

Android smartphone

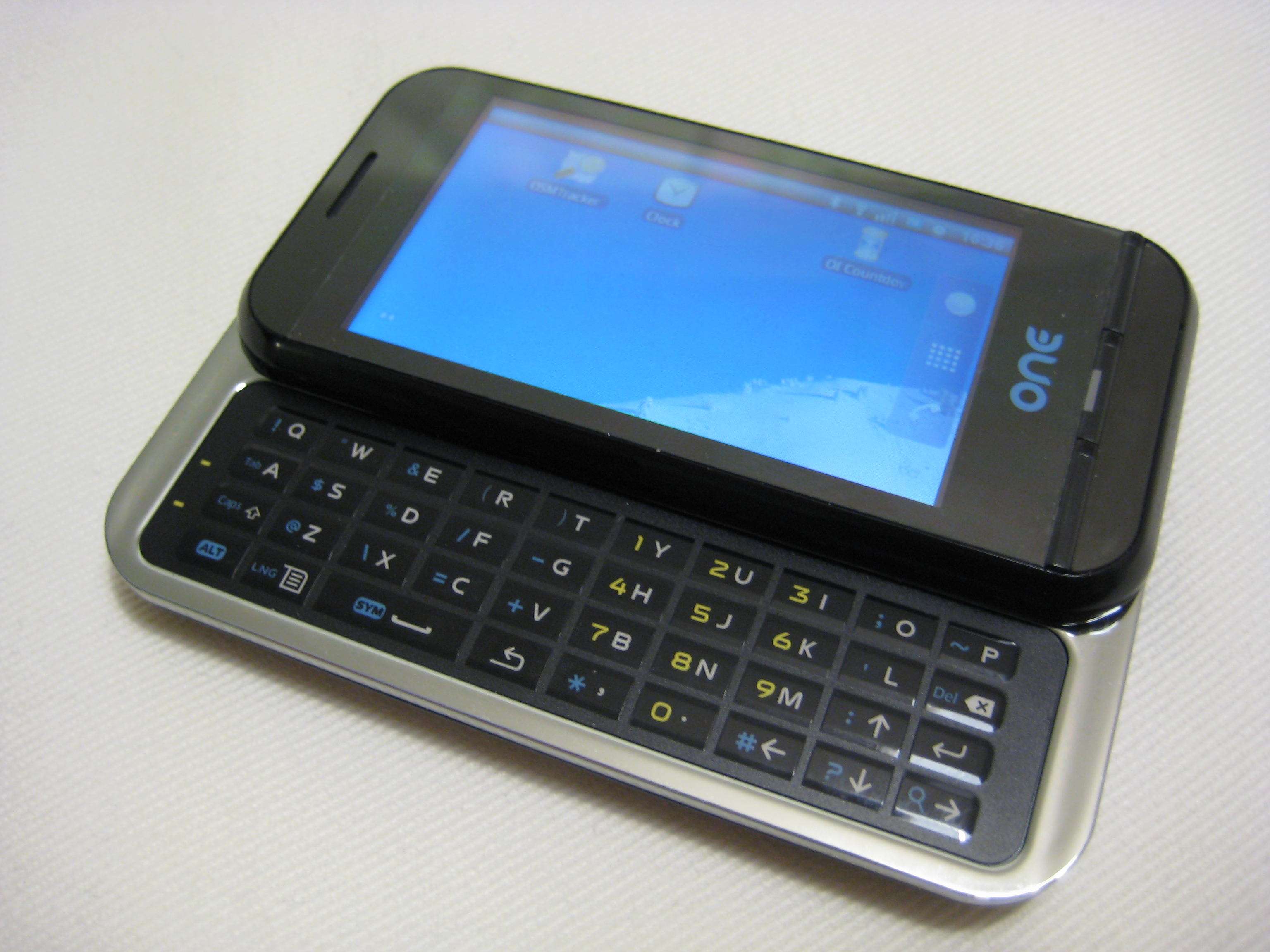
- Manufacturer: GeeksPhone
- Type: Smartphone
- Availability by region: 2010
- Dimensions: 110 × 55 × 14 (mm)
- Operating system: Android 1.6 “Donut”
- CPU: 528 MHz ARM11 (ARM1136EJ-S) Jazelle series
- Memory: 256 MB mDDR; 512 MB NAND flash
- Battery: 1110 mAh 3.7V Li-Po battery
- Rear camera: 3.1 Megapixels with autofocus
- Display: 3.2 in. WQVGA (240×400) TFT
- Media: microSD, SDHC capable
- Connectivity: GSM 850/900/1800/1900; Bluetooth 2.0; GPRS; HSDPA; AGPS; WiFi (802.11 b/g); USB
- Data inputs: Touchscreen; 5 hardware buttons Volume slider
- Codename: One

The GeeksPhone One is an Android-powered smartphone developed and marketed by GeeksPhone. It was aimed at power users; GeeksPhone claimed it to be the first Android phone which is not locked down but gives users full access to the operating system and even encourages modifying it. The device was originally priced at €300 in the EU, lowered to €160 in December 2010.

== Hardware ==
- GPS with DGPS (WAAS/EGNOS)
- 3-axis accelerometer
- Retractile stylus

Hardware specifications of the One were changed at various stages after its announcement:

- The original prototype looked similar to the Samsung Omnia and lacked a physical keyboard, the final design was adopted later.
- A DVB-T tuner, although initially announced, is not found in the final product.
- A second, front-facing camera for use in video calls was also mentioned before the release and is clearly visible next to the earpiece in photos of prototypes, although reportedly disabled in initial software releases. The final product lacks this second camera.
- The first releases were shipped with 256 MB ROM; later models are equipped with 512 MB.

== Software ==
The GeeksPhone One originally shipped with a customized build of Android 1.6 “Donut”; updates to later Android versions are available. The system image also includes closed-source Android components, as well as some commercial third-party applications.

== Philosophy ==
The GeeksPhone One is the first handset produced by GeeksPhone. The company claimed it to be the first Android-powered handset which allows the user to modify operating system components without having to root the device first. New OS images could easily be installed on the device; the company operated a wiki and a forum for users to share knowledge. However, unlike similar efforts such as Openmoko, GeeksPhone did not publish details on the phone's hardware beyond common technical specifications.

Another difference to Openmoko is that GeeksPhone aimed to provide a stable device suitable for everyday use and capable of competing with other commercial devices on the market. The GeeksPhone One shipped with an Android version which had undergone quality tests and passed Android Open Source Project (AOSP) Code Compliance certification, allowing it to include closed-source Android components and participate in Android Market.

As of July 2010, the GeeksPhone was not available through any of the big mobile operators. While GeeksPhone did not rule out cooperation with operators, CEO Javier Agüera stated that the “freedom-based” business model would have priority over any such agreement.

== Certified Community Release program ==
In July 2010, GeeksPhone announced their Certified Community Release (CCR) program. CCRs were Android ports developed by the community and subsequently certified by GeeksPhone. Releases could be certified as “stable” or “beta”. While full credit was given to the developer, GeeksPhone gave technical support to users of these builds and flashed phones with a CCR if requested by the customer. Use of a CCR did not void the warranty of the phone.

Developers could get technical support from GeeksPhone and major contributors could receive an additional free handset for development from GeeksPhone and, in some cases, sponsorships.

GeeksPhone initially announced that phones would not yet ship with CCRs preinstalled; however, as of at least October 2010, phones had been shipped with a CCR based on Android 2.2 (Froyo).

== Market availability and clones ==
GeeksPhone sold the One in Europe and Latin America. In Russia, computer discounter Vobis distributed the GeeksPhone One under the name Highscreen Zeus, apparently with a different software package than the original GeeksPhone One. In Taiwan and Hong Kong, it was marketed by Far EasTone under the name Commtiva Z1, with a Chinese keyboard.

The Acer neoTouch P300 appears to have identical hardware but runs Windows Mobile.

== See also ==
- Google Nexus
- Galaxy Nexus
