= Linaro =

Engineering organization for open source software

- Founded: June 3, 2010; 16 years ago
- Type: Engineering organization
- VAT ID no.: 990027324
- Registration no.: 07180318
- Purpose: Open-source software for the ARM architecture
- Location: Harston Mill, Harston, Cambridge, CB22 7GG, United Kingdom
- Members: 13
- Key people: Li Gong; Grant Likely; Rob Booth; Tim Benton
- Website: linaro.org

Linaro Limited is an engineering organization that works on free and open-source software such as the Linux kernel, the GNU Compiler Collection (GCC), QEMU, power management, graphics and multimedia interfaces for the ARM family of instruction sets and implementations thereof as well as for the Heterogeneous System Architecture (HSA). The company provides a collaborative engineering forum for companies to share engineering resources and funding to solve common problems on ARM software. In addition to Linaro's collaborative engineering forum, Linaro also works with companies on a one-to-one basis through its Services division.

Linaro works on software that is close to the silicon such as kernel, multimedia, power management, graphics and security. The company aims to provide stable, tested tools and code for multiple software distributions to use to reduce low-level fragmentation of embedded Linux software. It also provides engineering and investment in upstream open source projects and support to silicon companies in upstreaming code to be used with their systems-on-a-chip (SoC). Since the 3.10 Linux kernel release, Linaro has consistently been listed in the top ten contributors to the Linux kernel.

Every year, Linaro hosts Linaro Connect - an engineering conference, where leading hardware and software companies in the ARM ecosystem come together to collaborate, hack and develop technical road maps and strategy.

== History ==
Initial discussions and hires to the organization were done under the project name NewCo or NewCore early 2010.

The founding of Linaro was announced at Computex in June 2010 by ARM, Freescale Semiconductor, IBM, Samsung, ST-Ericsson, and Texas Instruments in a joint press conference. Linaro was formed to provide "new resources and industry alignment for open source software developers using Linux on the world's most sophisticated semiconductor System-on-Chips (SoCs)." Since its formation, Linaro has continued to deliver tools, security and Linux kernel quality to the ARM ecosystem as a whole. In addition, the company has created groups tasked with addressing fragmentation in the following market segments: Consumer Devices, Datacenter & Cloud, Edge & Fog Computing and Windows on Arm.

In 2012, Linaro formed the Linaro Datacenter & Cloud Group (formerly known as the Linaro Enterprise Group) to drive adoption of ARM in the server market. In February 2013, Linaro launched the Linaro Networking Group. This group went on to start the OpenDataPlane initiative which "defined a set of APIs to be used across the full range of processor architectures and networking offloads available". In 2018, project governance of the OpenDataPlane project was moved to the Openfastpath Foundation.

In February 2014, Linaro formed the Linaro Security Working group to "create open source Android and Linux reference designs for Trusted execution environment (TEE) technology." Shortly after its formation, the Security Working Group took over project governance of (Open Portable Trusted Execution Environment), initially a proprietary TEE project developed by ST-Ericsson. In May 2014, Linaro launched the Linaro Digital Home Group, focused on ARM-based media gateways and STBs (Set Top Boxes). A few months later in July 2014, the Linaro Consumer Group (formerly known as the Linaro Mobile Group) was formed to consolidate and optimize open source software for mobile platforms on ARM.

In 2015, Linaro launched 96Boards, a specification created with the aim of delivering compatible low cost, small footprint 32-bit and 64-bit Cortex-A boards. In 2016, Linaro launched the Linaro IoT and Embedded Group, with the aim of developing "end-to-end open source reference software for IoT devices and applications."

In 2018, Linaro restructured the engineering groups to align with the technological landscape. As a result, the Linaro Networking Group and the Linaro Digital Home Group were both disbanded and the Linaro Edge & Fog Computing Group created. In 2019, Li Gong was appointed Linaro CEO.

In 2021, Linaro launched Oniro OS project based on OpenAtom Foundation OpenHarmony, which is an open-source HarmonyOS operating system, with other founding members Serco, Array, Huawei and others in cooperation with Eclipse Foundation.

In 2022, Linaro launched the Windows on Arm Group together with Arm, Microsoft and Qualcomm.

In 2023, Linaro acquired Arm Forge - a suite of debug and performance analysis tools which can be used across multiple compute architectures for server and HPC applications. Arm Forge is now known as Linaro Forge. In 2023, Linaro also disbanded the Linaro IoT & Embedded Group, declaring mission accomplished for having achieved maturity of open source projects supporting Arm-based MCUs in the IoT space.

== Engineering activities ==
=== Core technologies ===
Linaro's Core Engineering Team is focused on co-maintaining the ARM ecosystem. The team works directly with upstream projects supporting core technologies including Linux kernel core features, power management, security, toolchain support (both GCC and LLVM), testing and CI and Virtualization. It makes regular public releases along with a number of reference builds of kernels and userspace for various Linux distributions (including Android and Ubuntu) on member SoCs.

The Core Engineering team also maintains the automated testing system called LAVA (Linaro Automated Validation Architecture) which Linaro developed. LAVA is for automated testing of the open source components that are used in the major Linux-based software platforms. A lab running LAVA and a wide variety of ARM hardware is run for the use of Linaro and member company engineers.

=== Segment specific engineering ===
The remaining work done by Linaro is split into groups focusing on particular markets where ARM processors are used. These include:

==== Linaro Consumer Group ====
The Linaro Consumer Group focuses on development for mobile devices, such as smartphones and tablets. The primary aim of the group is to improve the AOSP ecosystem through collaborative activities that benefit members across all Android use cases.

==== Linaro Datacenter & Cloud Group ====
The Linaro Datacenter & Cloud Group focuses on Linux development for ARM servers. The team's mission is to bring competing companies together to work on common solutions to problems and enable OEM's, commercial Linux providers and System on Chip (SOC) vendors to collaborate in a neutral environment on the development of the core software needed by the rapidly emerging market for low-power hyperscale servers.

==== Linaro Edge & Fog Computing Group ====
The Linaro Edge & Fog Computing Group is working to accelerate the adoption of ARM technologies in Edge & Fog Computing ecosystems.

==== Linaro Windows on Arm Group ====
In February 2022 Linaro formed the Windows on Arm Group together with Arm, CIX Technology, Microsoft and Qualcomm. The group is aiming to build an ecosystem for Windows on Arm that supports native development.

=== 96Boards ===
96Boards is an open platform specification that provides a platform for the delivery of compatible low-cost, small footprint 32-bit and 64-bit Cortex-A boards.

A fixed set of minimum interfaces are required by the specifications, for example the Consumer Edition (CE) specification requires standard USB, micro-SD, HDMI, power, and low- and high-speed peripheral connectors. Vendors may add customized hardware and feature sets provided the form factor and minimum set of interfaces are supported. Since the original Consumer Edition (CE) release there have been specifications for Enterprise (EE), IoT (IE) and SoM developed.

On April 27, 2017, a board adhering to the 96Board Consumer Edition Open Standard became a development platform for the Android Open Source Project (AOSP).

==== Specifications and implementations ====
There are four published 96Boards specifications for low-cost ARMv7-A and ARMv8-A development boards:

- The Consumer Edition (CE) targets the mobile, embedded and digital home segments.
- The Enterprise Edition (EE) targets the networking and server segments.
- The Internet of Things Edition (IE) is designed to support development in the IoT space.
- The SoM Edition (SoM) is focused on Wireless and Compute solutions.
