= Comparison of Firefox OS devices =

Firefox OS is an operating system for use on certain specific mobile devices. This page lists and compares hardware devices that are supplied with a Firefox OS operating system.

== Devices ==
=== Smartphones ===
brand (maker)	product	release date	Firefox OS version	resolution (pixel)	display size	system on chip	random- access memory	data storage	rear camera (Mpx)	front camera (Mpx)	battery (mAh)	expansion slot	wireless network protocols
Alcatel (TCL)	One Touch; Fire	2013–07	1.0.1-1.3	320×480; HVGA	3.5 inches (8.9 cm)	Qualcomm Snapdragon S1 'MSM7227A' (single-core ARM Cortex-A5 1.0 GHz & Adreno 200)	256 MB	512 MB	3.2	—N/a	1,400	2 GB, up to 32 GB	3G, Wi-Fi, Bluetooth 3.0
Alcatel (TCL)	One Touch; Fire C	2014–04	1.3.0	320×480; HVGA	3.5 inches (8.9 cm)	Qualcomm Snapdragon 200 'MSM8610' (dual-core ARM ARMv7 Cortex A7 1.2 GHz & Adreno 302)	512 MB	4 GB	3.0/2.0	—N/a	1,300	up to 32 GB	3G, Wi-Fi, Bluetooth
Alcatel (TCL)	One Touch; Fire E	2014–07	1.3.0-2.0	540×960 qHD	4.5 inches (11.4 cm)	Qualcomm Snapdragon 200 'MSM8610' (dual-core ARM ARMv7 Cortex A7 1.2 GHz & Adreno 302	512 MB	4 GB	5, LED flash	0.3	1,700	up to 32 GB	3G, Wi-Fi, Bluetooth
Alcatel (TCL)	One Touch; Fire S	cancelled	2.0.0 (2.1 with FOTA)	540×960 qHD	4.5 inches (11.4 cm)	quad-core 1.2 GHz	1 GB	4 GB	5	2	2,000		
Alcatel (TCL)	Fire C 2G	2014–10	1.3.0	320×480; HVGA	3.5 inches (8.9 cm) (165ppi)	Spreadtrum SC6821 1 GHz	128 MB	256 MB	0.3	—N/a	1,000		2G
Alcatel (TCL)	Flame by Alcatel	2014–04	1.3	480×854; FWVGA	4.5 inches (11.4 cm)	Qualcomm Snapdragon 200 'MSM8210' (dual-core ARM Cortex-A7 1.2 GHz & Adreno 302)	256 MB - 1 GB (depending on model)	8 GB	5	2	1,800		
Alcatel (TCL)	Alcatel Orange Klif	2015–05	2.0	320×480	3.5 inches (8.9 cm)	MediaTek dual-core 1.0 GHz	256 MB	512 MB	2.0, LED flash		1,300	up to 32 GB	3G, Wi-Fi, Bluetooth
GeeksPhone	Keon	2013–04	1.0.1	320×480; HVGA	3.5 inches (8.9 cm)	Qualcomm Snapdragon S1 'MSM7225AB'	512 MB	4 GB	3	—N/a	1,580		
GeeksPhone	Peak	2013–04	1.0.1	540×960 qHD	4.3 inches (10.9 cm)	Qualcomm Snapdragon S4 'MSM8225' dual-core	512 MB	4 GB	8	2	1,800		
GeeksPhone	Peak+	cancelled	1.1.0	540×960 qHD	4.3 inches (10.9 cm)	Qualcomm Snapdragon S4 'MSM8225' dual-core	1 GB	4 GB	8	2	1,800		
GeeksPhone	Revolution	2014–02	2.0.0.0 (boot.img locked and support ended)/Android 4.2.2	540×960 qHD	4.7 inches (11.9 cm)	Atom Z2560 1.6 GHz dual-core	1 GB	4 GB	8	2	2,000		
Huawei	Y300II	2014–10	1.1.0	480×800; WVGA	4.0 inches (10.2 cm)	Qualcomm Snapdragon S4 'MSM8225' dual-core	512 MB	4 GB	5	3	?		
Intex	Intex Cloud FX (Cherry Mobile Ace)	2014–10	1.3.0	320×480; HVGA	3.5 inches (8.9 cm)	Spreadtrum SC6821 1 GHz	128 MB	256 MB	2	—N/a	1,250, 1,100 (Ace)		2G
KDDI	KDDI Fx0	2014–12	2.0	1280×720; HD (720p)	4.7 inches (11.9 cm)	Qualcomm Snapdragon 400 'MSM8926' 1.2 GHz quad-core	1.5 GB	16 GB	8	2.1	2,370	up to 64 GB	3G, Wi-Fi, Bluetooth, NFC
LG	LG Fireweb	2013–10	1.1.0	320×480; HVGA	4.0 inches (10.2 cm)	Qualcomm Snapdragon S1 'MSM7227A' (single-core ARM Cortex-A5 1.0 GHz & Adreno 200)	512 MB	4 GB	5	—N/a	1,540		
SpiceFire	One Mi FX1	2014–08	1.3.0	320×480; HVGA	3.5 inches (8.9 cm)	unknown 1 GHz	128 MB	256 MB	1.3	0.3	1,400		
SpiceFire	One Mi-FX 2	2015–05	1.4	320×480; HVGA	3.5 inches (8.9 cm)	single-core 1.0 GHz	256 MB	512 MB	2.0, LED flash	1.3	1,100	up to 32 GB	3G, Wi-Fi, Bluetooth
Symphony	Symphony GoFox F15	2014–08	1.4	320×480; HVGA	3.5 inches (8.9 cm)	single-core 1.0 GHz	512 MB	512 MB	3.2	0.3	1,450		
Zen	U105 Fire	tbc	1.3	320×480; HVGA	3.5 inches (8.9 cm)	Spreadtrum SC6821 1 GHz	128 MB	256 MB	2.0, LED flash	0.3 (VGA)	1,200	up to 16 GB	2G (EDGE), Wi-Fi, Bluetooth
ZTE	ZTE Open	2013–07	1.0.1 (upgradable to 1.1 or 1.2-beta)	320×480; HVGA	3.5 inches (8.9 cm)	Qualcomm Snapdragon S1 'MSM7225A'	256 MB	512 MB	3.2	—N/a	1,200		
ZTE	ZTE Open C	2014–03	1.3.0 (upgradable up to 3.0-nightly	480×800; WVGA	4.0 inches (10.2 cm)	Qualcomm Snapdragon 200 'MSM8210' (dual-core ARM Cortex-A7 1.2 GHz & Adreno 302)	512 MB	4 GB	3	—N/a	1,400		
ZTE	ZTE Open II	2014–06	1.3	320×480; HVGA	3.5 inches (8.9 cm)	Qualcomm Snapdragon 200 'MSM8210' (dual-core ARM Cortex-A7 1.2 GHz & Adreno 302)	256 MB	2 GB	2.0	—N/a	1,150		
ZTE	ZTE Open L	2015–03	2.2	480×854; FWVGA	5.0 inches (12.7 cm)	quad-core 1.1 GHz Cortex-A7	1 GB	8 GB	5	2	2,200		

=== Tablet computer ===
brand (maker)	name	release date	Firefox OS version	resolution	display size	system on chip	random- access memory	data storage	rear camera (Mpx)	front camera (Mpx)	battery (mAh)
Foxconn	InFocus New Tab F1	(community testing only)		1280×800	10.1 inches (25.7 cm)	Allwinner A31 (quad-core ARM Cortex A7@1.2 GHz & PowerVR SGX544MP2)	2 GB	16 GB	5	2	7,000
VIA	VIA Vixen	(community testing only)		1024×600	7.0 inches (17.8 cm)	WonderMedia WM8880 (dual-core ARM Cortex A9@1.2 GHz & ARM Mali-400MP2)	1 GB	8 GB	2	0.3 (VGA)	4,000
Alcatel Mobile (TCL)	Alcatel One Touch Fire 7	2014–Q3	1.3.0	540×960 qHD	7.0 inches (17.8 cm)	dual-core 1.2 GHz	2 GB	4 GB	0.3 (VGA)	0.3 (VGA)	?

=== Other devices ===
maker / brand	name	release date	version	notes
VIA Technologies	APC Paper	2014–01–06	1.03.01 for APC	single-board computer
VIA Technologies	APC Rock	2014–01–06	1.03.01 for APC	single-board computer
Panasonic	Panasonic CX700	2015–05	?	Smart TV, 4K Ultra HD TV 3840 x 2160p, Firefox web browser

== See also ==
- List of open-source mobile phones
