= Li Gong (computer scientist) =

Chinese computer scientist

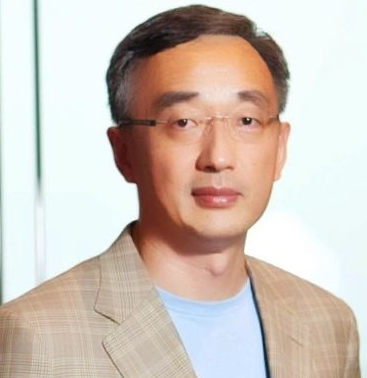
- Born: 1963 (age 62–63); Beijing, China
- Education: University of Cambridge (PhD); Tsinghua University (B.S. & M.S.)
- Occupations: Businessman, computer scientist
- Title: CEO of Linaro Ltd.
- Website: twitter.com/ligongsv

Gong Li (simplified Chinese: 宫力; traditional Chinese: 宮力; pinyin: Gōng Lì), also known in English as Li Gong, is a Chinese businessman and computer scientist. He is CEO of Linaro, a British software company headquartered in Cambridge, UK, developing systems software for the Arm ecosystem. He was previously the founder and CEO of Acadine Technologies, a systems software company specializing in mobile operating systems for mobile, wearable, and IoT devices. Acadine's core product H5OS was a web-centric operating system that was primarily based on the open web standard HTML5. It was derived from Firefox OS, whose development Li had overseen as president of Mozilla Corporation.

== Education ==
Born and raised in Beijing, Gong obtained B.S./M.S. at Tsinghua University, Beijing, and a PhD at the University of Cambridge, UK, all in computer science.

== Academic achievements ==
Li Gong has 22 issued US patents and co-authored three books (published by Addison Wesley and O'Reilly), many technical articles, and 8 general articles in the science journal Nature. He won the Best Paper Award at the 1989 IEEE Symposium on Security and Privacy, and received the 1994 Leonard G. Abraham Prize given by the IEEE Communications Society for "the most significant contribution to technical literature in the field of interest of the IEEE."

== Career ==
Li Gong started his career as a researcher, primarily in the fields of computer systems, networking, and information security. He was both program chair and general conference chair for ACM CCS, IEEE S&P, and IEEE CSFW. He was associate editor of ACM TISSEC and associate editor-in-chief of IEEE Internet Computing. Before going into the industry, he first worked at Odyssey Research in Ithaca, New York, and later at the Computer Science Laboratory at SRI International in Menlo Park, California. He held visiting positions at Cornell and Stanford and was a guest chair professor at Tsinghua University, Beijing.

In 1996, he joined the JavaSoft division at Sun Microsystems (in Cupertino, California) as chief Java security architect and designed the security architecture of the Java platform. He became a distinguished engineer and later headed engineering for Java Embedded Server and JXTA, and was the founding chair of the Java Expert Group at the international standard organization OSGi and led the OSGi 1.0 specification.

In 2001, he founded the Sun Microsystems Engineering and Research Institute (ERI) in China, where he was general manager and led the team working on Solaris system, browser, OpenOffice and related desktop software research and development.

In 2005, he joined Microsoft as general manager to lead MSN in China and served as vice president of the Microsoft China R&D Group. He led Beijing and Shanghai teams working in many areas across all the services MSN offered — including Messenger, Hotmail, Spaces, Safety, Mobile, Search, Ads platform, and Virtual Earth.

In 2007, Gong joined Mozilla Corporation to found its China subsidiary Mozilla Online Ltd where he was chairman and CEO. Four years later, he founded Mozilla Taiwan and was CEO. Later, he worked in a number of executive roles at Mozilla's headquarters, including senior vice president of mobile devices, president of Asia operations, chief operating officer, and president.

He left Mozilla in April 2015, and started Acadine Technologies, initially under the name "Gone Fishing". It was announced on July 15, 2015 that Acadine Technologies received $100M of first-round funding from Tsinghua Unigroup International, a Hong Kong entity controlled by Tsinghua University and the Chinese government. In the same year, Li Gong stated that the company was already seeking a second round of funding from international investors, a main rationale being "to dispel very early the incorrect perception that we are somehow a China-backed company. We are really a pure Silicon Valley-style startup".

Li participated (as co-founder, investor, and advisor) in a number of startups in the Silicon Valley and in China. He was venture partner and head of the China office for the US venture capital firm Bessemer Venture Partners from 2007 to 2009.

== Awards ==
Li was named one of the 2003 China New Economy People by China Internet Weekly and Sina.com, and received the China Open Source Movement Leadership Award in 2003 given by the China Software Industry Association. In 2013 he was named a "China Outstanding Open Source Contributor" by the China Open Source Software Promotion Union, and one of the top 100 managers in China by the Chinese management magazine Manager Today.

He is a long-term member on the board of directors of the Tsinghua University Alumni Association and co-founded Tsinghua Entrepreneur and Executive Club (TEEC) and was the founding Chairman of Beijing chapter of TEEC in 2008.
