= Sony Xperia Z3 Tablet Compact =

Android tablet by Sony Xperia

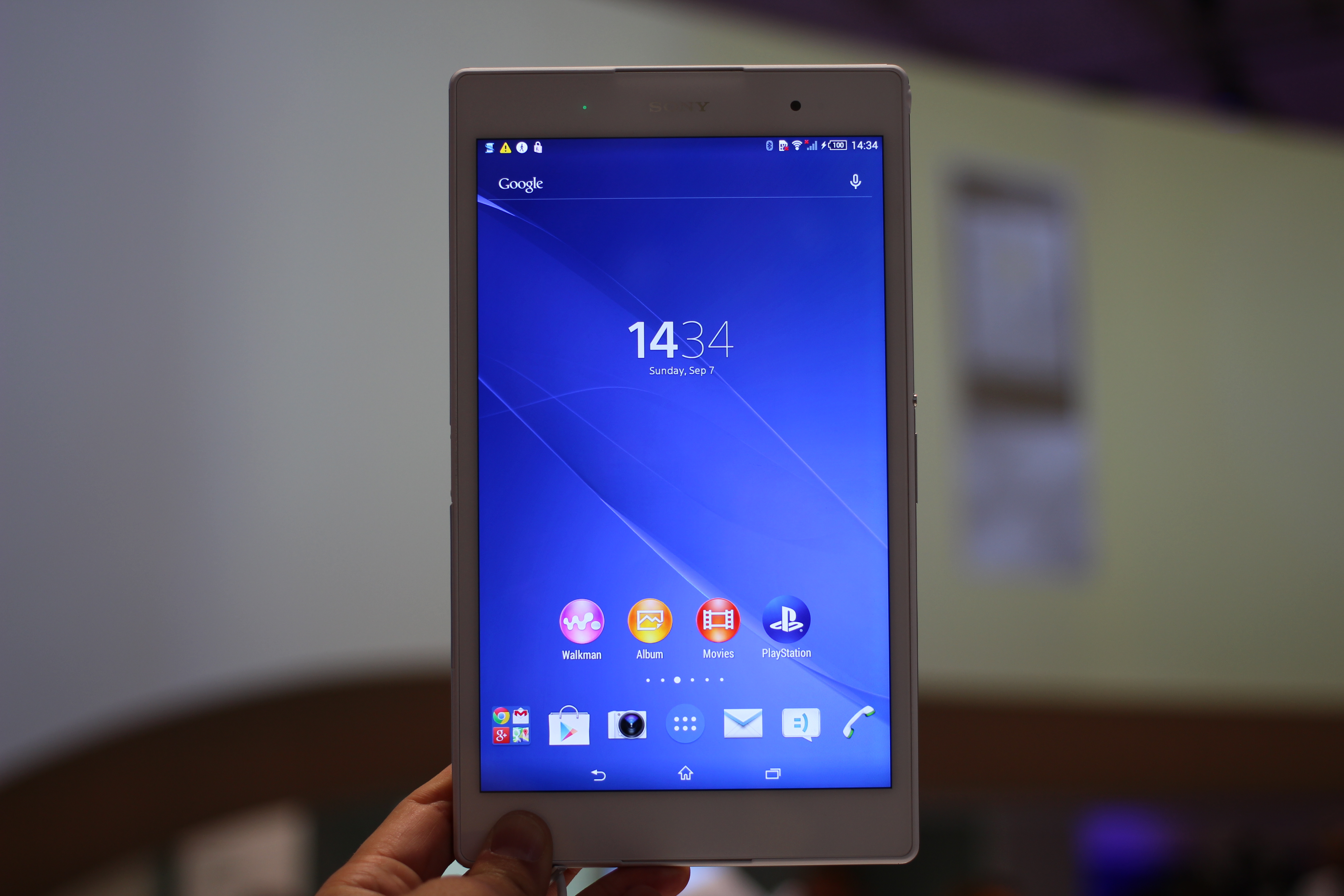
- Manufacturer: Sony
- Product family: Xperia series
- Type: Tablet computer
- Operating system: Android 4.4.4 KitKat; Upgradable to Android 6.0.1 Marshmallow
- System on a chip: Qualcomm Snapdragon 801
- CPU: 2.5 GHz quad-core Krait (2.5 GHz Qualcomm MSM8974AC Quad Core)
- Memory: 3 GB RAM
- Storage: 16 and 32 GB
- Removable storage: Up to 128 GB microSDXC
- Display: 8.0 in (200 mm) diagonal IPS LCD (1200x1920); TRILUMINOS™ Display with Live Color LED; X-Reality Engine for Mobile
- Graphics: Adreno 330
- Camera: 8 MP with Exmor R for Mobile; Sony Exmor RS for Mobile 1080p video recording @ 30 frames/s
- Connectivity: Wi-Fi; NFC; Bluetooth 4.0; MHL 3.0; USB 2.0 (Micro-B port, USB charging); USB OTG; 3.50 mm (0.138 in) headphone jack, 5 pole
- Power: 4,500 mAh
- Dimensions: 213.4 mm (8.40 in) H 123.6 mm (4.87 in) W 6.4 mm (0.25 in) D
- Weight: 270 g (9.5 oz)
- Predecessor: Sony Xperia Z Ultra(SGP412 Only)
- Related: Sony Xperia Z3; Sony Xperia Z3 Compact
- Website: Official Website

The Sony Xperia Z3 Tablet Compact is a waterproof, dustproof compact Android tablet manufactured and designed by Sony. It was unveiled during a press conference at IFA 2014 on September 3, 2014 along with the Xperia Z3 and Xperia Z3 Compact. It is the manufacturer's first 8.0 inch (203.2 mm) tablet. The tablet was the winner of the Reddot Award 2015 for the product design.

The key feature of the tablet is the compact size 8.0 inch (203.2 mm) display with density of 283 ppi. It also carries an IP rating of IP65 and IP68.

== Specifications ==
=== Hardware ===
The device is waterproof and dustproof with the IP rating of IP65 and IP68. The device features 8.0 inch (203.2 mm) display with density of 283 ppi, featuring Sony's "Triluminos" technology. The device is powered by 2.5 GHz quad-core Qualcomm Snapdragon 801 system-on-chip with 3 GB of RAM. The tablet's rear-facing camera is 8 megapixels with a Sony Exmor RS image sensor and can record 1080p video.

=== Software ===
The Xperia Z3 Tablet Compact comes pre-loaded with Android 4.4.4 "KitKat" with Sony's custom interface and software. Along with the Xperia Z3, the new additions to the software include the Lifelog app, Sony Select, and support for Remote Play on the PlayStation 4 video game console.

== Reception ==
In Engadget review, the tablet was given a score of 74 out of 100 and it was praised of its display and body built but criticized on its price and its camera.

Preceded by Sony Xperia Z Ultra(SGP412)	Sony Xperia Z3 Tablet Compact; 2014	Succeeded by Latest model
