= Blackphone =

Smartphone sold from 2014-2016

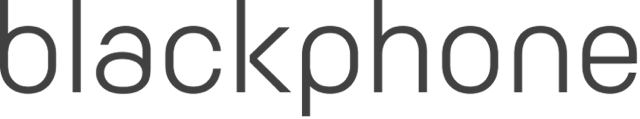

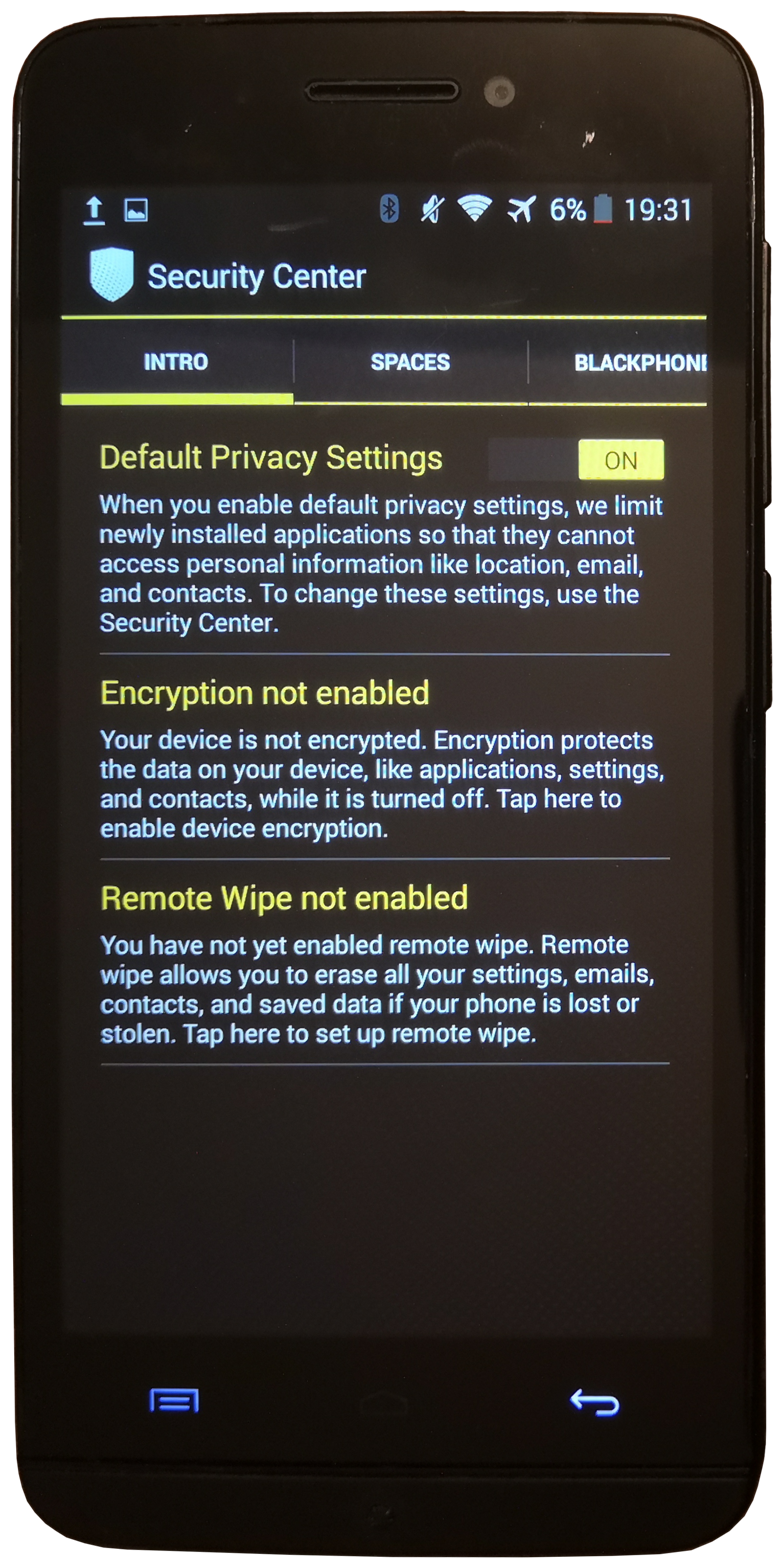
- Manufacturer: SGP Technologies, SA, a wholly owned subsidiary of Silent Circle
- Type: Smartphone
- Released: 30 June 2014
- Introductory price: US$629
- Operating system: Android
- System on a chip: Tegra 4i
- CPU: 2 GHz Nvidia Tegra 4i
- Memory: 1 GB LPDDR3 SDRAM
- Storage: 16 GB flash
- Display: 1280x720 4.7 in (120 mm) diagonal IPS LCD
- Camera: Rear: 8 MP with flash Front: 5 MP
- Connectivity: Wi-Fi: 802.11 a/b/g/n (2.4/5 GHz); GPS; Bluetooth v4.0
- Power: 2,000 mAh
- Online services: Bundled secure voice/video/text/file sharing and VPN service
- Weight: 119 g
- Website: silentcircle.com

The Blackphone was a smartphone built to ensure privacy, developed by SGP Technologies, a wholly owned subsidiary of Silent Circle. Originally, SGP Technologies was a joint venture between the makers of GeeksPhone and Silent Circle. Marketing is focused upon business users, stressing that employees often conduct business using private devices and services that are not secure and that the Blackphone service readily provides users with options that ensure confidentiality when needed. Blackphone provides Internet access through VPN. The device runs a modified version of Android called SilentOS that comes with a bundle of security-minded tools.

Versions of the Blackphone were sold from 2014 to 2016. While precise sales figures were not released, it is widely speculated to have been a financial disappointment due to the resulting near-bankruptcy of Silent Circle combined with Silent Circle canceling the phone.

== Background ==
The concept of an encrypted telephone has been an interest of Silent Circle founder and PGP creator, Phil Zimmermann, for a long time. In a video on the Blackphone web site, Zimmermann said,

I had to wait for the rest of the technology infrastructure to catch up to make it possible to do secure telephony. PGP was kind of a detour for me while waiting for the rest of the technology to catch up to make really good secure telephony possible.

Aaron Souppouris of The Verge wrote that "The Blackphone looks like a fairly standard Android phone. It has a 4.7-inch HD (the exact resolution has yet to be announced) IPS display, a 2 GHz quad-core processor, 16 GB of storage, an 8-megapixel camera, LTE — pretty much everything you'd want in a smartphone, and very little you wouldn't."

The Blackphone also allows insecure communications. Mike Janke, CEO and co-founder of Silent Circle, has suggested there are certain calls people want to encrypt, but "if you're ordering a pizza or calling your grandma", it's unlikely you'll feel the weight of criminals on your shoulders."

Blackphone runs a custom-built Android OS called SilentOS. Some major features of SilentOS are anonymous search, privacy-enabled bundled apps, smart disabling of Wi-Fi except trusted hotspots, more control in app permissions, and private communication (calling, texting, video chat, browsing, file sharing, and conference calls). Geeksphone also claims the telephone will receive frequent secure updates from Blackphone directly.

It supports the following 2G, 3G, and 4G bands, respectively:

- North America (Region2): GSM: 850 / 900 / 1800 / 1900 MHz; HSPA+/WCDMA: 850 / 1700 / 1900 / 2100 MHz (42 Mbit/s); LTE FDD bands: 4/7/17 (Cat. 3 100 Mbit/s)
- Other regions (Region1): GSM: 850 / 900 / 1800 / 1900 MHz; HSPA+/WCDMA: 850 / 900 / 1900 / 2100 MHz (42 Mbit/s); LTE FDD bands 3/7/20 (Cat. 3 100 Mbit/s)

LTE Cat. 4 (150 Mbit/s) is under development.

On 30 June 2014, the Blackphone began to ship advance orders. In early 2015, Geeksphone sold its part of SGP Technologies to Silent Circle to focus on wearables sold under the brand Geeksme. 14 engineers from Geeksphone, including Javier Agüera, remained in SGP.

Silent Circle released a successor to the Blackphone, the Blackphone 2, in September 2015. It has a 5.5-inch full HD screen with Gorilla Glass, and a Qualcomm Snapdragon Octa-Core processor. The price was increased to US$799.00.

== Services bundled ==
- A one-year subscription to Silent Circle’s secure voice and video calling and text messaging services, plus a one-year "Friend and Family" Silent Circle subscription that allows others to install the service on their smartphones.
- One year of SpiderOak cloud file storage and sharing, limited to 5 GB per month.

Kismet Smart Wi-Fi Manager comes pre-installed. It also includes an international power adapter kit and a headset.

== Reception ==
Ars Technica praised that the Blackphone's Security Center in PrivatOS gives control over app permissions, such as the bundled Silent Phone and Silent Text services that anonymise and encrypt communications so no one can eavesdrop on voice, video, and text calls. They also praised the Disconnect VPN and Search that keeps web trackers from the telephone and anonymises web searches and Internet traffic. The Ars Technica reviewer did not like that the telephone’s performance is mediocre, noting that using a custom OS means no Google Play or any of the other benefits of the Google ecosystem, spotty support for sideloaded apps, and reliance on Amazon or other third-party app stores.

As of June 2015, a Blackphone was on exhibit at the Victoria and Albert Museum and one had been added to the collection of the International Spy Museum.

== Financial difficulties ==
In 2016, Silent Circle had significant financial problems, caused by a significant overestimate of how many phones they could sell. This led to the near bankruptcy of the company. At some point in the 2010s, Silent Circle stopped selling Blackphones, although they still offer privacy software intended for off-the-shelf phones.
