= Firefox OS =

Mobile operating system by Mozilla (2014–2018)

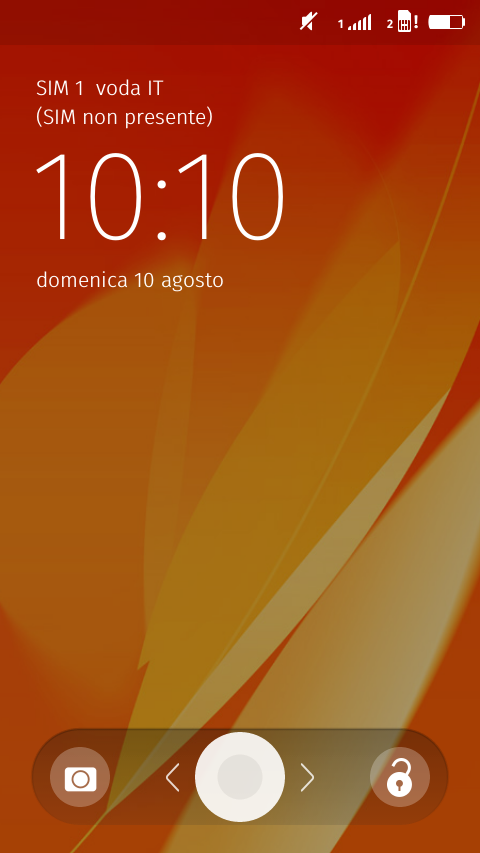
- Firefox OS 2.1 nightly build lock screen (Italian)
- Developer: Mozilla Corporation
- Written in: HTML5, CSS, JavaScript, C++
- OS family: Linux (Unix-like)
- Working state: Discontinued; forked to form KaiOS
- Source model: Open source
- Initial release: February 21, 2013; 13 years ago
- Final release: 2.2.0 / April 29, 2015; 11 years ago
- Final preview: 2.5.0
- Repository: github.com/mozilla-b2g/B2G
- Marketing target: Smartphones; Tablet computers
- Supported platforms: ARM, x86, MIPS
- Kernel type: Linux kernel
- Default user interface: Graphical
- License: MPL 2.0 and GPLv2 (Linux kernel)
- Official website: mozilla.org/firefox/os

Support status
- Unsupported as of September 2016

Firefox OS (project name: Boot to Gecko, also known as B2G) is a discontinued open-source operating system made for smartphones, tablet computers, smart TVs, and dongles designed by Mozilla and external contributors. It is based on the rendering engine of the Firefox web browser, Gecko, and on the Linux kernel. It was first commercially released in 2014.

Firefox OS was designed to provide a complete, community-based alternative operating system, for running web applications directly or those installed from an application marketplace. The applications use open standards and approaches such as JavaScript and HTML5, a robust privilege model, and open web APIs that can communicate directly with hardware, e.g. cellphone hardware. As such, Mozilla with Firefox OS competed with commercially developed operating systems such as Apple's iOS, Google's Android, Microsoft's Windows Phone, BlackBerry's BlackBerry 10, Samsung's/Linux Foundation's Tizen, and Jolla's Sailfish OS. In December 2015, Mozilla announced it would stop development of new Firefox OS smartphones and, in September 2016, announced the end of development. Successors to Firefox OS include the discontinued B2G OS and Acadine Technologies' never-released H5OS as well as KaiOS Technologies' KaiOS and Panasonic's My Home Screen for smart TVs.

== History ==
Firefox OS was publicly demonstrated in February 2012, on Android-compatible smartphones. By December 16, 2014, fourteen operators in 28 countries throughout the world offered Firefox OS phones.

On December 8, 2015, Mozilla announced that it would stop sales of Firefox OS smartphones through carriers. Mozilla later announced that Firefox OS smartphones would be discontinued by May 2016, as the development of "Firefox OS for smartphones" would cease after the release of version 2.6. Around the same time, it was reported that Acadine Technologies, a startup founded by Li Gong (former president of Mozilla Corporation) with various other former Mozilla staff among its employees, would take over the mission of developing carrier partnerships, for its own Firefox OS derivative H5OS.

In January 2016, Mozilla announced that Firefox OS would power Panasonic's UHD TVs (as previously announced Firefox OS "would pivot to connected devices"). In September 2016, Mozilla announced that work on Firefox OS had ceased, and that all B2G-related code would be removed from mozilla-central.

== Project inception and roll-out ==
=== Commencement of project ===
On July 25, 2011, Andreas Gal, Director of Research at Mozilla Corporation, announced the "Boot to Gecko" Project (B2G) on the mozilla.dev.platform mailing list. The project proposal was to "pursue the goal of building a complete, standalone operating system for the open web" in order to "find the gaps that keep web developers from being able to build apps that are – in every way – the equals of native apps built for the iPhone, Android, and Windows Phone 7." The announcement identified these work areas: new web APIs to expose device and OS capabilities such as telephone and camera, a privilege model to safely expose these to web pages, applications to prove these capabilities, and low-level code to boot on an Android-compatible device.

This led to much blog coverage. According to Ars Technica, "Mozilla says that B2G is motivated by a desire to demonstrate that the standards-based open Web has the potential to be a competitive alternative to the existing single-vendor application development stacks offered by the dominant mobile operating systems."

In 2012, Andreas Gal expanded on Mozilla's aims. He characterized the current set of mobile operating systems as "walled gardens" and presented Firefox OS as more accessible: "We use completely open standards and there’s no proprietary software or technology involved." (That changed in 2014; see Digital rights management (DRM), below.) Gal also said that because the software stack is entirely HTML5, there are already a large number of established developers. This assumption is employed in Mozilla's WebAPI. These are intended W3C standards that attempt to bridge the capability gap that currently exists between native frameworks and web applications. The goal of these efforts is to enable developers to build applications using WebAPI which would then run in any standards compliant browser without the need to rewrite their application for each platform.

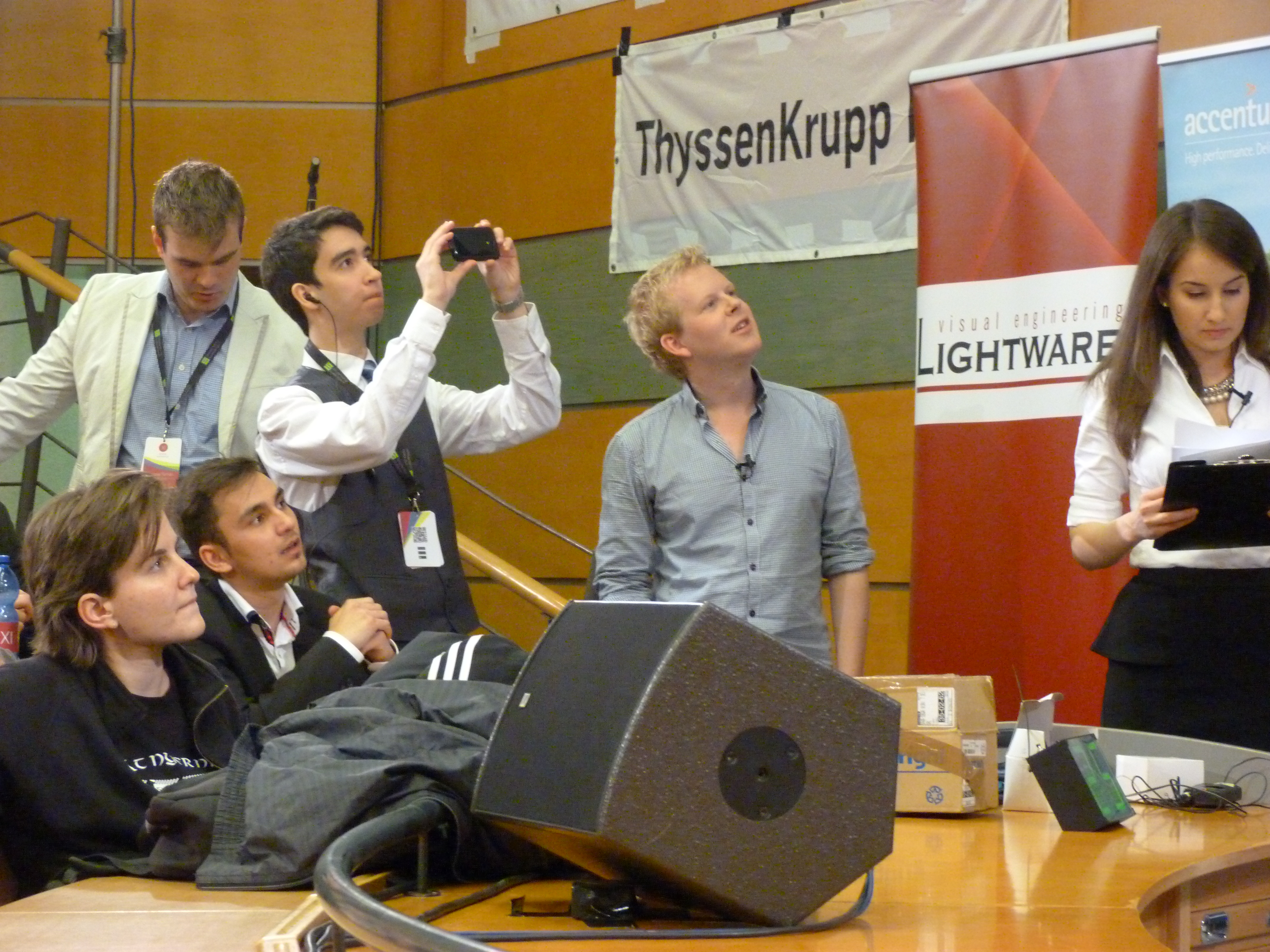
Jan Jongboom at the Simonyi Conference, 2014

=== Development history ===
In July 2012, Boot to Gecko was rebranded as 'Firefox OS', after Mozilla's well-known desktop browser, Firefox, and screenshots began appearing in August 2012.

In September 2012, analysts Strategy Analysts forecast that Firefox OS would account for 1% of the global smartphone market in 2013, its first year of commercial availability.

In February 2013, Mozilla announced plans for its global commercial roll-out of Firefox OS. Mozilla announced at a press conference before the start of Mobile World Congress in Barcelona that the first wave of Firefox OS devices would be available to consumers in Brazil, Colombia, Hungary, Mexico, Montenegro, Poland, Serbia, Spain and Venezuela. Mozilla also announced that LG Electronics, ZTE, Huawei and TCL Corporation had committed to making Firefox OS devices.

In December 2013, new features were added with the 1.2 release, including conference calling, silent SMS authentication for mobile billing, improved push notifications, and three state settings for Do Not Track.

Async Pan and Zoom (APZ), included in version 1.3, should improve user interface responsiveness.

Work was done to optimize Firefox OS to run a 128 MB platform with version 1.3T. A 128 MB device is out that seems to use that version but it may be unfinished.

In 2015, Mozilla ported Firefox OS (an "experimental version") to MIPS32 to work in a sub-$100 tablet (that can also run Android 4.4 KitKat). Mozilla has worked on developing the OS for Smart Feature Phones.

Firefox OS was discontinued in January 2017.

=== Digital rights management ===
In 2014, Gal announced a change in course, writing that future versions of the Firefox browser would include digital rights management (DRM). Implementation of DRM in the Firefox browser began with version 38.

In August 2015, attempts by Matchstick TV (based on Firefox OS) to add DRM caused the demise of Matchstick, a decision that Boing Boing called "suicide-by-DRM".

=== Demonstrations ===
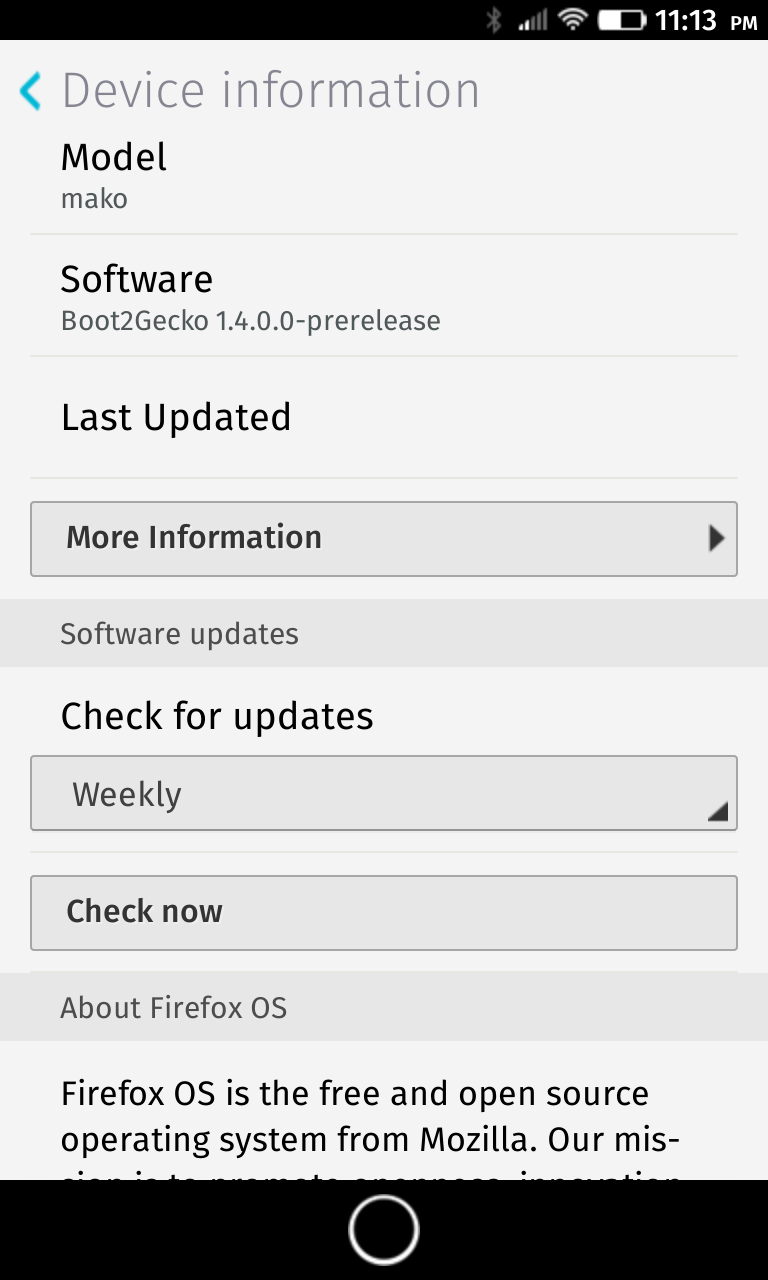
Mozilla's Firefox OS, version Boot2Gecko-prerelease on Nexus 4 (LG E960) (code name: mako)

At Mobile World Congress 2012, Mozilla and Telefónica announced that the Spanish telecommunications provider intended to deliver "open Web devices" in 2012, based on HTML5 and these APIs. Mozilla also announced support for the project from Adobe and Qualcomm, and that Deutsche Telekom’s Innovation Labs would join the project. Mozilla demonstrated a "sneak preview" of the software and apps running on Samsung Galaxy S II phones (replacing their usual Android operating system). In August 2012, a Nokia employee demonstrated the OS running on a Raspberry Pi.

Firefox OS is compatible with a number of devices, including Otoro, PandaBoard, Emulator (ARM and x86), Desktop, Nexus S, Nexus S 4G, Samsung Galaxy S II, Galaxy Nexus and Nexus 4. A MIPS port was created by Imagination Technologies in March 2015.

In December 2012, Mozilla rolled out another update and released Firefox OS Simulator 1.0, which can be downloaded as an add-on for Firefox. The latest version of Firefox OS Simulator, version 4.0, was released on July 3, 2013 and announced on July 11, 2013.

Mozilla's planned US$25 Firefox smartphone displayed at MWC, is built by Spreadtrum. Mozilla has collaborated with four handset makers and five wireless carriers to provide five Firefox-powered smartphones in Europe and Latin America so far with cellphone launches being led by UK marketer John D. Bernard. In India, Mozilla planned a launching at $25 in partnership with Intex and Spice, but the price ended up being $33 (converted from 1,999 Rupees).

== Core technologies ==
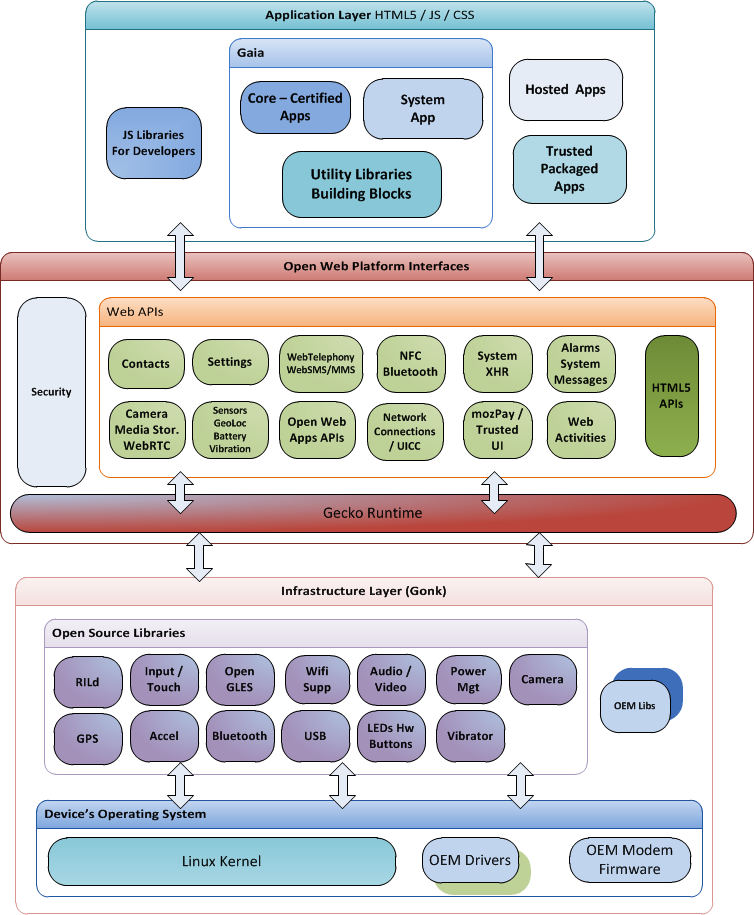
Firefox OS architecture diagram

The initial development work involves three major software layers:

- Gonk – platform denomination for a combination of the Linux kernel and the HAL from Android
- Gecko – the web browser engine and application run-time services layer
- Gaia – an HTML5 layer and user-interface system

=== Gonk ===
Gonk consists of a Linux kernel and user-space hardware abstraction layer (HAL). The kernel and several user-space libraries are common open-source projects: Linux, libusb, BlueZ, etc. Some other parts of the HAL are shared with the Android project: GPS, camera, among others. Gonk is basically an extremely simple Linux distribution and is therefore from Gecko's perspective, simply a porting target of Gecko; there is a port of Gecko to Gonk, just like there is a port of Gecko to OS X, and a port of Gecko to Android. However, since the development team has full control over Gonk, the developers can fully expose all the features and interfaces required for comprehensive mobile platforms such as Gecko, but which aren't currently possible to access on other mobile OSes. For example, using Gonk, Gecko can obtain direct access to the full telephone stack and display framebuffer, but doesn't have this access on any other OS.

=== Gecko ===
Gecko is the web browser engine of Firefox OS. Gecko implements open standards for HTML, CSS, and JavaScript. Gecko includes a networking stack, graphics stack, layout engine, virtual machine (for JavaScript), and porting layers.

=== Gaia ===
Gaia was the user interface of Firefox OS and controlled everything drawn to the screen. Gaia included by default implementations of a lock screen, home screen, telephone dialer and contacts application, text-messaging application, camera application and gallery support, plus the classic phone apps: mail, calendar, calculator and marketplace. Gaia was written entirely in HTML, CSS, and JavaScript. It interfaced with the operating system through Open Web APIs, which were implemented by Gecko. Because it used only standard web APIs, it could work on other OSes and other web browsers.

== Release history ==
The startup sequence on an Alcatel One Touch Fire E

| Version | First build created | Feature complete (FC) date | Code complete (CC) date | Release date | Codename | Gecko version | Included security fixes | End of life |
|---|---|---|---|---|---|---|---|---|
| 1.0 | August 14, 2012 | December 22, 2012 | | February 21, 2013 | TEF | Gecko 18 | Gecko 18 | February 21, 2013 |
| 1.0.1 | January 25, 2013 | | | September 6, 2013 | Shira | Gecko 18 | Gecko 20 | September 6, 2013 |
| 1.1.0 | February 20, 2013 | March 29, 2013 | | October 9, 2013 | Leo | Gecko 18+ (new APIs) | Gecko 23 | May 27, 2014 |
| 1.1.1 | August 24, 2013 | | | | HD | Gecko 18+ (new APIs) | Gecko 23 | May 27, 2014 |
| 1.2.0 | June 21, 2013 | September 15, 2013 | | December 9, 2013 | Koi | Gecko 26 | Gecko 26 | June 9, 2014 |
| 1.2.1 | December 4, 2013 | | | | | Gecko 26 | Gecko 26 | December 17, 2013 |
| 1.3.0 | September 17, 2013 | January 31, 2014 | | March 17, 2014 | | Gecko 28 | Gecko 28 | September 4, 2014 |
| 1.3.0t | April 8, 2014 | | | | | Gecko 28 | Gecko 28 | December 19, 2014 |
| 1.4.0 | December 10, 2013 | April 25, 2014 | June 9, 2014 | August 8, 2014 | | Gecko 30 | Gecko 30 | May 14, 2015 |
| 1.5.0 | March 17, 2014 | | | | | | | April 14, 2014 |
| 2.0.0 | February 21, 2013 | July 21, 2014 | September 1, 2014 | | | Gecko 32 | Gecko 32 | July 23, 2015 |
| 2.1.0 | June 9, 2014 | October 13, 2014 | November 21, 2014 | | | Gecko 34 | Gecko 34 | July 23, 2015 |
| 2.2.0 | September 2, 2014 | April 29, 2015 | June 8, 2015 | August 20, 2015 | | Gecko 37 | Gecko 37 | |
| 2.5.0 | January 12, 2015 | November 2, 2015 (planned) | January 4, 2016 (planned) | | | Gecko 44 | Gecko 44 | |
| 2.6.0 | October 30, 2015 | | | | | | | |
| Spark v0.1 | April 15, 2015 | June 22, 2015 | | | Spark | Latest | | |

== Forks ==
Panasonic developed a version of the operating system called My Home Screen for use in their Smart TVs, The company discontinued the operating system in televisions made from 2024, which use Amazon's unrelated Fire OS.

Acadine Technologies has derived their H5OS from Firefox OS as well. Li Gong, the founder of the company, had overseen the development of Firefox OS while serving as president of Mozilla Corporation.

A fork called KaiOS has been used on a few feature phones, including Alcatel's OneTouch Go Flip (known as Cingular Flip 2 on AT&T), Reliance Jio's JioPhone (LYF F30C), and Intex's Turbo+ 4G. The system brings support for 4G LTE, Wi-Fi, GPS, and HTML5-based apps onto non-touch devices with an optimized user interface, less memory usage, and longer battery life.

=== B2G OS ===
B2G OS
- Developer: Mozilla community
- OS family: Firefox OS/Open Web (based on Linux kernel)
- Working state: Inactive
- Repository: github.com/mozilla-b2g/B2G
- Official website: github.com/mozilla-b2g/B2G

B2G OS (Boot 2 Gecko) was a community-developed mobile operating system, and the successor to Firefox OS. It follows the Firefox OS goal of providing a complete, community-based alternative operating system, that runs software as web applications. Its mobile apps therefore use open web standards and programming languages such as JavaScript and HTML5, a robust privilege model, and open web APIs that can communicate directly with the device's hardware.

It is now the basis of KaiOS which has (as of January 2019) over 17 percent of the Indian mobile phone market and is the third most popular phone OS. KaiOS is closed-source.

==== History ====
B2G OS was forked from Firefox OS following Mozilla's decision to discontinue support for their mobile operating system. The decision was made, according to Ari Jaaksi and David Bryant, in order to "evolve quickly and enable substantial new architectural changes in Gecko, Mozilla’s Platform Engineering organization needs to remove all B2G-related code from mozilla-central." As of 2017, B2G OS is no longer maintained.

=== Capyloon ===
Capyloon
- Developer: Capyloon community github.com/capyloon
- OS family: Firefox OS/Open Web (based on Linux kernel)
- Working state: Current
- Repository: github.com/capyloon/B2G
- Official website: capyloon.org

Capyloon is a modern fork of Firefox OS started in 2022 which additionally makes use of decentralized web technologies such as IPFS.

Builds are available for Pixel 3a and Pixel 6a devices, as well as GSI images for Android 10 based devices. Linux mobile devices such as the PinePhone, PinePhone Pro and Librem 5 are also supported.

== Comparison with Android ==
Firefox OS used the Linux kernel like Android does. Firefox OS used the Gecko engine on top of the Linux kernel to render the screen output. Apps were written using HTML5, CSS, and JavaScript—all three being cooperative languages used in making internet webpages. In essence, apps on Firefox OS were web apps and the OS could be thought of as a Web browser that stored content off-line. On the other hand, Android's apps are coded in Java using Android Studio. Android also enjoys greater maturity and support. Despite these differences, Firefox OS did feature all the essentials required to use a smartphone. Firefox launched its first official device in Germany in 2014, which was an Alcatel One Touch Fire. The device had a 3.5” HVGA screen, Cortex A5 processor, 256MB RAM, and 512MB storage. As of December 2015, Mozilla had launched 12 smartphones across 24 countries.

== Reception ==
Chris Ziegler of the technology website The Verge wrote that Firefox OS would take app distribution back to the pre-iPhone era, requiring application developers to deal with multiple carriers and their app stores. At the Mobile World Congress, Mozilla's CEO Gary Kovacs said that Firefox OS has the advantage that users need not install an app to use it. Mozilla sought to make the most of this with the search functionality built into Firefox OS, a core feature of the platform.

Janne Lindqvist, a mobile security researcher at the Rutgers University WINLAB, expressed concern about the discovery mechanism of a Web-based platform, but a Mozilla spokesperson stated that Mozilla required developers to "package downloadable apps in a zip file that has been cryptographically signed by the store from which it originated, assuring that it has been reviewed." In addition, "apps coming back from search are given only limited access to device programming interfaces and applications, unless the user grants permission for further access."

Ben Francis, an engineer on the Boot to Gecko and Firefox OS projects, described the changes in direction of the project from open web technologies for app development, to cheap smartphones, to connected devices; and how evaluation of its success was reduced to its market share as a third smartphone platform (after Android and iOS).

== Devices ==
=== Officially and unofficially supported devices ===
The structural similarities between Firefox OS and Android allow the Mozilla platform to run on a number of devices that ship with Android. While some ports of Firefox OS are hardly different from their original versions, others are heavily modified to fit the device in question. There are quite a few to note that are specifically made for Firefox OS as stated above. There are some that are designed for the developers themselves and others that are consumer-phones. There are also emulators for testing both apps and the OS itself on the desktop which are designed for both OS testing and the developers themselves.

Firefox OS specific devices for developers:

- Geeksphone Keon
- Geeksphone Peak
- T2Mobile Flame
- ZTE Open
- ZTE Open C

Firefox OS specific devices for consumers:

- Alcatel Onetouch Fire C
- Alcatel Onetouch Fire E
- Alcatel Onetouch Fire S
- Alcatel Onetouch Pixi 3 (only some versions - also available with Android 4.2.2 and Windows Phone 8.1)
- APC Paper
- Cherry Mobile Ace
- Intex Cloud FX
- KDDI Fx0
- Spice Fire One MI FX1
- Spice Fire One Mi-FX 2
- Symphony GoFox F15
- Zen 105 Firefox
- ZTE Open C
- ZTE Open L
- ZTE Open II

Firefox OS has been ported to the following devices:

- Fairphone 2
- HTC Explorer
- Huawei Ascend G510
- Huawei Ascend Y300
- Ingenic JZ4780 based devices (2015)
- Moto G
- Nexus 4
- Nexus 5
- Nexus 7 (2013)
- Xiaomi Redmi 1S
- Samsung Galaxy S2
- Sony Xperia E3
- Sony Xperia M2
- Sony Xperia SP
- Sony Xperia T2 Ultra
- Sony Xperia T3
- Sony Xperia Z1
- Sony Xperia Z2
- Sony Xperia Z3
- Sony Xperia Z3 Compact
- Sony Xperia Z3 Tablet Compact
- Wileyfox Swift
- ZTE Blade III
- ZTE Kis3/Kis III

There is also non-compiled source code of B2G firmware for Sony Xperia E (C1505/C1506) on Sony servers. In earlier versions of Sony EMMA software, it was possible to download precompiled firmware, but nowadays it's impossible to do it as the software no longer supports this phone and probably the FTF files needed to flash were deleted from Sony's servers

== See also ==
- H5OS
- KaiOS
- OpenFlint – open streaming technology for Firefox OS using the Matchstick dongle
- Stagefright (bug) – security bug fixed in Firefox OS 2.2, but mostly known to affect Android
- MeeGo
- Sailfish OS
- WebOS
- Comparison of mobile operating systems
- Comparison of Firefox OS devices
