= BQ (company) =

Spanish Company

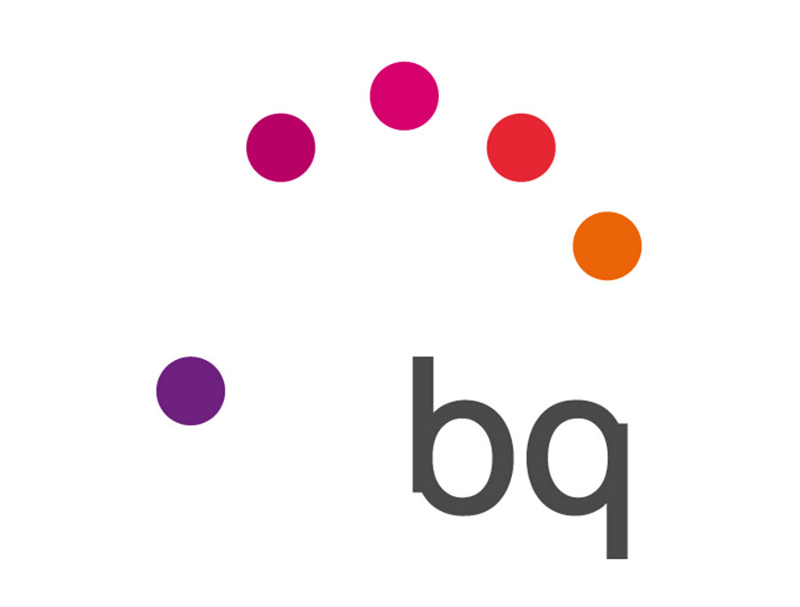
- Five fingerprint logo
- Company type: Sociedad Limitada
- Founded: 2009 in Madrid, Spain
- Defunct: 2021
- Fate: Ceased operations
- Headquarters: Las Rozas de Madrid (Community of Madrid), Spain
- Products: Smartphones, Tablets, e-readers and 3D printers
- Number of employees: 1,028 (2014)
- Website: www.bq.com

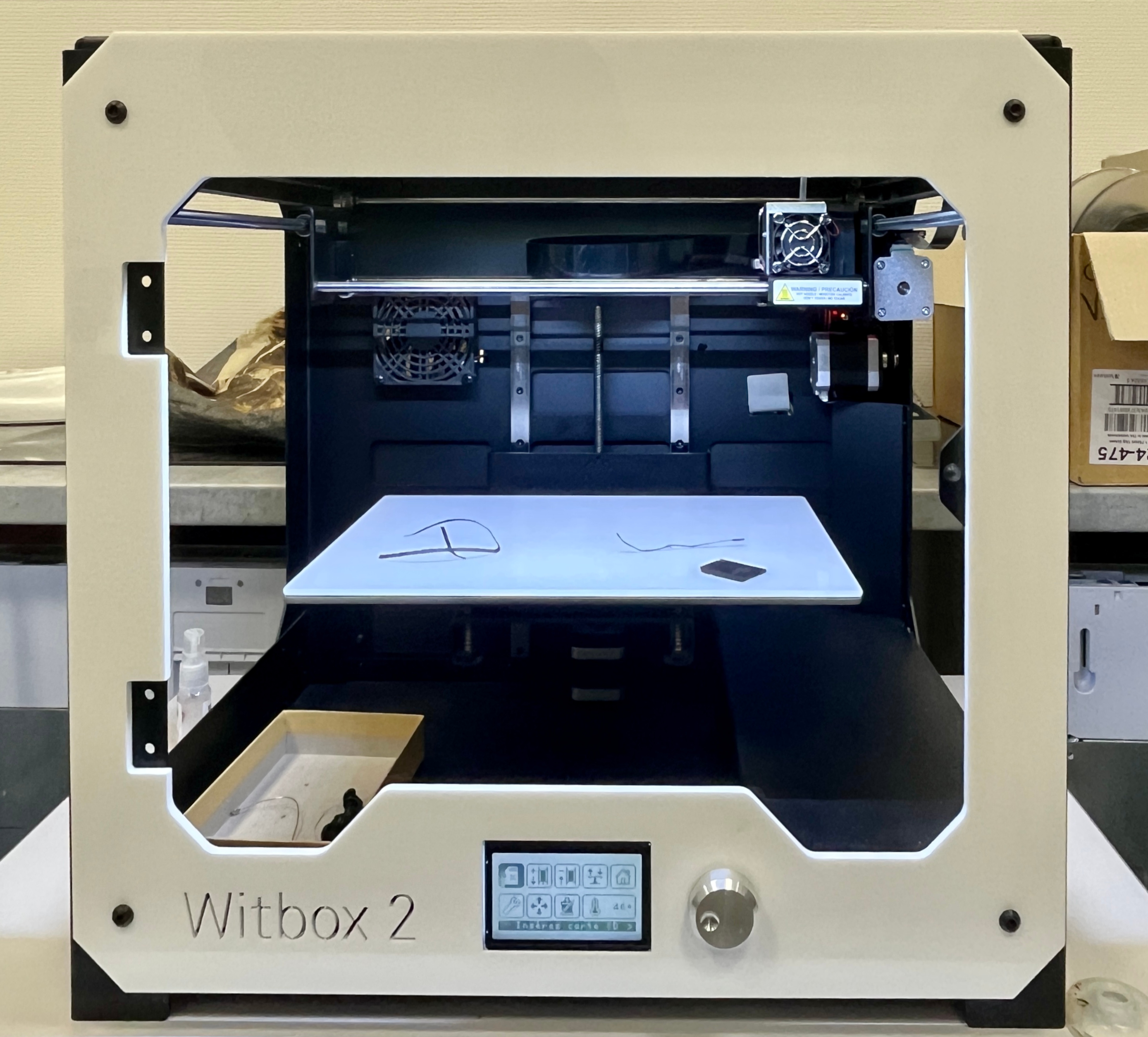
BQ's Witbox 2 FDM-3D printer

BQ (former name: Mundo Reader) was a Spanish company brand of user electronics devices, such as smartphones, tablets, e-readers and 3D printers among other products.

Among BQ's most notable products are the first AndroidOne mobile phone in Europe (the BQ Aquaris A4.5), as well as both the world's first mobile phone and tablet running the Ubuntu Phone operating system, (the BQ Aquaris E4.5 and BQ Aquaris M10). In 2018, the Vietnamese conglomerate Vingroup acquired 51% share of BQ and active in Vietnam under the name of VinSmart.

== History ==
The company started its business in 2009 importing e-readers from Asia. In 2010 it started to produce its own tablets and e-readers.

In 2013, the company had 600 employees and it produced 400,000 tablets and 100,000 e-readers.

In 2014, the company entered the Portuguese market.

In 2015, the company produced a smartphone (BQ Aquaris E4.5 Ubuntu Edition) that runs the Ubuntu operating system.

In 2016, the company released the BQ Aquaris M10 Ubuntu Edition tablet.

In August 2016 BQ filed a lawsuit in the Moscow Arbitration Court against the Russian smartphone manufacturer Antares LLC for the use of the BQ trademark. The Spanish company demanded three million rubles, but the Russian company claimed that it was using the brand legally. The court sided with the Russian company.

After the sale to Vingroup in 2018, BQ remained active in the Vietnamese market under the name VinSmart, producing Vsmart-branded phones. In 2021, Vingroup withdrew from the smartphone market, and BQ filed for bankruptcy.

Revenue, by year:

- 2014: 202.5 million euro.
- 2013: 115 million euro.
- 2012: 37.3 million euro.
- 2011: 25 million euro.
- 2010: 3.8 million euro.

== Mobile phones and tablets ==
AndroidOne:

- BQ Aquaris X2 Pro
- BQ Aquaris X2
- BQ Aquaris A4.5

Android high-end:

- BQ Aquaris X Pro
- BQ Aquaris X
- BQ Aquaris X5 Plus
- BQ Aquaris X5

Android mid-range:

- BQ Aquaris M5
- BQ Aquaris E4.5
- BQ Aquaris E5

Android Cyanogen:

- BQ Aquaris M5
- BQ Aquaris X5 Cyanogen Edition

Ubuntu Phone:

- BQ Aquaris M10
- BQ Aquaris E4.5
- BQ Aquaris E5

Other:

- BQ Aquaris E6
- BQ Aquaris E4

== See also ==
- VinSmart
- List of mobile phone brands by country
- Comparison of tablets
