= BQ Aquaris M10 =

Android tablet

- Manufacturer: BQ
- Type: Tablet computer
- Series: BQ Aquaris series
- First released: M10 & M10 FHD: 14 October 2015; 10 years ago M10 Ubuntu Edition: 5 February 2016; 10 years ago
- Predecessor: BQ Aquaris E5 (phone)
- Form factor: Tablet
- Dimensions: 246 mm (9.7 in) H; 171 mm (6.7 in) W; 8.2 mm (0.32 in) D
- Weight: 470 g (16.6 oz)
- Operating system: Android, Ubuntu Touch
- CPU: M10: MediaTek MT8163B Quad-core 1.3 GHz; M10 FHD: MediaTek MT8163A 1.5 GHz
- GPU: Mali Mali-T720MP2
- Memory: 2 GB
- Storage: 16 GB
- Removable storage: microSD slot, up to 64 GB
- Battery: 7,280 mAh LIPO
- Rear camera: M10: 5 megapixel M10 FHD: 8 megapixel
- Front camera: M10: 2 megapixel M10 FHD: 5 megapixel
- Display: M10 : 10.1 in (260 mm) 1280x800 pixel (160 pixels per inch); M10 FHD : 10.1 in (260 mm) 1920x1200 pixel (240 pixels per inch)
- Model: M10; M10 FHD
- Website: www.bq.com/en/aquaris-m10

The Aquaris M10 and Aquaris M10 FHD are Android tablets from the Spanish manufacturer BQ that were released to market in October 2015. The devices shipped with Android 5.1 (Lollipop). BQ elected not to skin the operating system and as such it retains the unmodified "Google Experience", such as found on the Google Nexus.

== Ubuntu Edition ==
On 5 Feb 2016 BQ in partnership with Canonical launched the Aquaris M10 Ubuntu Edition, to be sold globally. The tablet is available in both the Aquaris M10 FHD hardware (with the 1920x1200 screen) and the Aquaris M10 HD version (with the 1280 x 800 screen) from the BQ store. In April 2016, this became the first tablet to be sold with the Ubuntu Touch operating system.

One of the main features of Ubuntu Touch is convergence, which means that the tablet has both a "tablet mode" and a "desktop mode":

- In desktop mode, a keyboard and mouse can be connected and the tablet shows windows with window borders. Programs made for desktop Linux work in this mode.
- In tablet mode, it can connect to a screen through a HDMI port and then it becomes a touchpad. The tablet mode uses a touch UI designed for use with fingers on the screen.

Another feature of Ubuntu Touch is "Scopes", which are information screens where external information is gathered for the user's convenience. Users do not have to launch an app to see their favourite content, they can swipe to the scope that matches what they are looking for, and all the relevant information is displayed. Apple may have copied the "today scope" from Ubuntu Touch as one of their new features for iOS 10.

== See also ==
- BQ Aquaris E4.5
- BQ Aquaris E5
- Comparison of tablets

Preceded by BQ Aquaris E5	BQ Aquaris M10; 2016	Succeeded by
