= List of highest-funded crowdfunding projects =

This is an incomplete list of the highest-funded crowdfunding projects (including projects which failed to achieve funding).

Overview of highest-funded crowdfunding projects
Rank	Project	Category	Platform	End date	Target	Amount raised	Notes
1	EOS	Blockchain	Ethereum	June 1, 2018	—N/a	$4,100,000,000 (7.12 million ETH)	EOS is a blockchain operating system designed to support commercial decentralized applications. The amount in US dollars is based on an exchange rate of $576 per ether.
2	Filecoin	Blockchain	Ethereum	September 7, 2017	—N/a	$257,000,000	Filecoin is a decentralized data storage application.
3	U-Haul Investors Club	Business equipment	Independent	Ongoing (started in 2011)	—N/a	$236,708,700 (updated weekly after COB on Tuesdays)	Operated by AMERCO (the parent company of U-Haul) this platform allows investors to invest in U-Haul assets such as trucks, trailers, equipment dollies and occasionally in real estate. Investors purchase "U-Notes" in $100 increments and have maturities from 2-30 years. Investors can invest via individual, business or trust accounts, Coverdell Education Savings accounts, and both traditional and Roth IRA's. Payments are made quarterly in arrears, of which part of the payment is interest and the rest a partial return of principal. It is limited to the U.S. only, interest is not earned on amounts not invested in U-Notes, and there is no trading market (only between club investors) making them highly illiquid; they will need to be held till maturity.
4	Tezos	Blockchain	Independent	July 14, 2017	—N/a	$232,000,000	Tezos is a self-governing blockchain.
5	Star Citizen	Video game	Kickstarter, Independent, Early Access sales (not crowdfund)	Ongoing	$2M	$174,156,668 (total crowdfunded amount until start of Early Access release in December 2017, see notes)	Space combat video game being developed by Chris Roberts, designer of Wing Commander. By April 19, 2013, a combined US$9,061,882 had been raised on Kickstarter and Roberts' own website. It was listed as a Guinness World Record in 2014, after having raised more than US$40,680,576 through Roberts' own website. Statements from the developer confirm the game was released in Early Access in 2017. At the end of 2017 the developer had raised $174M through crowdfunding. Since then, the developer has not stated a clear split of crowdfund based revenues and straight Early Access sales so the total crowdfund figure is unclear. As of 7 December 2024 the developer alleges a total of $764,245,320 has been raised, which includes both crowdfund and Early Access sales.
6	The DAO	Blockchain	Ethereum	May 28, 2016	$500K	$160,000,000 (in ETH)	A publicly created and crowdfunded Decentralized Autonomous Organization, built on the Ethereum blockchain, that stored and transmitted Ether and Ethereum-based assets. Funds were held programmatically by design in the cryptocurrency known as Ether, the actual USD amount raised varied in line with the Ether|USD exchange rate at any given moment. Final raised amount was ETH 11.5 million. The amount listed is the conversion value of the raised Ethereum at the campaign end date.
7	Sirin Labs (SRN)	Mobile	Ethereum, Bitcoin	December, 2017	—N/a	$158,000,000	A blockchain phone that makes it easier to use digital currency. Expected to sell for over $1000 with 25,000 units pre-ordered.
8	Bancor	Blockchain	Ethereum	June 12, 2017	$100M	$153,000,000 (in ETH)	The Bancor protocol is a smart contracts platform built on top of the Ethereum blockchain.
9	Polkadot	Blockchain	Ethereum	October 27, 2017	-	$144,300,000	Polkadot is a heterogeneous multichain which posits a trustless fully decentralised "federation" of public and private blockchains with trust-free access to each other.
10	Status	Blockchain	Ethereum	June 21, 2017	$12M	$103,000,000	
11	TenX	Blockchain	Ethereum	June 24, 2017	$80M	$80,000,000 (245,832 ETH)	TenX offer a debit card system to customers and combine that with an open-source backend that allows TenX to connect any blockchain through hashed timelock contracts (HTLCs). TenX raised 100,000 ETH in a pre-sale and another 145,000 ETH equivalent during their token sale on June 24, 2017.
12	BANKEX	Blockchain	Ethereum	December 26, 2017	$50M	$70,600,000	BANKEX is a blockchain-based distributed financial technology platform. It allows people and enterprises to create and trade their digital assets represented as smart asset tokens on a blockchain.
13	TRON	Blockchain	Ethereum	Sep 2, 2017	$70M	$70,000,000	TRON is a blockchain project that supports the global digital entertainment system. As an open-source project, it supports various types of smart contracts and contract systems such as Bitcoin, Ethereum and EOS.
14	The Chosen	TV series	Angel Studios	Ongoing	$13M (Season 1) $10M (Season 2)	$68,559,454	TV series based on the life of Jesus Christ. The value comprises $10,200,000 for Season 1 and $6,544,120 for Season 2 as of 21 July 2020
15	æternity	Blockchain	Ethereum	Jun 9, 2017	—N/a	$62,500,000.00	æternity is a new type of open-source, public, Blockchain-based distributed computing platform that innovates and expands upon existing platforms such as Bitcoin, Ethereum. Real-world data can interface with smart contracts through decentralized oracles. True scalability and trust-less Turing-complete state channels sets æternity apart from all other Blockchain 2.0 projects. Contribution was divided into two phases and closed by 9 June 2017. Total amount raised in Phase 1 + Phase 2 is over $62.5 million (at ETH and BTC valuation on 9 June 2017).
16	Sono Motors Sion	Solar electric vehicle	Independent	Jan 20, 2020	50M €	$59,226,997 (€53.342.998 )	Sono Motors is a Munich based company that develops an electric vehicle that can be charged by solar cells that are integrated in the vehicle's outer skin. The system is also prepared for vehicle to grid/vehicle applications as well as car and ride sharing.
17	MobileGo	Blockchain	Ethereum, Waves platform	May 24, 2017	—N/a	$53,069,235	MobileGo tokens will be used to gamify the mobile platform, and to incentivize gamers for loyalty and participation through rewards. MobileGo tokens will also allow for smart contract technology. MobileGo tokens will allow for the development of a decentralized virtual mobile gamer marketplace, the ability for gamer vs. gamer decentralized match play, and decentralized tournaments run on smart contracts.
18	The David Movie	Movie	Independent	Mar 31, 2023	$60,982,236	$52,448,609	An animated movie based on the Biblical character David. Produced by Sunrise and being published by Angel Studios.
19	AssangeDAO	Other	Juicebox, Ethereum	Feb 8, 2022	—N/a	$52,382,594 (in ETH)	A decentralized autonomous organization which raised 17,422 ETH in less than a week to bid on Clock, a non-fungible token created by the digital artist Pak in collaboration with Julian Assange. The proceeds supported Assange's legal defense fund.
20	ConstitutionDAO	Other	Juicebox, Ethereum	Nov 18, 2021	—N/a	$49,520,510 (in ETH)	A single-purpose decentralized autonomous organization which raised 11,600 ETH in under a week to bid on a first-edition copy of the United States Constitution at a Sotheby's auction. ConstitutionDAO was ultimately outbid, and offered its contributors a refund minus transaction fees.
21	Surprise! Four Secret Novels by Brandon Sanderson	Publishing	Kickstarter BackerKit	Mar 31, 2022 On Kickstarter; April 30, 2022 on backerkit	$1M	$45,574,127	A subscription-based publishing of four "secret" novels by author Brandon Sanderson (i.e., novels which Sanderson wrote without telling anyone that they were in progress). Exceeded Dragonsteel Entertainment's previous Kickstarter in 6 hours. Fastest Kickstarter to hit $4M at the time. Reached $10M in under 10 hours, $20M in under 60 hours, $41,754,153 within hours of ending. Most funded Kickstarter ever and then reached a final of $45,574,127 a month later in Backerkit
22	Basic Attention Token	Blockchain	Ethereum	May 31, 2017	—N/a	$35,000,000	Basic Attention Token is a token on the Brave Browser. BAT allows marketers to sell and publishers to buy ads without exposing users to constant tracking. Targeting is handled by the browser. The user gets paid a small amount for viewing ads. The initial coin offering sold out in under 30 seconds.[1]
23	Polybius Bank	Blockchain bank	Bitcoin, Ethereum	July 5, 2017	$25M for bank with Digital Pass. (Ladderized target with flexible plan.)	$31,645,088 (₿12,379.689) = 3,650,521 PLBT	Project: Polybius Bank is a project aimed to create the world's first fully digital bank that is EU-regulated and crowdfunded by its own users through tokens ($PLBT).
24	CyberMiles	Blockchain, E-commerce	Ethereum, Independent	November 22, 2017	$30M	$30,000,000 (71,850 ETH)	CyberMiles is an in-development blockchain protocol specifically designed and optimized for e-commerce.
25	Solve.Care	Blockchain, Healthcare	Ethereum	Apr 30, 2018	$30m	30,000,000	Solve.Care is for coordination, administration and payments in the healthcare industry. Patients will be able to make reservations and share relevant data.
26	Windpark Fryslân	Windpark	Invesdor	März 29, 2024	$10,000,000	$28,780,000	The Fryslân wind farm project in the Frisian part of the IJsselmeer consists of 89 wind turbines with a capacity of 4.3 megawatts each and is the largest wind farm in an inland waterway in the world.
27	Glowforge	Manufacturing hardware	WordPress, Elevato	Oct 24, 2015	$100,000	$27,907,995	Glowforge uses a beam of light the width of a human hair to cut, engrave, and shape designs from a variety of materials. Called a "3D laser printer" by the makers, in actuality it is a laser cutter.
28	BitClave	Blockchain	Ethereum	November 29, 2017	—N/a	$25,547,000	BitClave is using blockchain to eliminate ad service "middlemen" and create a direct connection between businesses and customers.
29	We Build the Wall	Community	GoFundMe	—N/a	$1.0B	$25,425,600	Construction of the Border barrier at the Mexico–United States border. The idea originated and gained popularity from the political platform of the Donald Trump 2016 presidential campaign. The project raised over $9 million in only 3 days after its launch. At least three individuals have been convicted of conspiracy to commit wire fraud in relation to this crowdfunding project.
30	Aragon	Blockchain	Ethereum	May 17, 2017	—N/a	$25,000,000	Aragon is a management platform for decentralized organizations. Aragon implements organizational features such as governance, fundraising, payroll and accounting. Aragon launched a token sale for the Aragon Network, the world's first decentralized jurisdiction. The Aragon Network will provide organizations subscribed to it with services such as a decentralized arbitration system or a code upgradeability mechanism. The token sale closed in about 15 minutes, peaking at a rate of $122,000 per second.
31	Words of Radiance Leatherbound by Brandon Sanderson	Publishing	BackerKit	Mar 31, 2024	$2M	$23,756,818	A 10-year anniversary edition of Book 2 of the Stormlight Archives, with additional publication of Dragonsteel Prime [non-canon work not previously published] and "Secret Project #5" (sequel to the highest Kickstarter ever), an unknown work add-on. Crashed Backerkit and funded at 400% in less than three hours. $10M in 4 hours.
32	Nemesis: Retaliation	Board Game	Gamefound	Dec 14, 2023	$50K	$21,467,523	Nemesis: Retaliation is the third instalment of the Nemesis board game series, from the Polish publisher Awaken Realms. It's the highest-funded board game in the history of crowdfunding.
33	Pebble Time	Smartwatch	Kickstarter	Mar 27, 2015	$500K	$20,338,986	The Pebble Time is the second generation version of the smartwatch called the Pebble. The Pebble itself was one of the highest backed projects on Kickstarter.
34	Prison Architect	Video game	Independent, Steam Early Access	Oct 6, 2015	—N/a	$19,000,000	Prison construction and management simulation game by Introversion Software. It was made available as a paid alpha pre-order on September 25, 2012 and was one of the initial games in Valve's Steam Early Access program when it was launched.
35	Ethereum	Blockchain	Independent	Sep 2, 2014	—N/a	$18,300,000	Ethereum is a public blockchain-based distributed computing platform, featuring smart contract functionality and a cryptocurrency, Ether.
36	Time for the Planet	Climate change	Independent	Ongoing	1B €	$17,020,394 (€15.853.128 )	Time for the Planet is a citizens' movement fighting against global warming. This movement invests in innovations to reduce GHG emissions on a global scale. To have a better chance of deployment, a successful entrepreneur will be recruited to develop the best business plan for this innovation, and money will be invested in this project. Finally, all innovations will be shared in a free license to allow everyone to copy them.
37	Power Ledger	Blockchain	Ethereum	October 6, 2017	—N/a	$17,000,000 = 34,000,000 AUD	POWR token sale is Australia's first initial coin offering. The company raised half of the total funds in three days during its pre-sale.
38	Sandclock	Blockchain	Ethereum	October 26, 2021	—N/a	$16,900,000	Quartz is the governance token of the Sandclock ecosystem. Sandclock is a fintech built on the blockchain and offers users the ability to save, invest, donate and spend.
39	Cosmos	Blockchain	Bitcoin, Ethereum	Apr 6, 2017	$10m	$16,800,000	Cosmos aims to create a network of ledgers to solve long-standing problems in the cryptocurrency and blockchain communities. One of the most prominent use cases is decentralized exchanging from one currency to another. Currently this is largely done on centralized exchanges
40	TokenCard	Blockchain	Ethereum	May 3, 2017	—N/a	$16,516,286	TokenCard is a depositless Ethereum-based mobile banking platform that aims to integrate the Ethereum Economy into the daily life of consumers globally.
41	Waves platform	Blockchain	Independent	May 31, 2016	—N/a	$16,436,095	Waves (stylised WAVES) is a non-permissioned, non-privatized blockchain that intends to deal with banks national currencies. It raised 2 million in 24 hours and has a partnership with the Mycelium wallet. It raised 29,636 bitcoins.
42	Neon Odyssey	Tabletop role-playing game	Kickstarter	June 4, 2026	$60k	$16,138,971	Neon Odyssey is a supplement for Dungeons & Dragons 5th Edition, built around bringing space opera and science fiction to D&D.
43	Qtum	Blockchain	hybrid blockchain platform	March 21, 2017.	—N/a	$15,664,829.30	Qtum [pronounced Quantum] is a hybrid blockchain platform that runs the EVM on bitcoins core allowing smart contracts to exist in a mobile environment.
44	Brandon Sanderson's Cosmere RPG	Tabletop role-playing game	Kickstarter	Aug 29, 2024	$250K	$15,027,399	The Cosmere RPG is an original tabletop RPG. Developed by Brotherwise Games, initially covering the world of The Stormlight Archive (Roshar), and expanding to Mistborn (Scadrial) and beyond.
45	Cofound.it	Blockchain	Ethereum	June 7, 2017	56565 ETH ($~14.8M)	$14,700,000	A distributed VC ecosystem. Cofound.it is a distributed global platform that connects exceptional startups, experts and investors worldwide. It will first be built by the blockchain community for the blockchain community — and then for the whole world.
46	Coolest Cooler	Computing hardware	Kickstarter	Aug 29, 2014	$50K	$13,285,226	Portable 60 quart cooler designed by Ryan Grepper that contains a battery powered rechargeable blender, waterproof Bluetooth speaker, USB charger, cutting board, plates, among other features.
47	Flow Hive	Food	Indiegogo	Apr 19, 2015	$70K	$13,289,097	Flow Hive is a new type of domesticated bee hive box with a valve, where the beekeeper can extract honey from the hive without disturbing the bees.
48	Frosthaven	Board game	Kickstarter	May 1, 2020	$500K	$12,969,608	Fantasy cooperative board game and the sequel to Gloomhaven.
49	Ubuntu Edge	Computing hardware	Indiegogo	Aug 21, 2013	$32M	$12,814,196	The Ubuntu Edge was a proposed "high concept" smartphone announced by Canonical Ltd. on 22 July 2013.
50	Shroud of the Avatar: Forsaken Virtues	Video game	Kickstarter, Independent, Steam Early Access	Ongoing	$1M	$12,658,636	Richard Garriott returns to the fantasy RPG genre. Of the total amount, $1,919,275 was raised on Kickstarter.
51	Kingdom Death: Monster 1.5	Board game	Kickstarter	January 7, 2017	—N/a	$12,393,139	A massive cooperative board game about survival in a nightmare-horror world. Original Kickstarter campaign that raised $2,049,721 was surpassed in 2 hours.
52	Critical Role: The Legend of Vox Machina Animated Special	Animated series	Kickstarter	April 19, 2019	$750K	$11,385,449	Animated special based on the web series Critical Role which was funded in one hour and then was expanded to a ten episodes animated series after reaching stretch goals. When the campaign closed, it was one of the most quickly funded in Kickstarter history, and was the most funded Kickstarter for TV and film projects. In November 2019, Amazon Prime Video announced that they had acquired the streaming rights to The Legend of Vox Machina, and had commissioned 14 additional episodes (two additional episodes for season 1 and a second season of 12 episodes).
53	BLUETTI AC500 & B300S - Home Backup Power Station	Energy and Green Tech	Indiegogo	Oct 30, 2022	$10,000	$11,515,988	Bluetti AC500 & B300S was officially launched on Indiegogo on September 2. Until the end of the project on October 29, the total raised amount reached $11.7 million, and the number of people participating in the project was 4,632.
54	ICONOMI Digital Assets Management platform	Other	Ethereum	Sep 29, 2016	2000 BTC ($~1.2M)	$10,682,516.42	ICONOMI Digital Assets Management platform enables simple access to a variety of digital assets and combined Digital Asset Arrays.
55	BauBax	Other	Kickstarter, Indiegogo	September 2015	$20K	$10,271,965	The campaign was launched on July 7, 2015. By August 2015, BauBax had raised $3.7 million and was the most funded clothing project in Kickstarter history. By September 11, 2015, it had raised $9.7 million. The Travel Jacket comes with 15 unique features including a built-in Neck Pillow, Eye Mask, Gloves, Earphone Holders, Drink Pocket and Tech Pockets of all sizes. Available in four styles: hoodie/sweatshirt, fleece lined bomber, wrinkle free blazer with removable hoodie, and a windbreaker.
56	Pebble	Smartwatch	Kickstarter	May 18, 2012	$100K	$10,266,845	E-Paper smartwatch. Third highest funded project on Kickstarter.Shipping to backers began on 23 Jan 2013.
57	Avatar Legends: The Roleplaying Game	Tabletop role-playing game	Kickstarter	Sep 3, 2021	$50K	$9,535,317	A tabletop role-playing game developed by Magpie Games, based on the animated series Avatar: The Last Airbender and The Legend of Korra. The game is built on the Powered by the Apocalypse framework.
58	Modular Gaming Table	Furniture	Kickstarter	Oct 10, 2020	$1M	$8,808,136	A customizable table designed for tabletop and role-playing gamers designed by Taunton, Massachusetts-based woodworking company and gaming accessory manufacturer Wyrmwood Gaming. The table is a convertible platform allowing it to be used as either a coffee table or a dining table with removable toppers and magnetic rails along the edge that can hold different table accessories meant for gaming. The project hit its target goal of $1,000,000 in just ten minutes and raised $4,000,000 in its first day. It was the second-most funded tabletop gaming project on Kickstarter for the year 2020. As of February 21, 2021, it is the tenth most-successfully funded project on Kickstarter.
59	Exploding Kittens	Board game	Kickstarter	Feb 19, 2015	$10K	$8,782,571	Card game featuring exploding kittens, designed by Elan Lee, Matthew Inman, and Shane Small. The project hit its primary goal in only 8 minutes, exceeded $100,000 (10x its goal) in less than one hour, $1,000,000 (100x its goal) in less than 8 hours, and $2,000,000 (200x its goal) in just over 24 hours. By January 28, 2015, it passed 107,000 backers, making it the most backed Kickstarter to date.
60	MoonDAO	Science	Juicebox, Ethereum	Jan 16, 2022	—N/a	$8,745,007 (in ETH)	A decentralized autonomous organization which raised 2,623 ETH in one month to fund challenges which accelerate progress towards a lunar settlement. MoonDAO sponsored a seat for Dude Perfect cofounder Coby Cotton aboard Blue Origin NS-22.
61	Golem	Blockchain	Ethereum, Independent	Nov 11, 2016	$8.6M	$8,600,000	Distributed, open sourced, supercomputer built on the Ethereum network. Made up of a global sharing economy network of computers that 'rent' out their computing power. Project hit its goal in 29 minutes.
62	Ouya	Video game console	Kickstarter	Aug 9, 2012	$950K	$8,596,474	Android-based video game console. Industrial design by Yves Béhar. Highest funded video game project entirely funded on Kickstarter. Development units began shipping in March 2013. Officially released in June 2013.
63	Gut Weißenhaus	Other	Companisto	Mar 27, 2015	$2M	$8,148,450	Real estate
64	Snapmaker 2.0: Modular 3-in-1 3D Printers	3D printing	Kickstarter	Jun 6, 2019	$10K	$7,850,866	Snapmaker 2.0 is a modular 3-in-1 3D printer, which has 3D printing, laser engraving, cutting, and CNC carving function. The project reached its funding goal in less than 1 minute. It also became the fastest ever project to raise $1m on Kickstarter, at just 7 minutes. It eventually raised over 7.8M USD, making it the most funded Technology project in Kickstarter history.
65	Lands of Evershade	Board game	Gamefound	Dec 5, 2024	$50,000	$7,415,330.35	Hybrid RPG/board game that merges storytelling with a dice-based RPG system and fast tactical combat. Fully funded in 1 minute and 2 seconds, with 85 different "stretch goals" unlocked through the duration of the campaign.
66	Shenmue III	Video game	Kickstarter, Independent	Sep 1, 2018	$2M	$7,063,329	$6,333,295 was raised on Kickstarter, making Shenmue III the highest-funded video game project in Kickstarter history.
67	The Wingfeather Saga	TV series	Angel Studios, Kickstarter	Ongoing	$10.1M	$6,979,041	TV series based on the children's book series of the same name. The value comprises $265,880 of $110,000 goal for a pilot episode, $4,997,000 of $5,000,000 max for Season 1 and $1,715,738 of $5,000,000 max for Season 2.
68	The Guild Ren Faire'd	Movie	Kickstarter	Aug 21, 2026	$1,500,000	$6,820,719	Stretch goals included two music videos starring Felicia Day, and 10 episodes of Conludo, a new web show with Wil Wheaton and Felicia Day where they play board games with each other and friends.
69	The Way of Kings, Leatherbound Edition	Publishing	Kickstarter	Aug 7, 2020	$250,000	$6,788,517	The response to this was significantly higher than Dragonsteel Entertainment anticipated. The "stretch goals" had to be adjusted multiple times, and then more were added after everything was reached in the first 6 hours. It was fully funded in 3 minutes, and reached over a million dollars within 10. At the time the campaign ended, it was the most funded Kickstarter campaign in the Publishing category, and the 14th over all of Kickstarter history.
70	Mystery Science Theater 3000	Series	Kickstarter	May 7, 2021	$5.5M	$6,518,912	Raised to fund season 13 of Mystery Science Theater 3000 and the creation of the Gizmoplex, an online platform to show these new episodes as well as to show reruns of past episodes and host live events.
71	FirstBlood Crowdsale	Software	Ethereum	Sep 26, 2016	$5,500,000	$6,267,767.32	FirstBlood is the first decentralized app, built on top of Ethereum, that allows eSports enthusiasts to compete in their favorite games through a decentralized, automated platform. The FirstBlood Token ("1SŦ"), sold during its crowdsale, is a utility token that can be used on FirstBlood's decentralized software. The campaign raised over $5 million in less than five minutes.
72	Pono Music	Computing hardware	Kickstarter	Apr 15, 2014	$800K	$6,225,354	Digital music player using the FLAC audio file format under development by musician Neil Young and his company Pono Music.
73	Mayday PAC	Other	Independent	Jul 4, 2014	$6M	$6,132,554	Super PAC founded by Lawrence Lessig with the purpose of pushing for a United States Congress dedicated to reforming campaign finance laws by 2016. The crowdfunding round took place in two cycles. The first $1M goal was started on May 1, and was reached on May 13, and the second, $5M goal was started on June 4 and was reached on July 4, at 9:30 pm EST - 9 hours short of the deadline of 6 am, July 5, EST (or midnight in Hawaii.) After the crowdfunding deadline, Mayday PAC raised an additional $4M from large donors. As of May 22, 2016, Mayday PAC is the largest crowdfunding campaign for non-profit purposes.
74	Lucyd	Blockchain, Wearable technology	Ethereum	Feb 28, 2019	$6m	$6,100,000	Community-driven augmented reality project. Has since launched an eshop for advanced eyewear. Developing blockchain apps for augmented reality.
75	Fidget Cube	Other	Kickstarter	Oct 19, 2016	$15K	$6,038,945	A desk toy designed to help users focus.
76	Mystery Science Theater 3000	Series	Kickstarter	Dec 11, 2015	$2M	$5,764,229	$5,764,229 from 48,270 backers, with an additional $600,000 in backer add-ons to film season 11 of Mystery Science Theater 3000
77	Veronica Mars	Movie	Kickstarter	Apr 13, 2013	$2M	$5,702,153	Feature-length film continuation of the Veronica Mars television series.
78	Lisk	Software	Bitcoin, Independent	Mar 21, 2016	—N/a	$5,700,000	Lisk is a crypto-currency and decentralized application platform. As a crypto-currency it provides a decentralized payment system and digital money network. The Lisk decentralized application platform allows the deployment, distribution and monetisation of decentralized applications and custom blockchains (sidechains) onto the Lisk blockchain.
79	Bloodstained: Ritual of the Night	Video game	Kickstarter	Jun 12, 2015	$500,000	$5,545,991	Metroidvania video game, by former Castlevania producer Koji Igarashi. Succeeded Torment: Tides of Numenera as the highest funded Kickstarter video game, was succeeded by Shenmue III in July 2015.
80	DigixDAO Crowdsale	Blockchain	Ethereum	Mar 30, 2016	$500K	$5,500,000	DigixDAO crowdsale offered DGD tokens. The sale concluded in a mere 12 hours as the maximum was reached.
81	The Grid	Software	Independent	Ongoing	$70K	$5,489,376	Website builder that uses Artificial intelligence algorithms to design and build websites based on content.
82	Project Bring Back Reading Rainbow for Every Child, Everywhere	Movie	Kickstarter	Jul 2, 2014	$1M	$5,408,916	Make the iPad version of Reading Rainbow available on the web, other mobile devices, game consoles, and set-top boxes. In addition, create a classroom version and provide subscriptions for up to 7,500 disadvantaged classrooms for free.
83	Chronicles of Elyria	Video game	Kickstarter, Independent	Mar 24, 2020	$900k	$6,192,308	MMORPG survival game by Soulbound Studios. After the studio laid off its staff in 2020, development continued on a pro bono basis until its closure in 2026.
84	Décarbonons la France !	Lobbying, Climate change	Ulule	June 27, 2025	$351,645 (300k €)	$5,432,878 (€4,634,968)	Led by the French think tank The Shift Project. The project aims to develop concrete proposals for the decarbonization of France and to weight in the public debate of the 2027 French presidential election.
85	Augur	Blockchain	Ethereum, Independent	October 1, 2015	none	$5,133,000	An open-source, decentralized prediction market built using Blockchain technology.
86	VitaDAO	Science	Ethereum, Independent	June 23, 2021	$2,000,000	$5,100,000	VitaDAO is a decentralized autonomous organization (DAO) that funds and supports longevity science research.
87	Restore King Chapel Now. Every Day & Dollar Counts	Other	Indiegogo	May 22, 2015	$8M	$5,048,213	Restore Martin Luther King Jr. International Chapel, the only religious building named after Dr. King located at Morehouse College.
88	An Hour of Code for Every Student	Other	Indiegogo	Dec 15, 2014	$5M	$5,024,281	Every student in every school should have the opportunity to learn computer science at Code.org.
89	Mastercoin	Software	Bitcoin, Independent	Sep 1, 2013	—N/a	$5,000,000	Mastercoin is a digital currency and communications protocol built on the Bitcoin block chain. It is one of several efforts to enable complex financial functions in a cryptocurrency.

== See also ==
- List of highest-funded equity crowdfunding projects
- Kickstarter § Top projects by funds raised
- Indiegogo § Top projects by funds raised
- List of video game crowdfunding projects
