= Latrell Mitchell =

Australian international rugby league footballer (born 1997)

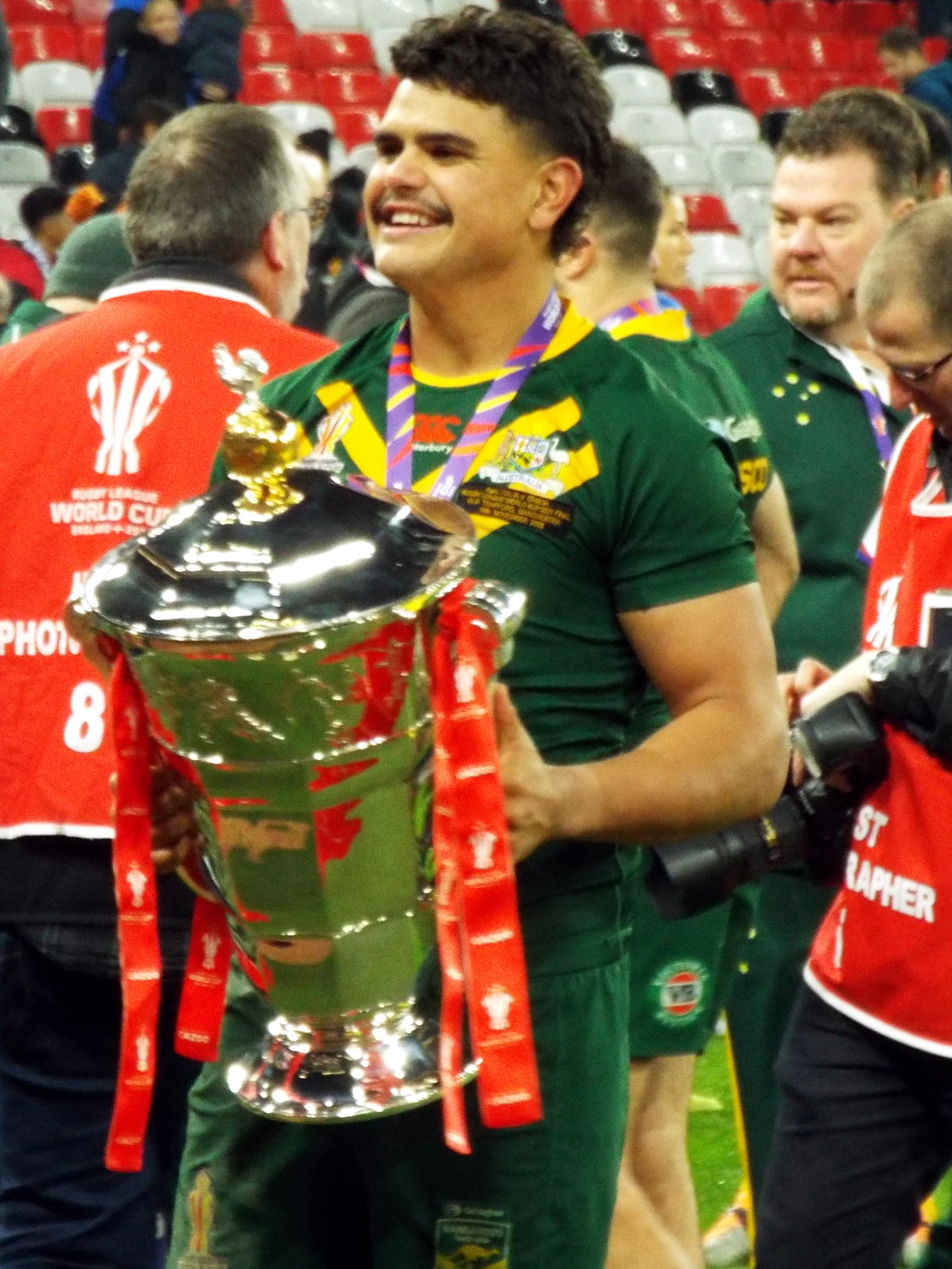

Personal information
- Born: Latrell Goolagong; 16 June 1997 (age 29) Taree, New South Wales, Australia
- Height: 195 cm (6 ft 5 in)
- Weight: 105 kg (16 st 7 lb)

Playing information
- Position: Fullback, Centre, Five-eighth
Club
Years	Team	Pld	T	G	FG	P
2016–19	Sydney Roosters	96	65	209	1	679
2020–	South Sydney	98	55	229	5	686
	Total	194	120	438	6	1365
Representative
Years	Team	Pld	T	G	FG	P
2017–24	Indigenous All Stars	6	0	5	0	10
2018–25	New South Wales	11	7	4	0	36
2018–	Australia	10	5	6	0	32
- Source: As of 20 November 2026
- Relatives: Shaquai Mitchell (brother)

Latrell Mitchell (né Goolagong; born 16 June 1997) is an Australian professional rugby league footballer who plays as a fullback for the South Sydney Rabbitohs in the National Rugby League (NRL). He has also represented both New South Wales in the State of Origin series and Australia at international level as a centre.

Mitchell began his NRL career with the Sydney Roosters and was a member of the 2018 and 2019 NRL Grand Final championship rosters as a centre. Additionally, he has represented the Indigenous All Stars. He played on the wing early in his career and has also played five-eighth on occasion.

== Background ==
Mitchell (né Goolagong) was born in Taree on the Mid North Coast region of New South Wales, and is of Indigenous Australian descent from the Biripi and Wiradjuri people. He attended Chatham High School and played junior rugby league for the Taree Red Rovers as well as Group 3 Rugby League under-18s for Taree City club.

== Playing career ==
=== Early career ===
==== 2013–2014 ====
In 2013 and 2014, Mitchell played for the New South Wales under-16s and under-18s teams, respectively. Mitchell played for the Roosters' S. G. Ball Cup team during the 2014 season, where he was named as the S. G. Ball Player of the Year, and the man-of-the-match in the S. G. Ball Grand Final.

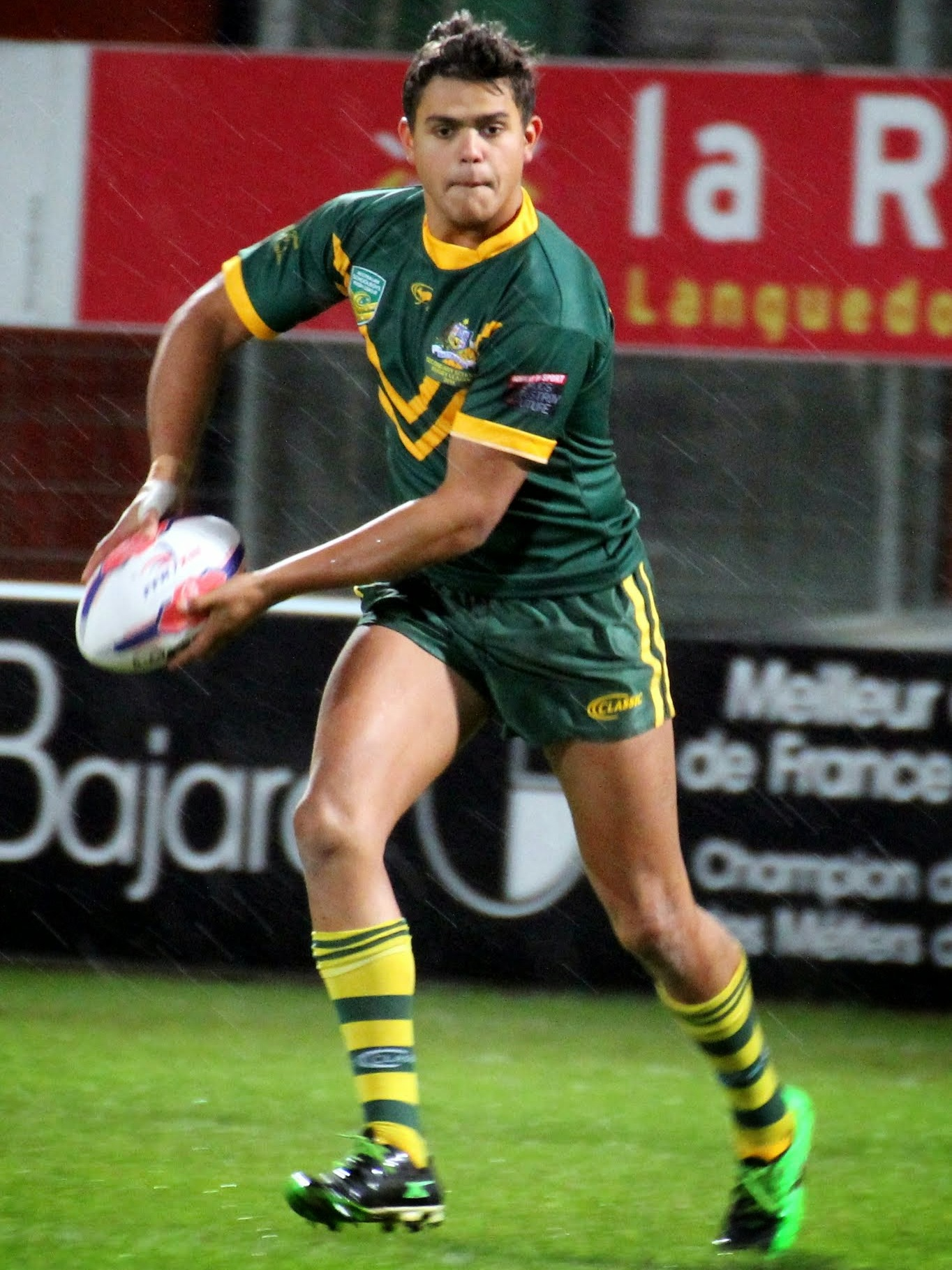
Mitchell playing for the Australian Schoolboys in 2014

In November 2014, Mitchell was selected for the Australian Schoolboys team for their tour of England and France. He scored thirteen tries in seven games and was named player of the series.

==== 2015 ====
Mitchell played in the Roosters' NYC team during the 2015 season. On 16 June 2015, he re-signed with the club until the end of the 2019 season. On 8 July 2015, Mitchell played at fullback for the New South Wales under-20s team and scored a try in the 32–16 win at Lang Park. On 14 September 2015, Mitchell was named on the interchange bench in the 2015 NYC Team of the Year.

=== Sydney Roosters ===
==== 2016 ====
Mitchell was named in the Roosters' 2016 NRL Auckland Nines squad. During the tournament, he scored four tries in three games.

Mitchell also played in the Roosters' 2016 World Club Series win against St Helens.

In Round 1 of the 2016 NRL season, he made his NRL debut for the Roosters against the South Sydney Rabbitohs and subsequently played in every game of the season, finishing with fourteen tries as the team's leading try and point scorer.

==== 2017 ====
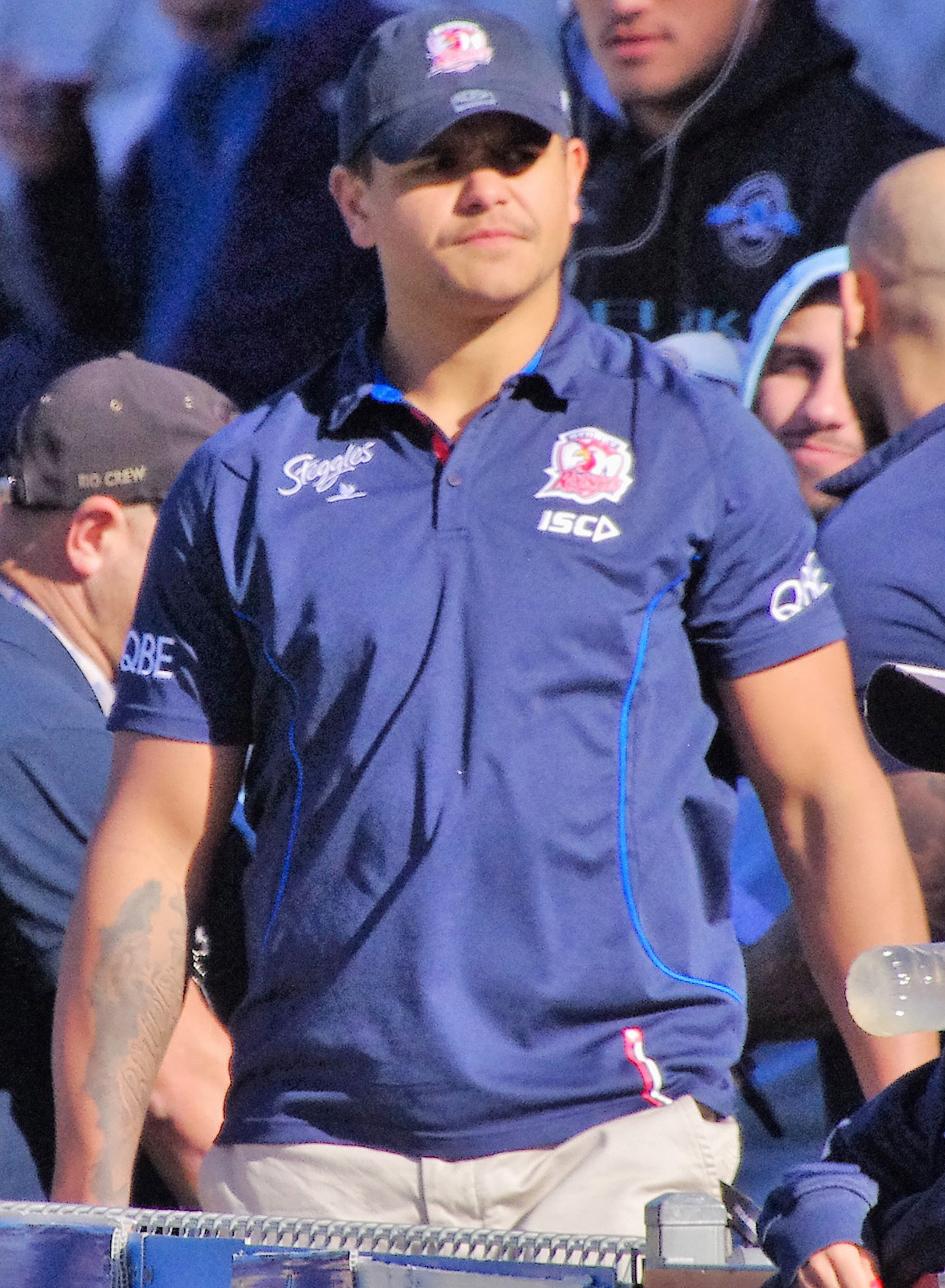
Mitchell representing the Sydney Roosters in 2017

In February, Mitchell played as an interchange in the 2017 All Stars match at McDonald Jones Stadium.

In the first round of the NRL season, Mitchell scored a hat-trick in the Roosters' 32–18 win over the Gold Coast Titans at Robina Stadium. He scored the game-winning try in week 1 of the 2017 finals against the Broncos. In the preliminary final against North Queensland, Mitchell endured a horror night which involved him sending two kick off restarts out on the full which both led to tries for the opposition. The Sydney Roosters lost the match 29–16 in what proved to be one of the upsets of the season.

==== 2018 ====
Mitchell was selected to play for New South Wales in The 2018 State of Origin series by coach Brad Fittler. He scored a try in the first match of the series. Mitchell also played in the next two games of the series; although New South Wales won the second game but lost the third, the side did win its first Origin shield since 2014.

In the NRL 2018 finals series, Mitchell was handed a one match suspension after being charged for a crusher tackle on Josh Dugan in the Roosters victory over Cronulla. Mitchell subsequently missed the preliminary final victory over Souths. On 30 September, Mitchell played in the 2018 NRL Grand Final against the Melbourne Storm scoring a try in the 14th minute and kicking four goals in the Sydney Roosters 21–6 win.

At the National Dreamtime Awards 2018, Mitchell was named Male Sportsperson of the Year.

==== 2019 ====
In February, Mitchell played as a centre in the 2019 All Stars match at AAMI Park and kicked three out of seven goals.

In round 6 of the 2019 NRL season, Mitchell scored a try and kicked the winning field goal as the Sydney Roosters defeated Melbourne 21–20 in golden point extra time. In round 8, Mitchell scored a hat-trick and kicked seven goals as the Sydney Roosters defeated Wests Tigers 42–12 at the Sydney Cricket Ground.

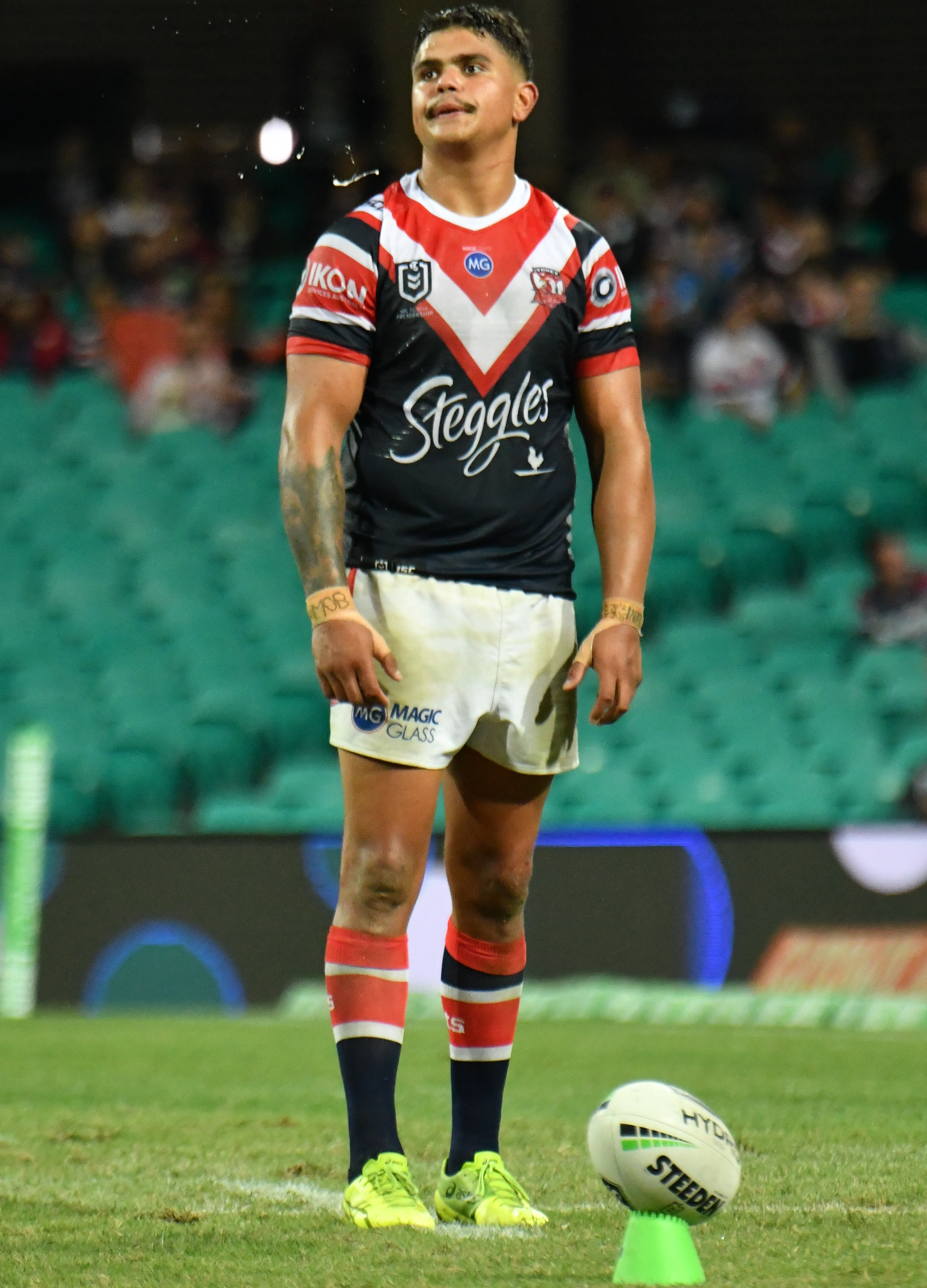
Mitchell kicking at goal for the Sydney Roosters in 2019

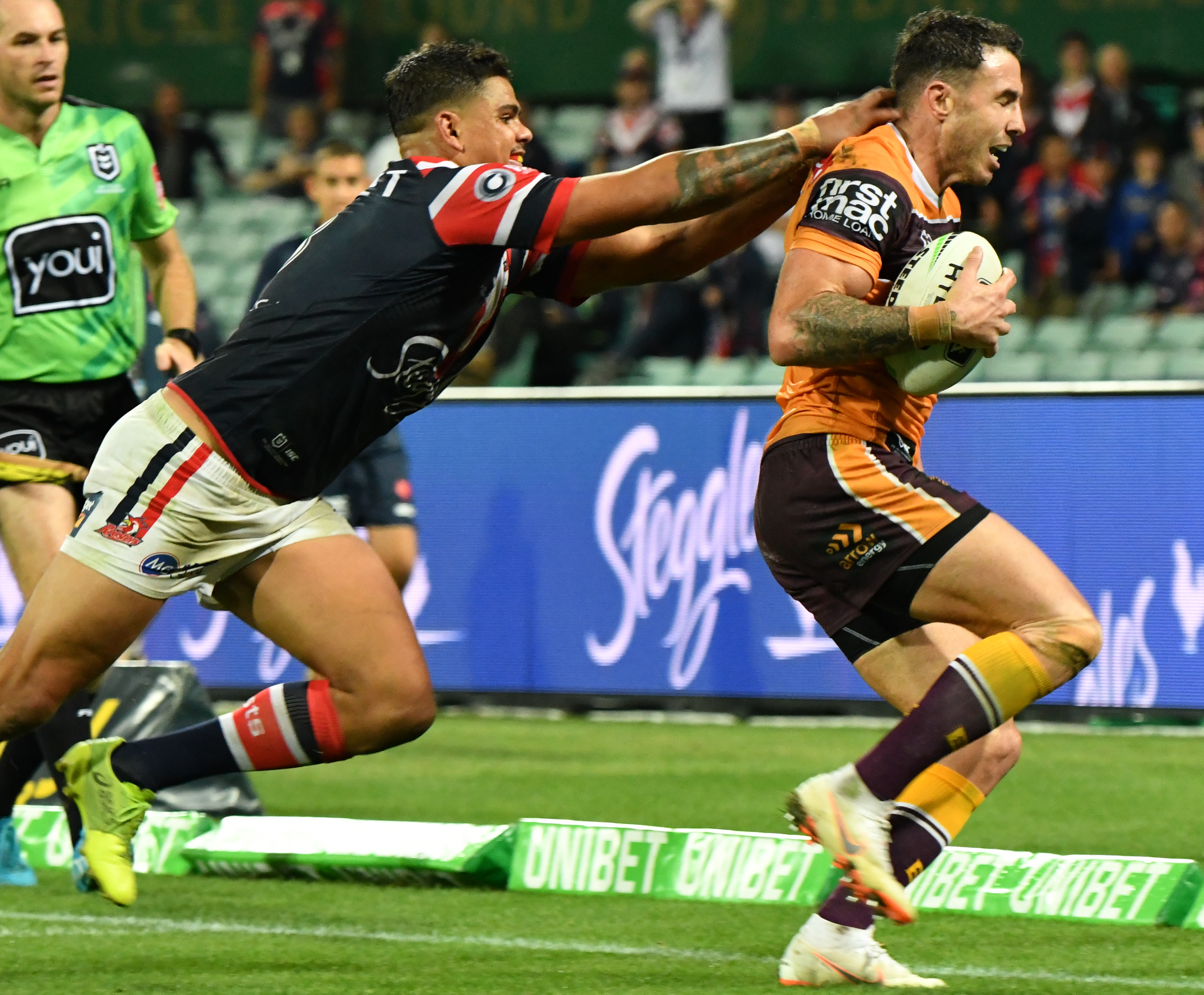
Mitchell grabbing Darius Boyd of the Brisbane Broncos in 2019

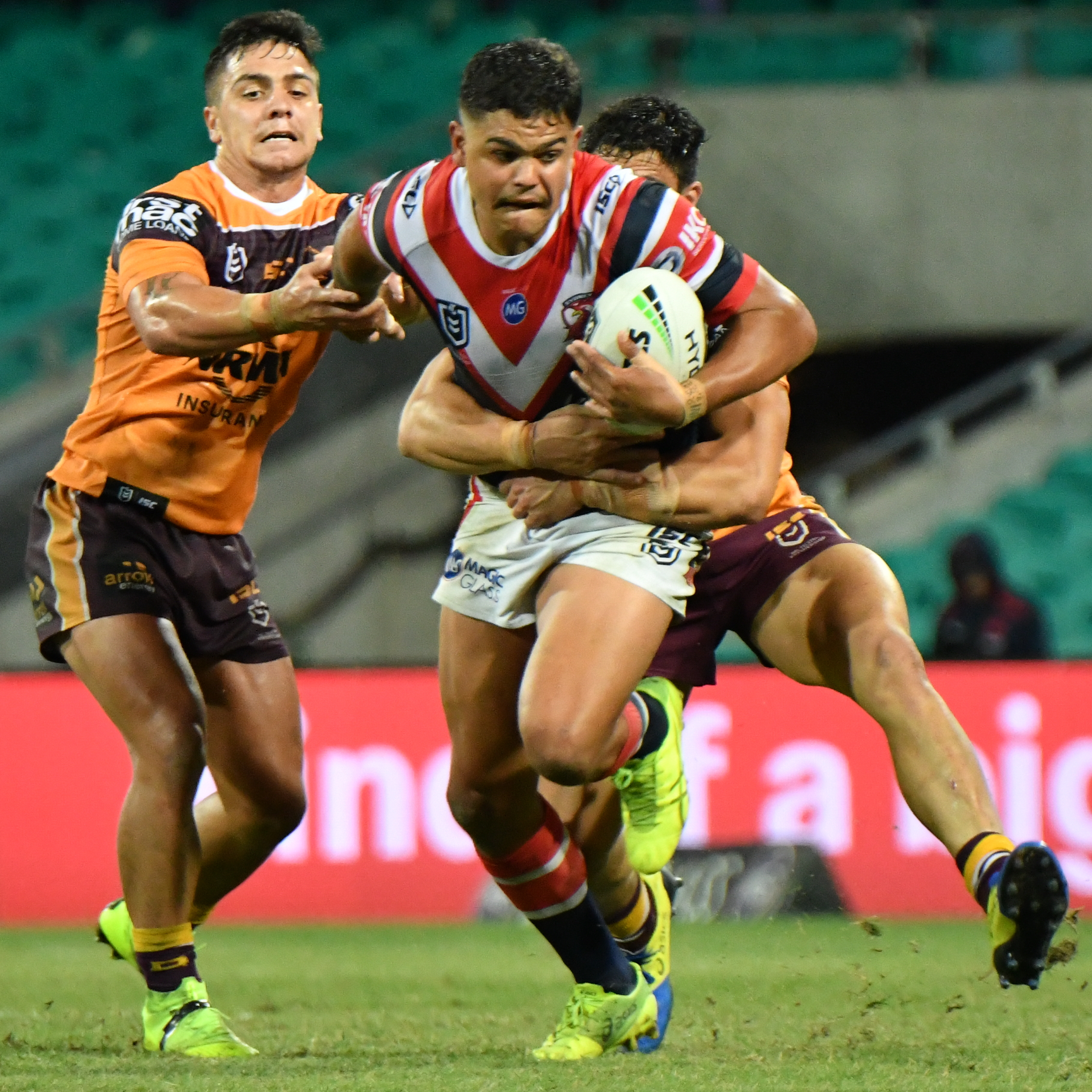
Mitchell being tackled by Brisbane players Kodi Nikorima and Kotoni Staggs in 2019

In Game 1 of the 2019 State of Origin series, Mitchell was sin binned for a professional foul on Matt Gillett in the 58th minute, and dropped for the subsequent games.

In round 14 against the Bulldogs, Mitchell scored two tries and kicked five goals in a 38–12 victory at the Sydney Cricket Ground. In round 18 against Newcastle, Mitchell scored a try and kicked eight goals as the Sydney Roosters won the match 48–10 at the Sydney Cricket Ground. In round 20 against the Gold Coast, Mitchell scored two tries and kicked nine goals as the Sydney Roosters won the match 58–6 at the Sydney Cricket Ground. In round 22 against the New Zealand Warriors, Mitchell scored two tries and kicked five goals. The Sydney Roosters won the match 42–6 at the Sydney Cricket Ground.

On 2 October, Mitchell was named as the Dally M centre of the year at the Dally M Awards ceremony. Mitchell played at centre in the club's 2019 NRL Grand Final victory over the Canberra Raiders at ANZ Stadium.

On 25 October, Mitchell kicked four goals for Australia's 26–4 victory over New Zealand in the Oceania Cup.

=== South Sydney Rabbitohs ===
==== 2020 ====
In January, Mitchell's manager Matt Rose brokered a transfer for him from the Sydney Roosters to the South Sydney Rabbitohs on a one-year deal worth $600,000 with the club having the option of committing by 30 April to the 2021 season for a reported $800,000.

In February, Mitchell played as fullback in the 2020 All Stars match at Cbus Super Stadium.

Mitchell made his debut for South Sydney in round 1 of the 2020 NRL season against Cronulla-Sutherland. However, he was benched by coach Wayne Bennett after fifty-five minutes of play. In round 5, Mitchell scored his first try for South Sydney when they defeated the Gold Coast Titans 32–12 at Western Sydney Stadium. In round 15, Mitchell scored two tries and kicked one goal in a 56–16 victory over Manly-Warringah at ANZ Stadium. In round 16, Mitchell was taken from the field with a hamstring injury during Souths 38–0 victory over Parramatta, and was later ruled out for the season.

==== 2021 ====
In January, Mitchell reportedly signed a two-year contract extension worth around $875,000 per season until the end of 2023 with South Sydney through his new manager Warwick Wright after former manager Matt Rose allowed his own accreditation as an agent to lapse.

In February, Mitchell played as fullback in the 2021 All Stars match at North Queensland Stadium and kicked two goals.

In round 5 of the 2021 NRL season, Mitchell scored two tries and kicked a field goal in South Sydney's 35–6 victory over Brisbane. On 20 April, Mitchell was suspended for four weeks after being charged over two incidents during South Sydney's victory over the Wests Tigers in round 6. The incidents involved Mitchell lashing out at Wests player Luke Garner with his boot, and a late hit to the head of David Nofoaluma. Mitchell was also fined $3000 by the NRL and ruled ineligible for a 2021 Dally M Medal due to this suspension.

Mitchell played for New South Wales in all three games in the 2021 State of Origin series. He scored two tries and kicked one goal in Game 1.

In round 20, Mitchell scored two tries for South Sydney in a 50–14 victory over the St. George Illawarra Dragons. In round 24, Mitchell scored two tries for South Sydney in a 54–12 victory over the Sydney Roosters. However, his season ended when sin-binned for an illegal shoulder charge on Roosters player Joseph Manu, who left the field with a fractured cheekbone. Mitchell subsequently took an early plea after being charged with a grade two reckless high tackle charge and was suspended for six matches (675 points). Without his prior offences, Mitchell would have been offered a four-week ban. Consequently, Mitchell missed playing in the 2021 finals series and the 2021 NRL Grand Final against the Penrith Panthers.

On 1 September 2021, NSW State of Origin coach Brad Fittler warned that Mitchell could "end up shortening his career" if unable to stay out of trouble on the field. Two months later, "Latrell Mitchell took out the True Blue Award, which is judged by the (NSW) coaching staff and goes to a player who displays qualities upon which the team culture is built."

==== 2022 ====
The balance of Mitchell's 2021 six-week suspension carried forward into 2022. This ruled him ineligible to play in the Indigenous All-Stars annual representative exhibition match as well as round 1 of the 2022 NRL season. In round 2, Melbourne defeated South Sydney 15–14 at AAMI Park. Although Mitchell missed his three conversion attempts for Souths, he did kick a two-point field goal in the 80th minute to send the match into golden point extra time. In round 3, Mitchell kicked four goals and scored one try for South Sydney in a 28–16 victory over the Sydney Roosters. In round 4, Penrith defeated South Sydney 26–12 at Penrith Stadium. Mitchell kicked two goals.

Prior to round 5, South Sydney head coach Jason Demetriou revealed that Mitchell "was battling a knee injury". In round 5, Mitchell only played during the first fifteen minutes. He scored a try for Souths against the St. George Illawarra Dragons at Stadium Australia. In later play, he suffered a hamstring injury after being tackled, and left the field. Mitchell was expected to be sidelined for eight weeks. After round 5, his official NRL goal kicking conversion rate for the 2022 season was 54.6% and for defence, 82.4% tackle efficiency.

In round 16, Mitchell returned from injury and kicked five goals for South Sydney in a 30–12 victory over the Parramatta Eels at Accor Stadium. In round 17, Mitchell stood in as captain and kicked six out of eight goals for South Sydney in their 40–28 victory over the Newcastle Knights at McDonald Jones Stadium. In the 18th minute, he was placed on report for high contact to the head of Newcastle winger Dominic Young. In round 20, Cronulla defeated South Sydney 21–20 at PointsBet Stadium. Mitchell missed three field goal attempts in golden point extra time.

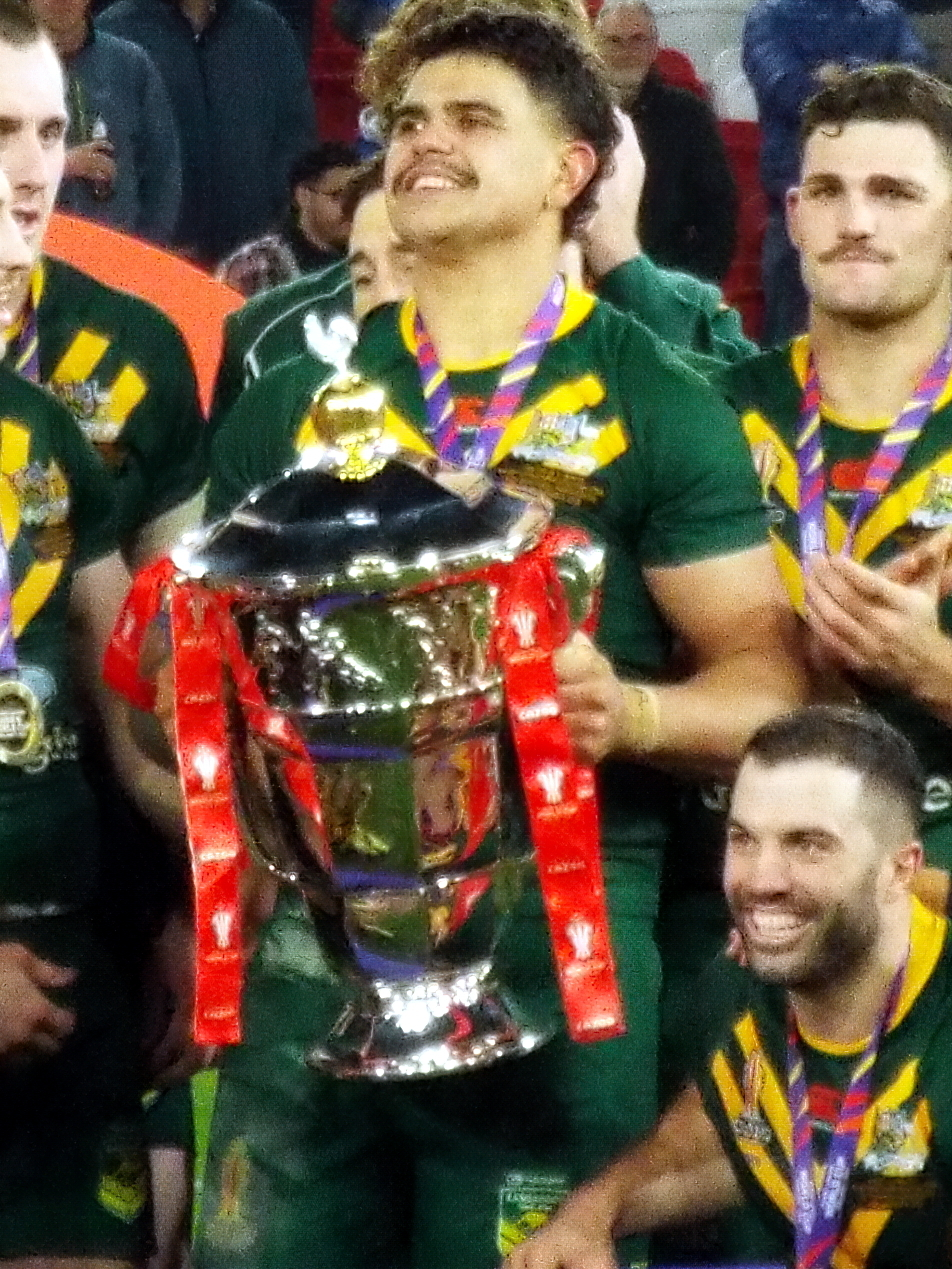
Mitchell with the RLWC trophy in 2022

Instead of attending training on the Tuesday morning prior to round 25, Mitchell went to his northern NSW farm "to recharge his batteries ahead of the finals" the following week. In round 25, he successfully kicked two of three conversion goal attempts for South Sydney in their 26–16 loss to the Sydney Roosters at Sydney Football Stadium. In the 70th minute, Mitchell was sin-binned for ten minutes for deliberately impeding the play the ball off the back of repeat set restarts.

The following week, Mitchell kicked five goals and scored one try for South Sydney in a 30–14 elimination final victory over Sydney Roosters at Allianz Stadium. Then, in semi final 2 on 17 September, Mitchell kicked seven goals for South Sydney in their 38–12 victory over Cronulla at Allianz Stadium. On 24 September, Mitchell kicked two goals for South Sydney in their 32–12 preliminary final loss to Penrith at Accor Stadium.

In October, he was named in the Australia squad for the 2021 Rugby League World Cup.

==== 2023 ====
On 5 February 2023, Mitchell was arrested and charged in Canberra for fighting in a public place (with his distant cousin Jack Wighton), affray and resisting police. Mitchell was filmed crying out about pain in both shoulders while being arrested and was later reportedly visited by South Sydney's club doctor to check for any injuries. The NRL Integrity Unit investigated the incident but did not respond when asked if Mitchell would still play in the All Stars match on 11 February 2023. Nevertheless, Mitchell's management company subsequently released an apology on his behalf at Sydney airport on 6 February as he departed for New Zealand with the All Stars team. Mitchell was listed to appear in the Magistrates Court of the Australian Capital Territory on 22 February, one week prior to the commencement of the 2023 NRL season He pleaded not guilty, and the case was adjourned until 30 October—after the season finished. The ACT Police case collapsed and all charges against Mitchell and Wighton were dismissed on 1 November.

In round 6 against the Canterbury-Bankstown Bulldogs, Mitchell played his 150th first grade game, scored a hat-trick of tries and kicked seven goals in South Sydney's 50–16 victory. After round 12, Mitchell sustained a calf injury while training and did not play again until round 22. In August, Mitchell joined portable power station brand BLUETTI as their brand ambassador. A few days before round 25, he was filmed shotgunning beer onstage at a concert. Apart from successfully kicking one of two goal attempts, "two crucial errors" in round 25 led directly to opposition tries in South Sydney's 10–29 loss to the Newcastle Knights, and in the final minutes Mitchell was sin-binned for an elbow to the back of Tyson Frizell's head. Mitchell later conceded that this "grubby act has no place in the game". An early guilty plea to a Grade 2 Dangerous Contact charge resulted in a one-match suspension that ruled Mitchell out of playing in South Sydney's last game of the season. After round 25 in August, his official NRL goal kicking conversion rate for the 2023 season was 72.6% and for defence, 82.1% tackle efficiency.

==== 2024 ====
In round 2 of the 2024 NRL season, Mitchell scored his 100th NRL try in a 18–28 loss to the Brisbane Broncos. Afterwards, he swore repeatedly in a post-game interview with radio station Triple M, adding "I don't care if I'm swearing". NRL chief executive Andrew Abdo subsequently met with Mitchell and said players "have a responsibility to be respectful" while speaking publicly. No disciplinary action was taken against Mitchell.

After South Sydney's 20–16 win in round 4, Mitchell was retrospectively fined for a Grade 1 Dangerous Contact that caused Canterbury-Bankstown Bulldogs winger Josh Addo-Carr to fall face-first on the ground and lose consciousness while trying to score.

In round 5 against the New Zealand Warriors, Mitchell was put on report twice in Souths' 4–34 loss. The first incident was a grade-two dangerous contact with a raised elbow to the head of Shaun Johnson who tried to tackle him. Mitchell entered an early guilty plea and was suspended for three matches. South Sydney officials reportedly told Mitchell that he must stay in Sydney during the three-week suspension, rather than travel to his farm for downtime in Taree. According to Fox League, Mitchell was not "at his brilliant best" in matches played soon after suspension.

In round 12 (NRL Indigenous Round), Mitchell captained South Sydney but was sin-binned in the first half for a hip drop tackle on Parramatta Eels centre Sean Russell. Charged with a Grade 1 Dangerous Contact offence, Mitchell avoided potential suspension by entering an early guilty plea and was fined $3,000. In round 15 against the Brisbane Broncos, Mitchell was sin-binned for escalating a melee. After entering an early guilty plea, he was fined $3,000 for contrary conduct.

In Game 2 of the 2024 State of Origin series, Mitchell played as a centre and scored a try for New South Wales in their 38–18 victory over Queensland at the Melbourne Cricket Ground. After the match, Mitchell was charged with a Grade 1 Careless High Tackle on Xavier Coates and received a fine equating to seven per cent of his match payment. The following week in South Sydney's NRL round 18 match against the Parramatta Eels, Mitchell reportedly injured his foot. Mitchell's official NRL goal kicking conversion rate for the 2024 season was 71.7% and for defence, 76.7% tackle efficiency. Prior to round 24, South Sydney put him on leave for the remainder of the season due to the combination of ongoing foot recovery and a white powder scandal.

==== White powder scandal ====
On 15 August 2024, the NRL issued Mitchell with a Breach Notice alleging a breach of the NRL Code of Conduct after an NRL Integrity Unit investigation into a photo of him hunched over a table with a white substance. Mitchell was deemed to have brought the game into disrepute and given five business days to respond. A one-match ban and a $20,000 fine was subsequently imposed by the NRL. Meanwhile, the South Sydney Rabbitohs issued Mitchell with a show-cause notice to explain his involvement in the white substance photo. This resulted in South Sydney additionally fining him $100,000, however $80,000 was suspended "pending any further breach of his playing contract or wellbeing program".

==== 2025 ====
Mitchell's one-match NRL suspension from late 2024 was to be applied in round 1 of the 2025 NRL season. However in January 2025, the NRL ruled that Mitchell could use the All Stars match on 15 February towards his suspension, thus making him eligible to play in round 1. Selected to play in the final week of the 2025 NRL Pre-season Challenge, Mitchell incurred a hamstring injury at training.

He returned to play in round 5, and South Sydney head coach Wayne Bennett positioned him as a centre. In the subsequent two rounds, Mitchell played as five-eighth. For round 8 against the Melbourne Storm, he was named as fullback. In the fiftieth minute, Mitchell was sin-binned for a Grade 2 Dangerous Contact high tackle on Sualauvi Fa'alogo, and suspended for one match. After playing all three games for New South Wales in the 2025 State of Origin series, Mitchell sustained a quadriceps injury at Rabbitohs' training for round 20 and was sidelined until round 23. From that match, a pinched nerve in his back prevented him from playing in the next round.

==== 2026 ====
Mitchell returned from injury to play in round 1 of the 2026 NRL season. In round 3 against the Wests Tigers, he was penalised (and later fined $1000) for a Careless High Tackle – Grade 1 on Heamasi Makasini. This resulted in two shots at goal for a rare eight-point try because the foul play occurred during the act of scoring a try. After round 6 against the Canberra Raiders at Optus Stadium, Mitchell was fined $1800 for a Careless High Tackle – Grade 1 on Simi Sasagi. Due to a lower back injury sustained in round 9 against the Newcastle Knights, Mitchell missed the next round. Late in round 11 against the Dolphins, he left the field with back pain and did not play in round 12. Mitchell returned as an interchange player in round 26 against the Gold Coast Titans, and received a $1,000 fine for a Careless High Tackle – Grade 1 on Keano Kini. The following week against the Sydney Roosters, he scored a try and kicked five goals from ten attempts. In the first week of the finals, Mitchell kicked one goal as South Sydney were eliminated after a 20-10 loss to the Newcastle Kinights at Allianz Stadium.

== Statistics ==
Year	Team	Games	Tries	Goals	FGs	Pts
2016	Sydney Roosters	24	14	12		80
2017	Sydney Roosters	23	15	9		78
2018	Sydney Roosters	24	17	90		248
2019	Sydney Roosters	25	19	98	1	273
2020	South Sydney Rabbitohs	14	4	5		26
2021	South Sydney Rabbitohs	17	13	7	1	67
2022	South Sydney Rabbitohs	17	7	61	1	152
2023	South Sydney Rabbitohs	16	9	53	1	143
2024	South Sydney Rabbitohs	11	8	33		98
2025	South Sydney Rabbitohs	11	2	28	1	66
2026	South Sydney Rabbitohs	9	11	35	1	116
2027	South Sydney Rabbitohs					
	Totals	191	119	407	5	1321

== Honours ==
Representative

- Rugby League World Cup champion: 2026

== Personal life ==
Mitchell's registered birth name was Goolagong. His parents are Trish Goolagong and Matt Mitchell. His maternal great-aunt is former tennis player Evonne Goolagong Cawley. During his early teens, Latrell and his two brothers (Shaquai and Lionel) changed to their father's surname. Shaquai plays for the Tweed Head Seagulls. Mitchell and his long-term partner Brielle Mercy have three children.

Although players are not obliged to do so, prior to Game 1 of the 2019 State of Origin series, Mitchell announced that he would not sing the Australian National Anthem because it did not represent Aboriginal Australians.

On 27 April 2020, Mitchell was fined $1,000 by the NRL and placed under investigation after he broke strict lockdown protocols with fellow NRL player Josh Addo-Carr by going on a weekend camping trip during the COVID-19 pandemic. Addo-Carr was also investigated for use of a firearm. On 28 April, Mitchell was fined an additional $50,000 by the NRL for breaching strict self-isolation protocols and for bringing the game into disrepute. On 9 November, Taree Local Court sentenced Mitchell to a twelve-month conditional release order after he pleaded guilty to giving a firearm to a person not authorised by a licence or permit.

In August 2021, after Mitchell pleaded guilty and was suspended from the NRL for six matches, Mitchell's uncle Maurice Goolagong claimed that Mitchell "is struggling in the aftermath as his partner has been receiving death threats". A few days later, when a reporter asked how Mitchell was going, South Sydney head coach Wayne Bennett responded: "He's very well, thanks. I'm sure he'd appreciate you asking that." Bennett also confirmed that Mitchell was still physically with the team in the Queensland COVID bubble, particularly playing the role of the opposition as they do different training drills. The youth responsible for directing threats via social media was given a police caution.
