= VinSmart =

Member of Vingroup Joint Stock Company

VinSmart Research & Manufacturer Joint Stock Company
- Native name: Công ty cổ phần nghiên cứu và sản xuất VinSmart
- Company type: Division
- Traded as: VinSmart
- Founded: 12 June 2018; 8 years ago in Hanoi, Vietnam
- Founder: Pham Nhat Vuong
- Brands: Vsmart
- Parent: Vingroup

VinSmart Research & Manufacturer Joint Stock Company is a member of Vingroup Joint Stock Company – one of the biggest wholly owned conglomerates in Vietnam, specialising in Technology, Industry, Commercials & Services. VinSmart was established in June 2018.

VinSmart and its branding Vsmart are now largely unused brandnames of Vingroup due to the discontinuation of the respective conglomerate high-tech industry arms.

== History ==
VinSmart was founded in 2018 after the acquisition of BQ Company, with head office at Vinhomes Riverside, Long Biên District, Hanoi, Vietnam, first factory at Cát Hải District, Haiphong. The second factory was located at Hoa Lac Hi-tech Park, Thạch Thất District, Hanoi.

In 2020 the company presented a Vietnam-only VND600,000 (US$26) smartphone, the VSmart Bee Lite, subsidized in cooperation with Viettel. The phone is aimed at popularizing the brand and smartphones in general with the Vietnamese public.

At the Tech Awards 2020 competition in Vietnam, VinSmart has won many important awards.

- Vsmart won the Best Vietnamese Phone Brand award
- Vsmart Aris Pro won the phone award for leading the Vietnamese technology trend; Product Innovation Award
- Vsmart Live 4 won the best feature phone award

On 9 May 2021, VinSmart decided to stop manufacturing smartphones, marking the end of the 3-year journey of the Vietnamese company in making smartphones. According to Nguyen Viet Quang, vice president and CEO of Vingroup, he said that "smartphones or smart TVs no longer brings breakthroughs and creates unique values for users".

== Leaders ==
- Mai Hoa Tran: CEO

== Products ==
=== Smartphones ===
VSmart Live

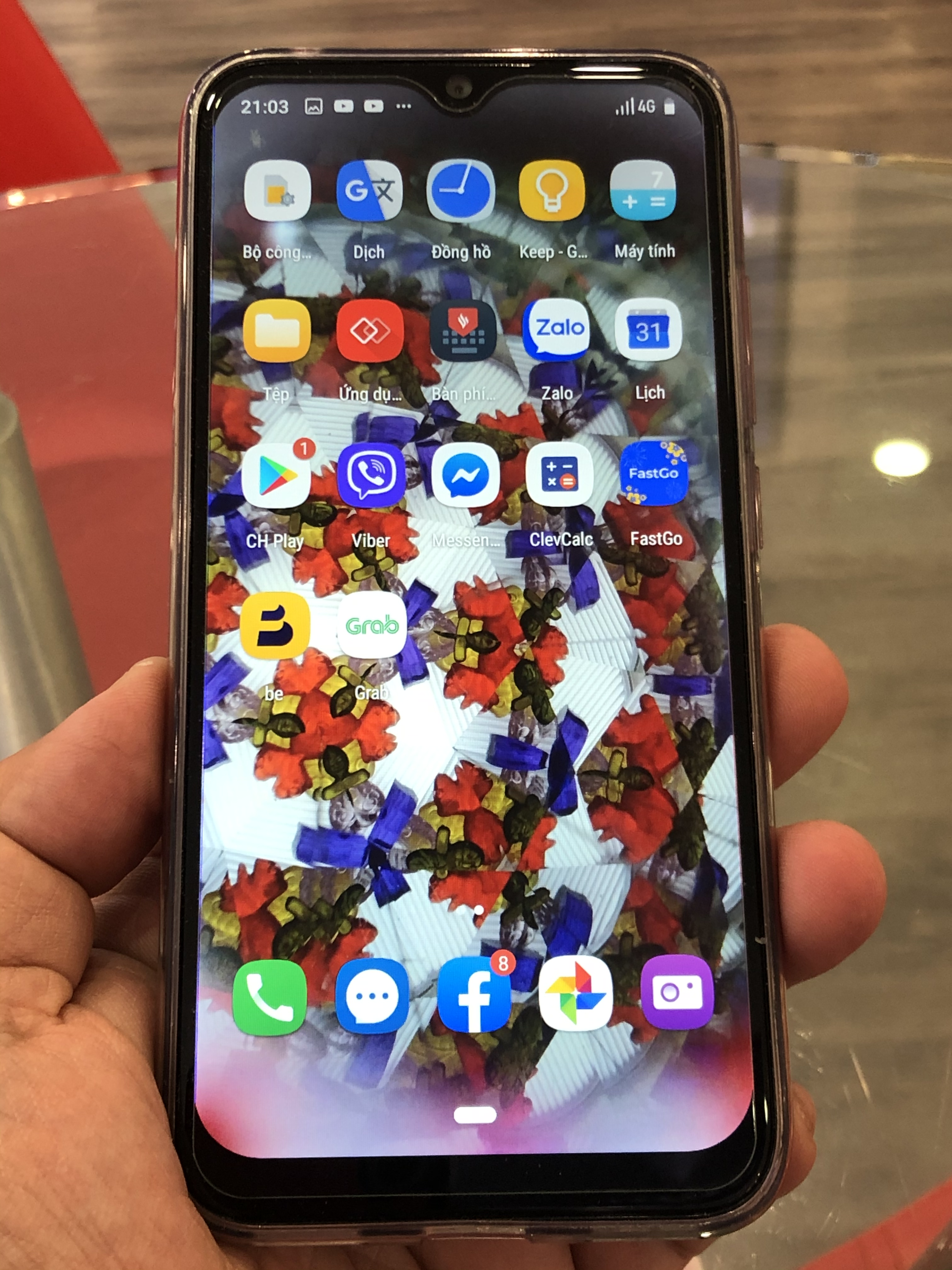
VSmart Joy 2+

- VSmart Active 1
- VSmart Active 1+
- VSmart Active 3
- Vsmart Bee
- Vsmart Bee 3
- VSmart Joy 1
- VSmart Joy 1+
- VSmart Joy 2+
- VSmart Joy 3
- VSmart Joy 4
- Vsmart Live
- Vsmart Star
- Vsmart Star 3
- Vsmart Star 4
- VSmart Live 4
- Vsmart Aris
- Vsmart Aris Pro. Vsmart Aris 5G will be released in US

=== Smart TVs ===
- 55KE8500 55” 4K HDR10
- 49KE8100 49" 4K HDR10
- 55KD6800 55" 4K HDR10
- 50KD6800 50" 4K HDR10
- 43KD6600 43" 4K HDR10

== See also ==
- Archos
- BQ (company)
- Qualcomm
- Fujitsu
- MediaMarkt
- The Strong Source Holdings Company
- ZTE
