= Ubuntu Edge =

Proposed smartphone

- Preview of Ubuntu Touch on a Ubuntu Edge (render)
- Brand: Canonical Ltd.
- Type: Smartphone
- Form factor: Touchscreen
- Dimensions: 124 mm (4.9 in) H 64 mm (2.5 in) W 9 mm (0.35 in) D
- Operating system: Ubuntu Touch and Android (Dual boot)
- Memory: 4 GB
- Storage: 128 GB
- Battery: rechargeable silicon-anode Li-ion
- Rear camera: 8 MP optimized for low light photography
- Front camera: 2 MP
- Display: 4.5 in (110 mm) diagonal 1280×720px (326 ppi); 16:9 aspect-ratio
- Connectivity: 3.5 mm TRRS; Dual-LTE; GSM; GPS; MHL; Bluetooth 4 NFC; Wi-Fi 802.11a/b/g/n
- Data inputs: Touchscreen; Accelerometer; Gyroscope; GPS; Barometer; Digital compass Proximity sensor Dual microphones for active noise cancellation
- Other: Sapphire crystal display screen, stereo speakers

The Ubuntu Edge was a proposed high-concept smartphone announced by Canonical Ltd. on 22 July 2013. Canonical was seeking to crowdfund a production run of around 40,000 units through Indiegogo. It had the highest target of any crowdfunded project to date, $32,000,000 over a one-month campaign. The Edge was not intended to go into mass production after the initial run, but rather to serve as a demonstration for new technologies for the industry. The Edge fell short of its funding goal, raising only $12,733,521 with 27,633 backers to purchase the standard model of the handset.

The Edge was designed as a hybrid device, which would function as a high-end smartphone (with both Ubuntu Touch and Android), or—when used with a monitor, keyboard and mouse—be able to operate as a conventional desktop PC running Ubuntu. The Ubuntu Edge was also designed to support dual boot, and was to run along with Android.

== Fundraising campaign ==
Reaction to Canonical's announcement was mixed; while it raised over a million dollars in the first five hours, one commentator has noted the unclear market for the device, with a large number of smartphone operating systems already available, and no precedent showing demand for a "single device" combining the phone with the user's primary computer. The first devices were offered for $600 against a main cost of $825; following the initial launch, this was revised to offer $625, $675 and $725 tranches as earlier ones were filled. Further revisions to the pricing came on 8 August, making it a flat $695 per unit. The first major company to make a pledge was Bloomberg LP, which pledged $80,000.

On 14 August, with 8 days until the deadline, the campaign passed the $10 million milestone. This milestone put the Ubuntu Edge as the second highest funded crowdfunding project at the time, behind Star Citizen, a space trading and combat simulation video game which had raised $15 million that year.

The campaign ended on 21 August with a final sum of $12,809,906, but was not able to meet its goal of $32 million to start the project.

== Technical details ==
Ubuntu Edge was a proposed smartphone with high-end specifications, often called a "superphone". Edge would have been powered by a multi-core processor and at least 4GB of RAM. The internal storage would have been 128GB. A micro-SIM slot would have been available. An 8 MP rear camera and 2 MP front-facing camera would also be available. The screen would have been a 4.5" sapphire crystal display (claimed to be scratchable only by diamond) with 1280 x 720 HD resolution. On the connectivity side Edge would have included Dual-LTE, dual-band 802.11n Wi-Fi, Bluetooth 4 and NFC. GPS, accelerometer, gyroscope, proximity sensor, compass, barometer etc. would be included from the input side. It would have had Stereo speakers with HD audio and allowed use of a dual microphone recording system with active noise cancellation. Edge would have had an 11-pin connector providing simultaneous MHL and USB OTG. A 3.5mm jack would have been included and a silicon-anode Li-ion battery would power the device.

The software would have booted Ubuntu Touch along with Android. The Android part would have also shipped the Ubuntu for Android technology, and according to the campaign Ubuntu Edge would have been the first phone to dual-boot between different operating systems out of the box, it would also have been able to be used as a fully integrated Ubuntu desktop PC when docked with a monitor. In physical dimensions, the device would measure at 64 × 9 x 124 mm.

== See also ==
Samsung DeX, a docking system
