= Glowforge =

Laser cutting machine

Glowforge is a laser cutting machine that uses a laser the width of a human hair to cut, engrave, and shape designs from a variety of materials; usually wood, leather, or acrylic.

== History ==
Dan Shapiro decided to crowdfund his project for a laser cutting machine, Glowforge, using its own crowdfunding platform based on WordPress, Elevato and other plug-ins because the company wanted to have direct communication with the community.

The campaign started On September 24, 2015 in which supporters were able to make pre-orders, they raised $22 million in Series B rounding fund from Foundry Group and True Ventures, in 30 days they received pre-orders of 27.9 million dollars.

The campaign ended on October 24, 2015, the funding raised $27.9 million.

== Models ==
Glowforge is sold in 6 models:

- Spark: It is the economic model uses normal speed and diode laser.
- Aura
- Plus
- Plus HD
- Pro: It is 12 times faster and uses CO_{2} laser.
- Pro HD

== See also ==
- Growth capital
- Laser
- Laser cutting
- List of highest-funded crowdfunding projects
- Venture capital
- Venture round
