= Chronicles of Elyria =

- Developer: Soulbound Studios
- Director: Jeromy Walsh
- Designer: Jeromy Walsh
- Engine: Unity
- Platform: Microsoft Windows
- Release: Cancelled
- Genre: Massively multiplayer online role-playing game
- Mode: Multiplayer

Chronicles of Elyria was a planned massively multiplayer online role-playing game for Microsoft Windows that was in development by Soulbound Studios between 2016 and 2026. Production started after an initially successful crowdfunding campaign on Kickstarter that raised $1.3 million. The studio subsequently raised an additional $7.7m via their website. The game was originally marked for an estimated December 2017 release, but this target was not met and nor have any subsequent timelines. In 2020 the studio announced that it would close, and laid-off all of its staff. Despite the closure announcement, development was claimed to be continuing on a pro bono basis under the Soulbound label. A class action lawsuit was subsequently filed by some backers of the project against Soulbound, which was subsequently dismissed. In October 2026, Soulbound Studios was closed.

== Development ==
Chronicles of Elyria had a Kickstarter campaign from May 3 to June 3, 2016 raising $1.36 million, surpassing their goal of $900,000.

Subsequent to the Kickstarter fundraising multiple webstore special events were conducted, such as the Settlers Of Elyria, and Searing Plague events. By October 2019, the company had raised over $7.7M.

Initial development saw various iterations and milestones declared as completed against a backdrop of needing to refactor the mechanics of alpha versions of the game (e.g. VoxElyria, Prelyria). A major setback in development was the dropping of SpatialOS as their backend networking/game hosting software.

=== Layoffs and studio closure ===
After being delayed from its tentative December 2019 date, a special virtual land auction event called "Settlers of Elyria" was launched on March 12, 2020. On March 20, Soulbound Studios released a pre-alpha, gray box demo showcasing parkour mechanics. Four days later, Soulbound Studios announced the closure of the studio, complete staff layoffs and the indefinite hiatus of the project. On April 9, Walsh released a new statement, claiming that his announcement was misinterpreted and that he would be pursuing continuing the project by having former staff members continue their work on a pro bono basis, while he would seek new sources of funding. On June 26, Walsh released a post on the official site announcing that the transaction logs of users were available, but were subsequently disabled when then the site was locked. He also stated that a new series of content would be posted on the site (and other media) "in the coming weeks".

On December 17, 2020, Soulbound Studios released a video titled "Inside Chronicles of Elyria - Episode 1" that featured Walsh explaining the state and future of the game and company. The video claimed that an independent auditor verified that the revenue backers gave to the company was "properly spent on game development". It also claimed that much of the content developed during the four years of development was not at a point for public consumption, but that many back end features had progressed. Additionally, Walsh announced that the game was continuing active development. On October 19, 2026, six years following the layoffs, Walsh announced that he would be closing Soulbound Studios and seeking new career opportunities.

=== Class action lawsuit ===
Following the announcement of Soulbound Studios' closure, days after a land auction, hundreds of backers of Chronicles of Elyria began to organize and explore legal avenues to take against Soulbound Studios and Walsh. Within days, the office of the attorney general of Washington had received hundreds of filed complaints – among the highest in the state's history. In April 2020 a class action lawsuit was filed in the Central District Court of California, seeking damages for alleged breach of contract, violation of the Consumers Legal Remedies Act, and unfair competition after an announcement was made that Soulbound Studios was closing, all staff had been laid off, and development on the game had ceased due to lack of funds. The plaintiffs filed a similar lawsuit against Xsolla, accusing the company of violating the terms of service that the backers who had purchased through their service agreed to, by refusing to refund them.

The lawsuit filed against Xsolla in California was deferred on September 7, 2021, with the ruling being that it would need to be re-filed in the Western District of Washington. The lawsuit against Soulbound Studios was dismissed in October 2022.
