= BQ Aquaris E4.5 =

Russian Android smartphone

- BQ Aquaris E4.5.
- Manufacturer: BQ
- Type: Touchscreen smartphone
- Series: BQ Aquaris series
- First released: Android Edition 1 June 2014; Ubuntu Edition 11 February 2015
- Successor: BQ Aquaris E5
- Form factor: Slate
- Dimensions: 137 mm (5.4 in) H; 67 mm (2.6 in) W; 9 mm (0.35 in) D
- Weight: 123 g (4.3 oz)
- Operating system: Android, Ubuntu Touch
- System-on-chip: MediaTek MT6582
- CPU: Quad-core Cortex A7 up to 1.3 GHz MediaTek
- GPU: Mali 400 up to 500 MHz
- Memory: 1 GB
- Storage: 8 GB
- Battery: 2,150 mAh
- Rear camera: 8 megapixel f/2.4, focus range 0.1 m~infinity, lens number 4P, lens size 1/3.2", dual flash and autofocus
- Front camera: 5 megapixel
- Display: 4.5 in (110 mm) 960x540 pixel (240 Pixels per inch)
- Model: 03BQAQU20; 03BQAQU30
- Codename: Krillin
- Website: www.bq.com/gb/aquaris-e-4-5

The BQ Aquaris E4.5 is an Android smartphone from the Spanish manufacturer BQ that was released to market in June 2014 as a budget dual-SIM phone. The device shipped with Android versions starting from v4.0 and can be updated to Android 4.4.2 (KitKat). BQ elected not to skin the operating system and as such it retains the unmodified "Google Experience".

== Ubuntu Edition ==
The Aquaris E4.5 is notable for being the first commercially available phone to carry the Ubuntu Touch mobile operating system.

On 9 February 2015, BQ in partnership with Canonical launched the BQ Aquaris E4.5 Ubuntu Edition and it began a gradual release in the European Union through a series of online flash sales.

BQ would later follow a similar pattern with the Aquaris E5, releasing it first with Android and then with Ubuntu Touch.

== See also ==
- BQ Aquaris E5

Preceded by BQ Aquaris E4	BQ Aquaris E4.5; 2014	Succeeded by BQ Aquaris E5
