= BQ Aquaris E5 =

Android smartphone

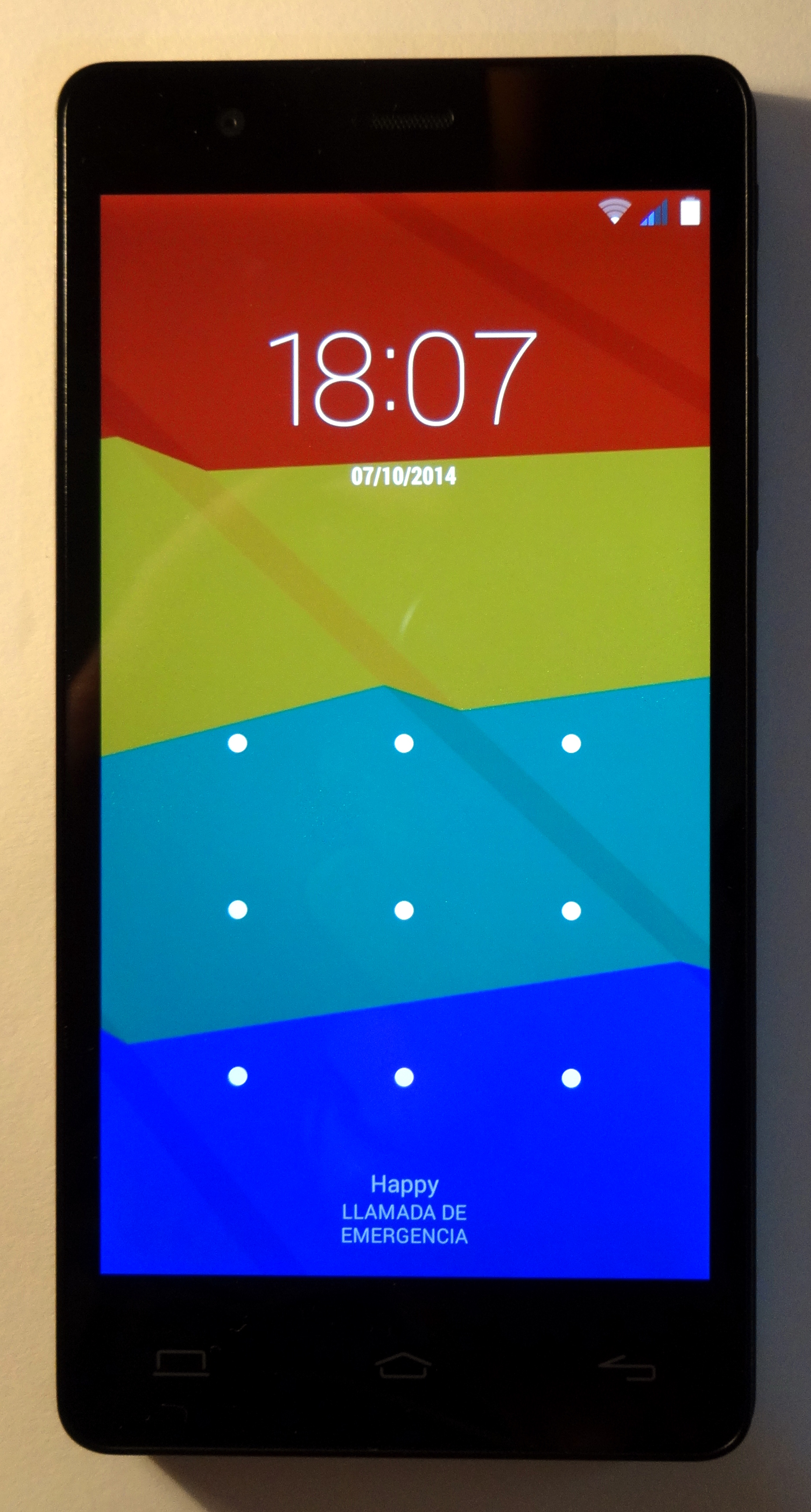
- BQ Aquaris E5
- Manufacturer: BQ
- Type: Smartphone
- Series: BQ Aquaris series
- First released: E5 & E5 FHD 1 July 2014; 12 years ago E5 HD Ubuntu Edition 10 June 2015; 11 years ago
- Predecessor: BQ Aquaris E4.5
- Form factor: Slate
- Dimensions: 142 mm (5.6 in) H; 71 mm (2.8 in) W; 8.65 mm (0.341 in) D
- Weight: 134 g (4.7 oz)
- Operating system: Android, Ubuntu Touch
- CPU: E5 : Quad-core Cortex A7 up to 1.3Ghz MediaTek MT6582; E5 FHD : MediaTek MT6592 2.0 GHz True8Core
- GPU: Mali 400-MP2 up to 500 MHz
- Memory: E5 : 1GB; E5 FHD : 2GB
- Storage: 16 GB
- Removable storage: MicroSD slot, up to 32 GB
- Battery: 2,500 mAh
- Rear camera: 13 megapixel f/2.2, focus range 0.1m~infinity, lens number 5P, lens size 1/3.2", dual flash and autofocus
- Front camera: 5 megapixel f/2.4
- Display: E5 : 5.0 in (130 mm) 1280x720 pixel (294 Pixels per inch); E5 FHD : 5.0 in (130 mm) 1920x1080 pixel (440 Pixels per inch)
- Model: E5; E5 FHD
- Website: www.bq.com/gb/aquaris-e5

The Aquaris E5 and Aquaris E5 FHD are dual-SIM Android smartphones from the Spanish manufacturer BQ that were released to market in July 2014. The devices shipped with Android 4.4 (KitKat). BQ elected not to skin the operating system and as such it retains the unmodified "Google Experience", such as found on the Google Nexus.

On 9 June 2015 BQ in partnership with Canonical launched the Aquaris E5 HD Ubuntu Edition. The phone is based on the Aquaris E5 hardware (with the 1280×720 screen) and was sold in the European Union only.

Notably, this is only the third phone to be sold with the Ubuntu Touch mobile operating system, after the BQ Aquaris E4.5 and the Meizu MX4 Ubuntu Edition.

== See also ==
- BQ Aquaris E4.5

Preceded by BQ Aquaris E4.5	BQ Aquaris E5; 2014	Succeeded by BQ Aquaris E6
