= Bluetti =

Chinese solar energy company

- Industry: Consumer technology
- Founded: 2009; 17 years ago
- Area served: North America, Europe, Asia Pacific, Latin America, Middle East, Africa
- Products: Portable Power Stations, solar panels, Home energy storage
- Parent: Shenzhen Kayo Maxtar Battery Co. (founded in 1999); Shenzhen PowerOak Newener Co., Ltd.; Bluetti; Poweroak; Maxoak
- Website: www.bluettipower.com

Bluetti (stylized in all caps) is a green energy company founded in 2009 in Shenzhen, China, specializing in portable power stations, solar generators, and energy storage systems.

== History ==
Bluetti was established in 2009 in Shenzhen, China. The company designs and manufactures portable power stations, home energy systems, solar panels, and related accessories for off-grid living and household energy backup.

In 2021, Bluetti launched the Lighting An African Family (LAAF) project, aimed at addressing electricity shortages in Africa. For every selected product sold, the company donates a solar power kit to provide lighting for households and communities in need.

As of 2024, Bluetti operates subsidiaries in the United States, the United Kingdom, Japan, and Germany.

== Products ==
Bluetti's products focus on portable and residential energy, including portable power stations designed for outdoor activities, emergency use, and backup power. Key models include the AC200, AC300, AC500, Elite 200 V2, along with expandable battery modules and accessories.

In 2022, Bluetti's AC500 and B300S were crowdfunded on Indiegogo. In 2023, the company introduced the SwapSolar System, integrating a modular power station battery with a portable refrigerator.
