= Sony Xperia XA2 Ultra =

2018 Sony smartphone

- Brand: Sony
- Manufacturer: Sony
- Type: Smartphone
- Series: Sony Xperia
- Family: Sony Xperia XA series
- First released: February 2018
- Related: Sony Xperia XA2; Sony Xperia XA2 Plus
- Compatible networks: GSM 850/1900 MHz; WCDMA 900/2100; LTE, EDGE, GPRS
- Form factor: Slate
- Colors: Silver, Black, Blue, Gold
- Dimensions: 163 mm H 80 mm W 9.5 mm D
- Weight: 221 g (8 oz)
- Operating system: Android 8.0 "Oreo"
- System-on-chip: Qualcomm Snapdragon 630
- CPU: 2.2 GHz octa-core Qualcomm Snapdragon 630
- GPU: Adreno 508
- Memory: 4 GB RAM
- Storage: 32 GB or 64 GB
- Removable storage: microSD (up to 256 GB)
- Battery: 3580 mAh Li-ion (non-removable)
- Rear camera: Single-Camera Setup; Sony Exmor RS IMX 300; 23 MP, f/2.0, 24mm (wide), 1/2.3", PDAF; Features: LED flash, HDR, panorama; Video: 4K@30fps, 1080p@30fps, stereo sound rec., HDR
- Front camera: Dual-Camera Setup; Primary: Sony Exmor RS IMX 234; 16 MP, f/2.0, 23mm, FoV 88°, 1/2.6", 1.12μm, OIS, AF; Ultrawide: Sony Exmor R IMX 219; 8 MP, f/2.4, 11mm, FoV 120°, 1/4.0", 1.12μm; Video: 1080p@30fps
- Display: 6" 1920 x 1080 pixels LCD capacitive
- Media: Music, Xperia Album
- Connectivity: Wi-Fi 802.11 a/b/g/n, Wi-Fi Direct, hotspot, Bluetooth 5.0, A2DP, aptX HD, LE, NFC, GPS + GLONASS, USB-C 2.0, USB Host, FM radio
- Data inputs: Multi-touch touchscreen
- Development status: Discontinued
- Other: Dual SIM card, accelerometer, digital compass, proximity sensor, light sensor, fingerprint sensor
- Website: Official Website

The Sony Xperia XA2 Ultra is a smartphone from the Sony Xperia series and branded by Sony. It was announced in January 2018 at the CES 2018 along with two other devices from the same line: the Sony Xperia XA2 and Sony Xperia L2. It went available in the United States on February 16, 2018 for online availability with Amazon and Best Buy.

== Specifications ==
=== Design & build ===
Despite a significant increase in the smartphone's size, the appearance of the Sony Xperia XA2 Ultra remains consistent with Sony's signature style—a rectangular body with sharp corners. The top and bottom bezels remain quite large, while the side bezels are almost non-existent.

The phone's plastic back cover has a matte surface, the front is entirely covered with Gorilla Glass 4, and the sides are made of metal.

Minor changes occurred in the design of the Sony Xperia XA2 Ultra: the fingerprint scanner was moved to the back panel, and the power button returned to the circular shape found in older models.

The dimensions of the smartphone are 163 x 80 x 9.5 mm, and it weighs 221 grams.

This model was released in four colors: blue, black, silver, and gold.

=== Hardware ===
The smartphone is powered by an 8-core Qualcomm Snapdragon 630 processor with a clock speed of 2.2 GHz (ARMv7 architecture) and an Adreno 508 GPU.

It includes 4 GB of RAM and built-in storage of either 32 GB or 64 GB, with a dedicated slot for a memory card up to 256 GB.

The phone's screen has a 6-inch diagonal and a resolution of 1920 x 1080 (Full HD), with a pixel density of 367 ppi and a 16:9 aspect ratio with a wide range of brightness adjustments.

The main camera is 23 megapixels (f/2.0) and features an LED flash, autofocus, and panorama mode. It records video in 2160p at 30 frames per second with stereo sound. The dual front camera with flash consists of 16 and 8 megapixel sensors, recording video at 1080p, 30 frames per second.

Data is transmitted via wireless modules such as Wi-Fi (802.11 a/b/g/n, Wi-Fi Direct, hotspot), Bluetooth 5.0, A2DP, aptX HD, LE, and NFC. It has a built-in antenna for GPS and GLONASS. The phone also features USB Type-C and an FM radio.

The entire device is powered by a non-removable 3580 mAh Lithium-ion battery with fast charging support.

=== Software ===
The Sony Xperia XA2 Ultra smartphone ships with Android 8.0 Oreo and Sony's proprietary UI skin.
