= Sony Xperia Ace II =

Android smartphone

- Brand: Sony
- Manufacturer: Sony Mobile
- Type: Smartphone
- Series: Xperia
- First released: Japan May 19, 2021; 5 years ago
- Availability by region: Japan May 28, 2021
- Predecessor: Sony Xperia Ace
- Successor: Sony Xperia Ace III
- Compatible networks: GSM, 3G, 4G (LTE)
- Form factor: Slate
- Dimensions: 140 mm H 69 mm W 8.9 mm D
- Weight: 159 g (6 oz)
- Operating system: Initial: Android 11
- CPU: MediaTek Helio P35 (Cortex-A53 8×2.3 GHz) 8 cores
- GPU: IMG PowerVR GE8320
- Memory: 4 GB
- Storage: 64 GB
- Removable storage: microSDXC (up to 1 TB)
- Battery: Non-removable, Li-Po 4500 mAh
- Charging: Qualcomm Quick Charge 3.0
- Rear camera: 12 MP main + 2 MP depth sensor
- Front camera: 8 MP, f/2.0 Video: 1080p@30fps
- Display: IPS TFT 5.5 in, 1496 × 720, (720p), 302 ppi
- Connectivity: Wi-Fi 802.11 a/b/g/n/ac (2.4/5 GHz); Bluetooth 5.0; USB-C; GPS with A-GPS; Mobile FeliCa/Osaifu-Keitai; GLONASS
- Data inputs: Multi-touch touchscreen
- Model: SO-41B

The Sony Xperia Ace II is an entry-level Android smartphone manufactured and marketed by Sony. It is part of the Xperia series, but unlike its predecessor, the Sony Xperia Ace, the smartphone shifted from the lower-mid-range class to the budget segment. It was introduced on May 19, 2021, for the Japanese carrier NTT DoCoMo, similar to its predecessor. Although no other regional versions were released, it can be carrier-unlocked. The phone serves as the compact entry in the 2021 lineup.

== Specifications ==
=== Design & build ===
The Xperia Ace II is constructed with an entirely matte plastic body. The form factor is similar to Apple iPhone 12 mini. The front-facing camera is housed in the top panel within a "waterdrop" notch, unlike other 2021 Sony smartphones; the last Sony smartphone to feature such a cutout was the Sony Xperia L4.

The SIM card and microSD tray is located on the left side of the device under a cap, which allows it to be opened without additional tools like an ejector pin. The power button/fingerprint sensor, a dedicated Google Assistant button, and the volume rocker are located on the right side of the device, while a 3.5 mm headphone jack along with a microphone sit at the top.

The rear cameras are arranged in the upper left corner of the phone, with an LED flash directly above them.

The bottom edge houses the primary microphone, loudspeaker, and a USB-C port. The display is protected by Corning Gorilla Glass 6.

The phone has an IP65/IP68 rating for dust and water resistance, which was a rare feature for a budget smartphone in 2021.

=== Hardware & software ===
The device is powered by a MediaTek Helio P35 processor and an IMG PowerVR GE8320 GPU. It comes equipped with 4 GB of RAM and 64 GB of internal storage. Storage expansion via a microSD card is supported up to 1 TB using a single SIM slot. The display uses the same type of IPS TFT panel as the original Ace, but increased in size to 5.5 inches while reducing the resolution to 1496 × 720 (720p), resulting in a reduced pixel density of 302 ppi. The Ace II features a 4500 mAh battery—retaining nearly the same body footprint as its predecessor—which can be charged via the USB-C port. On the back, it features a dual-camera system consisting of a 12 MP main sensor and a 2 MP secondary sensor for depth-of-field effects. The front camera is equipped with an 8 MP sensor with an aperture of f/2.0. The mobile device runs on Andorid 11 with the pre-installed Google Play out-of-the-box.

Preceded by Sony Xperia Ace	Sony Xperia Ace II; 2021	Succeeded by Sony Xperia Ace III
