= Sony Xperia XA1 Ultra =

- Brand: Sony
- Developer: Sony Mobile Communications
- Manufacturer: Sony
- Type: Smartphone
- Series: Sony Xperia
- First released: May 22, 2017; 9 years ago
- Predecessor: Sony Xperia XA Ultra
- Compatible networks: GSM GPRS/EDGE (2G), UMTS HSPA (3G), LTE (4G)
- Form factor: Slate
- Colors: White, Black, Gold, Pink
- Dimensions: 165 mm (6.5 in) H 79 mm (3.1 in) W 8.1 mm (0.32 in) D
- Weight: 188 g (6.6 oz)
- Operating system: Android 7.0 "Nougat", upgradable to Android 8.0 "Oreo"
- System-on-chip: MediaTek MT6757 Helio P20
- Memory: 4 GB RAM
- Storage: 32 GB
- Removable storage: microSDHC, expandable up to 256 GB
- SIM: nano-SIM (single or dual-SIM)
- Battery: 2700 mAh Li-ion
- Charging: Pump Express fast charging
- Rear camera: 23 MP, autofocus, LED flash, Full HD video
- Front camera: 16 MP, LED flash, HD video
- Display: 6.0 in (150 mm), 1080 × 1920 pixels IPS LCD

The Sony Xperia XA1 Ultra (models G3212, G3221, G3223, G3226) is a mid-range Android smartphone (phablet) developed by Sony Mobile Communications. It was announced on 27 February 2017 at the Mobile World Congress. The device focuses on selfie photography and was released globally on 22 May 2017.

The phone is the successor to the Sony Xperia XA Ultra and is the largest device in the Xperia XA1 series, which also includes the Sony Xperia XA1 and Sony Xperia XA1 Plus. Its internal codename is Redwood.

== Hardware ==
The device is largely similar to the Sony Xperia XA1, differing mainly in its larger size, higher-capacity battery, and a front camera equipped with an LED flash for selfies. The phone features an aluminium frame at the top and bottom, while the sides and rear panel are made of plastic.

The display extends close to the edges of the device with slightly curved sides, giving it a tall appearance, although relatively large bezels remain at the top and bottom. The upper section contains the earpiece, proximity sensor, a 16-megapixel front camera with LED flash, and a notification LED. The lower section houses the microphone and loudspeaker.

A microSDHC card (supporting up to 256 GB) and the nano-SIM card are inserted from the side beneath a protective cover. The power button and volume controls, maintaining Sony's traditional design style, are also located on the side of the device.

On the rear panel there is a 23-megapixel Exmor RS camera with flash. The bottom of the phone features a USB Type-C connector. The device ships with a cable and a 1.5-amp charging adapter and supports Pump Express fast-charging technology.

The smartphone is powered by an octa-core MediaTek MT6757 Helio P20 processor (four cores at 2.3 GHz and four cores at 1.6 GHz) paired with 4 GB of RAM. Internal storage capacity is 32 GB. The phone was produced in white, black, gold, and pink colour variants.

The display is a 6-inch IPS LCD panel with a resolution of 1080 × 1920 pixels. Dual-SIM variants were also released. An NFC chip is located on the rear of the device, although the phone does not include a fingerprint reader. The battery has a capacity of 2700 mAh.

== Software ==
The device originally shipped with Android 7.0 (Nougat). Sony kept the default Android interface largely unchanged, although the Xperia Home interface provides a visually enhanced launcher.

Android 7.0 introduced multi-window mode, which is supported by the device. Several Sony applications are preinstalled, including What's New, which functions as Sony's application store and update hub.

Other preinstalled applications include News Suite, PlayStation Network, Sketch, TrackID, Spotify, Album, Music and Video apps, Xperia Care, Smart Connect, Movie Creator, Xperia Lounge, AVG for Xperia, and Amazon Shopping. Most standard Google applications are also included.

For text input, Sony replaced the earlier Xperia Keyboard with the SwiftKey keyboard. Content from a previous device can be transferred using the Xperia Transfer Mobile application.

Battery life can be extended using Sony's STAMINA and Ultra STAMINA power-saving modes.

The device received an update to Android 8.0 (Oreo) in early 2018.
