= Sony Xperia R1 =

2017 Sony Smartphone

- Brand: Sony
- Manufacturer
- Type: Smartphone
- Series: Xperia
- First released: October 27, 2017; 8 years ago
- Availability by region: India: November 10, 2017; 8 years ago
- Predecessor: Sony Xperia XA
- Successor: Sony Xperia XA2
- Related: Sony Xperia XA1
- Compatible networks: GSM, 3G, 4G (LTE)
- Form factor: Monoblock
- Colors: Black, Silver
- Dimensions: 146 mm H 73.4 mm W 8.9 mm D
- Weight: 154 g (5 oz)
- Operating system: Initial: Android 7.1 Nougat; Current: Android 8.0 Oreo
- CPU: Qualcomm Snapdragon 430, MSM8937, 8 cores (8×1.5 GHz Cortex-A53)
- GPU: Adreno 505
- Memory: 2 GB; R1 Plus; 3 GB
- Storage: eMMC 5.1; 16 GB; R1 Plus; 32 GB
- Removable storage: microSDXC
- Battery: Non-removable, Li-Ion 2620 mAh
- Rear camera: 13 MP, predictive PDAF, LED flash Video: 1080p@30fps
- Front camera: 13 MP, 1/4", predictive PDAF, LED flash Video: 1080p@30fps
- Display: TFT LCD 5.2" (130 mm), 1280 x 720p, (720p), 16:9, 282 ppi External screen: absent
- Connectivity: Wi-Fi 802.11 b/g/n Bluetooth 4.2; A2DP aptX; GPS with A-GPS; GLONASS; USB-C; NFC
- Data inputs: Multitouch sensor

The Sony Xperia R1 is an Android-based smartphone that was sold and manufactured by Sony Mobile. Part of the mid-range Xperia series, it was introduced on October 27, 2017, along with the R1 Plus, exclusively for the Indian market. The difference between the R1 and R1 Plus is only in the amount of memory. Smartphones were available in black and silver colors on November 10.

== Design ==
The device body is entirely plastic, made in the Loop Surface concept characteristic of Sony. The top and bottom bezels remained quite large, while the side bezels are almost absent. The SIM-card and MicroSD tray is present on the left side of the device, in the form of a plug, which allows it to be opened without auxiliary things like a needle. The power button and volume rocker are located on the right side of the device, and a 3.5 mm audio jack for headphones along with a microphone are at the top. The rear camera is located in the upper left corner of the phone, and below the camera is an LED flash. The body is rounded along the side edges, while the top and bottom are sharp, on the contrary. Dimensions: width 73.4 mm, height 146 mm, thickness 8.9 mm, weight 154 grams.

== Technical specifications ==
=== Hardware ===
==== Processor ====
The Xperia R1 is equipped with a Qualcomm Snapdragon 430 processor and an Adreno 505 graphics processor.

==== Storage ====
The R1 is available with 2 GB of RAM and 16 GB of eMMC 5.1 internal memory; while the R1 Plus is available with 3 GB of RAM and 32 GB of eMMC 5.1 internal memory.

MicroSD card expansion is supported in both models up to 128 GB and, unlike other Sony smartphones, there is a separate slot, meaning it can be used with two SIM cards. Both phones are charged and transfer data via USB-C.

==== Display ====
The display is a 16:9 TFT LCD panel, 720p (720 × 1280), 5.2-inch (130 mm) screens respectively, with a pixel density of 282 ppi.

==== Battery ====
The phone's battery capacity is 2620 mAh.

==== Camera ====
On the rear panel there is a camera that has a 13 MP lens with PDAF and a front 8 MP.

=== Software ===
The Xperia R1 and Xperia R1 Plus were released with Android 7.1 "Nougat", but were updated to Android 8.0 "Oreo" on March 12, 2018.
