= Sony Xperia acro HD IS12S =

2012 smartphone model

Xperia acro HD IS12S
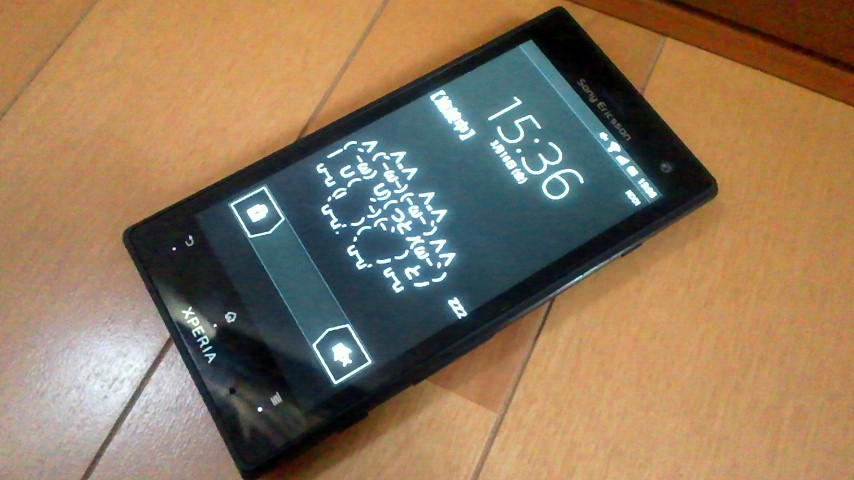
- Front view of the device
- Brand: au
- Manufacturer: Sony Mobile
- Series: Xperia
- First released: March 10, 2012; June 22, 2012 (Blue)
- Availability by region: Japan only Hokuriku / Chugoku / Shikoku / Kyushu / Okinawa: March 10, 2012; Hokkaido / Chubu: March 11, 2012; Tohoku / Kanto / Kansai: March 14, 2012
- Compatible networks: CDMA2000 1xMC (CDMA 1X WIN) (New 800 MHz/2 GHz)
- Form factor: Bar
- Colors: Blue; Rouge; Black; White
- Dimensions: 126 mm (5.0 in) H 66 mm (2.6 in) W 11.9 mm (0.47 in) D
- Weight: 149 g (5.3 oz)
- Operating system: Android 2.3.7, upgradable to 4.0.4
- System-on-chip: Qualcomm Snapdragon S3 MSM8660
- CPU: 1.5 GHz Dual-Core
- Memory: 1 GB RAM
- Storage: 16 GB ROM (Approx. 13 GB user available)
- Removable storage: microSD (up to 2 GB), microSDHC (up to 32 GB) (officially supported by KDDI)
- Battery: 1840 mAh non-removable battery
- Rear camera: Approx. 12.1 megapixels, back-illuminated CMOS, autofocus, HD video recording
- Front camera: Approx. 1.3 megapixels, CMOS
- Display: 4.3 in (110 mm) HD Reality Display, HD 1280 × 720 pixels (342 ppi), approx. 16.77 million colors
- Model: SOI12
- Made in: China

Xperia acro HD IS12S is a smartphone developed by Sony Mobile for the Japanese domestic market, distributed under the au brand by KDDI and Okinawa Cellular Telephone Company as part of their IS series. Its manufacturing model number is SOI12.

On March 8, 2012, Sony Ericsson Mobile Communications, Inc. officially changed its corporate name to Sony Mobile Communications Inc. Consequently, this model represents the final device developed under the Sony Ericsson name.

The Xperia acro HD IS12S was released on March 10 for Hokuriku, Chugoku, Shikoku, Kyushu, and Okinawa regions, followed by Hokkaido and Chubu regions by a day, and Tohoku, Kanto and Kansai regions. by 3 days.

== Specifications ==
=== Display ===
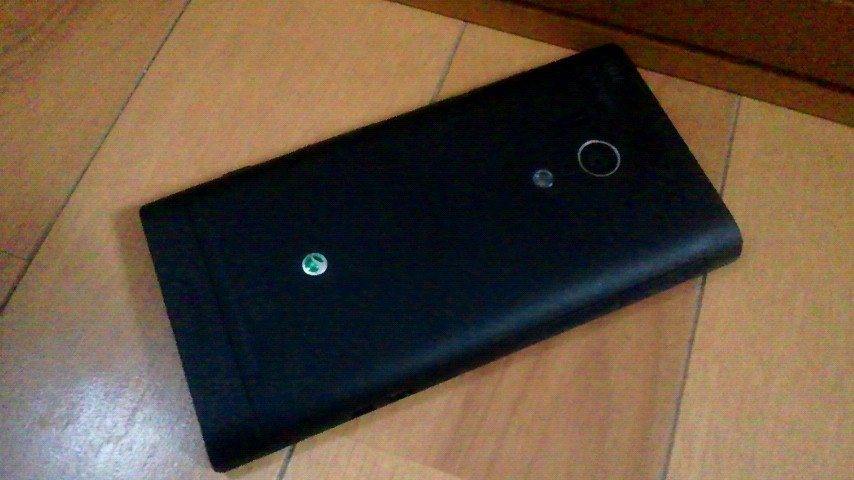
Rear panel view

The Xperia acro HD IS12S is a waterproof smartphone (IPX5/7-rated) featuring a 4.3-inch high-definition (1280 x 720 pixels) touchscreen. Its display incorporates Sony's high-brightness and high-contrast "HD Reality Display" technology, alongside a Mobile BRAVIA Engine designed to enhance image vibrancy.

=== Camera and hardware ===
The device is equipped with a 12.1-megapixel rear CMOS sensor that supports rapid startup, continuous burst shooting, and HD video capture.

Under the hood, the phone is powered by a 1.5 GHz dual-core Qualcomm MSM8660 processor and a 1840 mAh non-removable battery. Positioned for the Japanese market, it includes localized features such as 1Seg mobile television, mobile payment capabilities, infrared data transmission, and native carrier email integration. Additionally, it supports Japan's "Emergency Alert Mail" broadcast system, which delivers earthquake, tsunami, and civil evacuation warnings. The device operates on the WIN HIGH SPEED network protocol but lacks WiMAX support, though it maintains compatibility with GSM, GPRS, and UMTS networks for international roaming.
