= Sony Xperia L1 =

Smartphone model

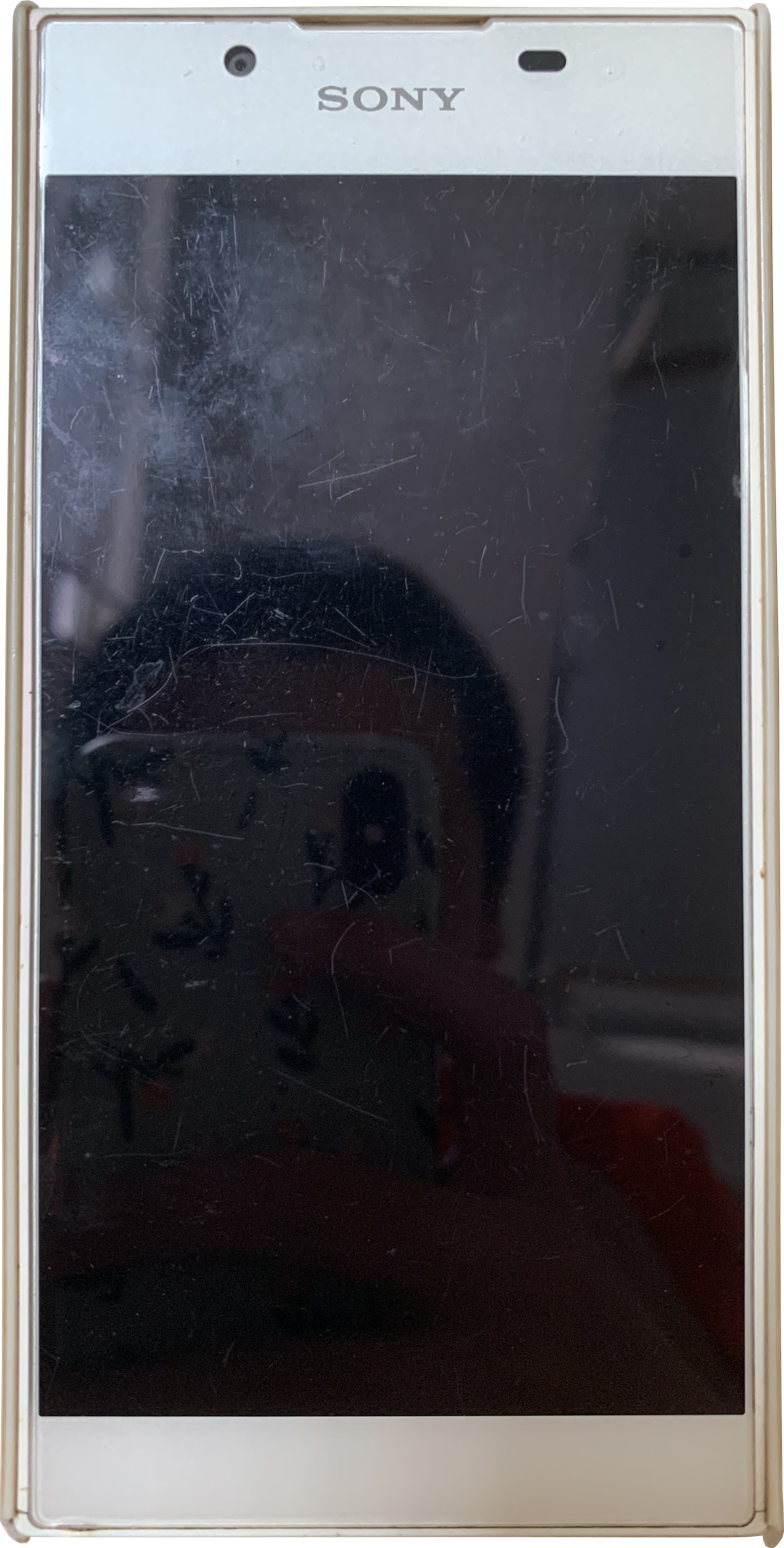
- Brand: Sony
- Manufacturer: Sony Mobile Communications
- Type: Touchscreen smartphone
- Series: Sony Xperia
- First released: June 2017
- Predecessor: Sony Xperia E5
- Successor: Sony Xperia L2
- Compatible networks: 2G 3G 4G LTE 4G+
- Colors: Black, White, Pink
- Operating system: Android 7.0 "Nougat"
- System-on-chip: MediaTek MT6737T
- CPU: Quad-core 64-bit
- GPU: Mali T720 MP2
- Memory: 2 GB RAM
- Storage: 16 GB
- Removable storage: Up to 256 GB microSDXC
- SIM: Dual Sim Is Only On G3312 ,G3313 (US Only) Nano Sim On G3311
- Battery: non-user removable Li-ion 2620 mAh
- Charging: Charging Up To 10W
- Rear camera: Single-Camera Setup; Samsung ISOCELL S5K3L8; 13 MP, f/2.2, 26mm (wide), 1/3.06", 1.12μm, AF; Features: LED flash, HDR; Video: 1080p@30fps
- Front camera: OmniVision OV5675; 5 MP, f/2.2, 24mm (wide), 1/5.0", 1.12μm; Video: 1080p@30fps
- Display: 5.5 in (140 mm) 720p IPS LCD; HD 1280 x 720 px
- Connectivity: Wi-Fi 802.11 a/b/g/n/ac (2.4/5GHz); Bluetooth 5.0; USB-C; NFC; GPS with Assisted GPS; GLONASS
- Data inputs: Multi-touch, capacitive touchscreen, proximity sensor
- Codename: G3311, G3312, G3313 (US ONLY)
- Other: Wifi Hotspot, USB tethering
- Website: Official website

The Sony Xperia L1 is an Android smartphone manufactured by Sony Mobile Communications. It was announced in March 2017 and was released in June 2017.

== Specifications ==
=== Hardware ===
The device features a 5.5-inch (14 cm) 720p screen.

The rear-facing camera of the Xperia L1 is 13 megapixels. The front-facing camera is 5 MP.

=== Software ===
The Xperia L1 is preinstalled with Android 7.0 Nougat with Sony's custom interface and software.

Preceded by Sony Xperia E5	Sony Xperia L1; 2017	Succeeded by Sony Xperia L2
