= Sony Xperia L3 =

Android smartphone

- Brand: Sony
- Manufacturer: Sony Mobile Communications
- Type: Smartphone
- Series: Sony Xperia
- First released: 19 February 2019
- Availability by region: Europe, Asia, Japan, United States
- Predecessor: Sony Xperia L2
- Successor: Sony Xperia L4
- Compatible networks: 2G; 3G; 4G LTE; 4G+
- Form factor: Slate
- Colors: Black, Gold, Silver
- Dimensions: 154 mm (6.1 in) H 72 mm (2.8 in) W 8.9 mm (0.35 in) D
- Weight: 156 g (5.5 oz)
- Operating system: Android 8.1 "Oreo"
- System-on-chip: MediaTek Helio P22
- CPU: Octa-core (2.0 GHz Cortex-A53)
- GPU: PowerVR GE8320
- Memory: 3 GB RAM
- Storage: eMMC 5.1; 32 GB
- Removable storage: microSD, expandable up to 512 GB
- SIM: Dual Sim, variates from country
- Battery: Non-removable 3300 mAh
- Charging: Charging up to 12W
- Rear camera: 13 MP, f/2.2, 26mm (wide), 1/3", 1.12 μm, PDAF; 2 MP (depth sensor)
- Front camera: 8 MP, f/2.0, 24mm (wide), 1/4", 1.0 μm, 1080p@30fps
- Display: 5.7 in (140 mm) 1080p (1440 x 1080) IPS LCD, ~282 pixel density, Gorilla Glass 5
- Sound: Loudspeaker, 3.5mm headphone jack
- Connectivity: Wi-Fi 802.11 a/b/g/n/ac (2.4/5GHz); Bluetooth 5.0; USB-C; NFC; GPS with Assisted GPS; GLONASS
- Data inputs: Sensors: Accelerometer; Barometer; Fingerprint scanner (side-mounted, always on); Gyroscope; Proximity sensor
- Water resistance: IP1 Splash Proof
- Model: I3112, I4312, I4332, I3322
- Other: Wifi Hotspot, USB tethering, Bluetooth tethering
- Website: Official website

The Sony Xperia L3 is an Android smartphone marketed and manufactured by Sony. Part of Sony's low-end Xperia series, it was unveiled at the annual Mobile World Congress event on February 25, 2019 alongside the Xperia 10, Xperia 10 Plus and Xperia 1.

== Design ==
The Xperia L3 has a polycarbonate unibody construction, with Corning Gorilla Glass 5 protecting the screen. The top bezel houses the earpiece, front-facing camera, notification LED and various sensors. The fingerprint sensor and power and volume buttons are located on the right side of the device, while the 3.5mm headphone jack is located on the top. The rear cameras are located at the upper left-hand corner of the phone, with the LED flash below. The bottom edge has the primary microphone and a downward-firing speaker next to the USB-C port. Three colors are available: Black, Gold and Silver.

== Specifications ==
=== Hardware ===
The device is powered by the MediaTek Helio P22 SoC and the PowerVR GE8320 GPU. It is available with 3 GB of RAM and 64 GB of eMMC storage. MicroSD card expansion is supported up to 512 GB with a single-SIM or hybrid dual-SIM setup. The display uses a 5.7-inch (145mm) 18:9 720p (1440 × 720) IPS LCD panel which results in a pixel density of 282 ppi. The L3 has a 3300mAh battery, the same capacity as its predecessor. Power and data connections are provided through the USB-C port. A dual camera setup is present on the rear, with a 13 MP primary lens with PDAF and a 2 MP depth sensor. The front-facing camera has an 8 MP sensor.

=== Software ===
The Xperia L3 runs on Android 8.1 "Oreo".

Preceded by Sony Xperia L2	Sony Xperia L3; 2019	Succeeded by Sony Xperia L4
