= Sony Xperia XA1 =

Smartphone model by Sony

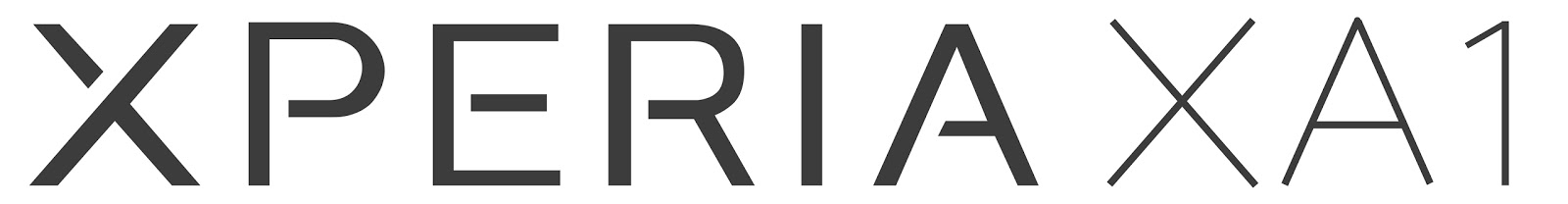

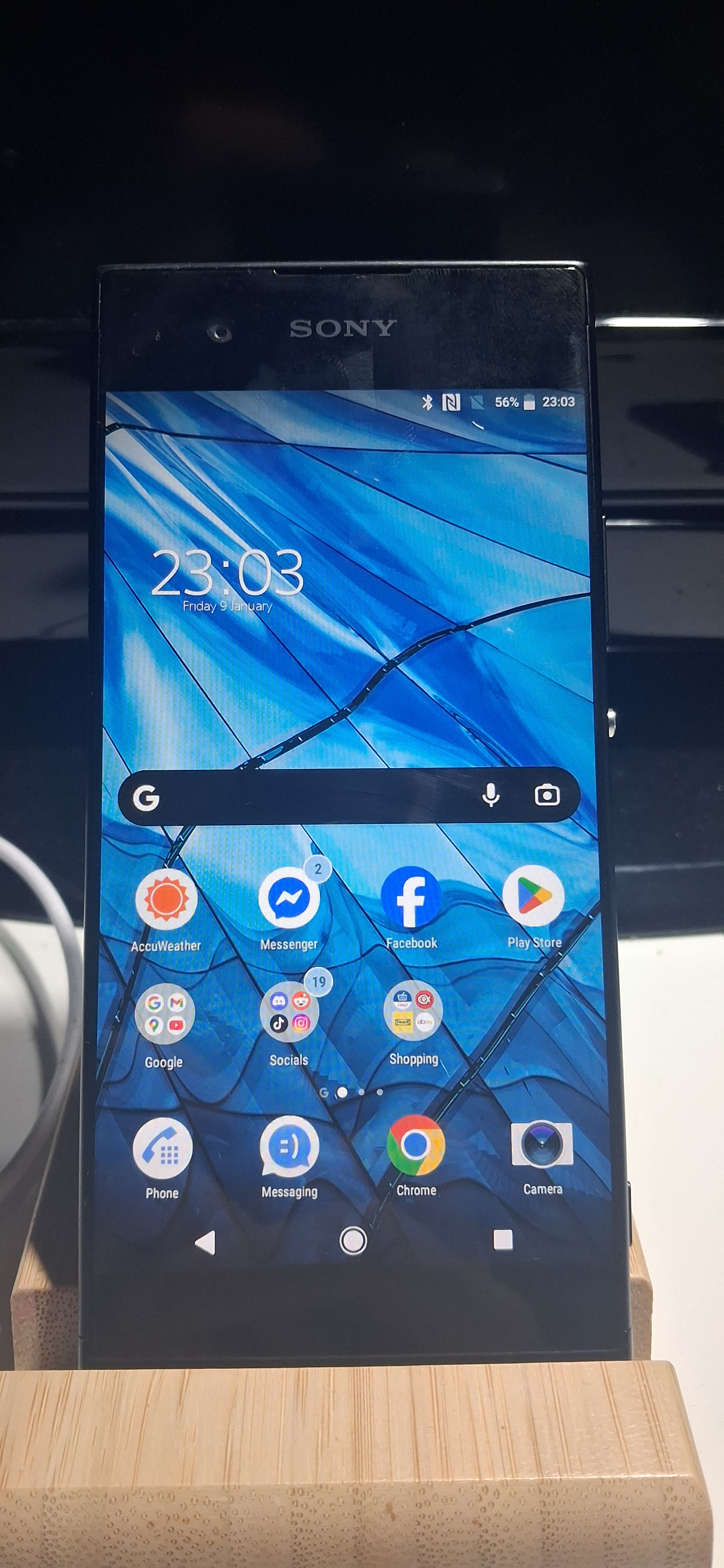
- Sony Xperia XA1 front view
- Brand: Sony
- Manufacturer: Sony Mobile Communications
- Type: Smartphone
- Series: Sony Xperia
- First released: 31 March 2017; 9 years ago (HK)
- Predecessor: Sony Xperia XA
- Successor: Sony Xperia XA2
- Related: Sony Xperia XA1 Ultra; Sony Xperia XA1 Plus
- Compatible networks: HSPA, GSM & LTE
- Form factor: Slate
- Dimensions: 145 mm (5.7 in) H 67 mm (2.6 in) W 8 mm (0.31 in) D
- Weight: 143 g (5.0 oz)
- Operating system: Android 7.0 "Nougat" (Upgradable to Android 8.0 "Oreo")
- System-on-chip: MediaTek MT6757 (Helio P20)
- CPU: Octa-core 64-bit (4x Cortex A53 2.3Ghz-4x Cortex A53 1.6Ghz)
- GPU: Mali T880 MP2
- Memory: 3 GB
- Storage: 32 GB
- Removable storage: Up to 256GB microSDXC
- SIM: Micro
- Battery: non-user removable Li-ion 2300 mAh
- Rear camera: 23 MP, 1/2.3'' memory-stacked IMX-300 image sensor Exmor RS for mobile (1.12μm); LED flash, Hybrid Autofocus, Quick Launch & Capture; 5x Clear Image Zoom; 24mm Wide Angle Lens, f/2.0 Full HD 1080p@30fps video recording, SteadyShot
- Front camera: 8 MP 1/4'' Exmor RS for mobile camera sensor 23mm Wide Angle Lens and f/2.0 aperture SteadyShot
- Display: 5.0 in (130 mm) 720p IPS LCD; HD (1280x720 px); Super-Vivid Mode; Image enhancement
- Connectivity: Wi-Fi; NFC; GPS/GLONASS; Bluetooth 4.2; USB 2.0 (Type-C port, USB charging, Quick Charge Pump Express Plus 2.0); 3.50 mm (0.138 in) headphone jack
- Data inputs: Multi-touch, capacitive touchscreen, proximity sensor
- Codename: Hinoki
- Website: Official Website
- References: www.gsmarena.com/sony_xperia_xa1-8596.php

The Sony Xperia XA1 is a smartphone produced by Sony. Part of the Xperia X Series, the device was unveiled alongside the Sony Xperia XZ Premium, Sony Xperia XZs and Sony Xperia XA1 Ultra at the annual Mobile World Congress in February 2017.

== Specifications ==
=== Hardware ===
It features a 23 megapixel rear camera, an 8 megapixel front-facing camera, headphone jack, 32 GB of on board storage (which can be expanded up to 256 GB via micro SD) and a 5.0 inch 720p display.

The Xperia XA1 SoC uses a MediaTek Helio P20 (MT6757) with only 3GB of RAM.

=== Software ===
It runs on Android 7.0 "Nougat" out of the box and it can be updated to Android 8.0 "Oreo" via software update by Sony.

Preceded by Sony Xperia XA	Sony Xperia XA1; 2017	Succeeded by Sony Xperia XA2
