= Sony Xperia L4 =

Android smartphone

- Brand: Sony
- Manufacturer: Sony Mobile Communications
- Type: Smartphone
- Series: Sony Xperia
- First released: 28 April 2020; 6 years ago
- Predecessor: Sony Xperia L3
- Successor: Sony Xperia Ace II (indirect)
- Related: Sony Xperia 10 II; Sony Xperia 1 II
- Compatible networks: 2G; 3G; 4G LTE
- Form factor: Slate
- Dimensions: 159 mm (6.3 in) H 71 mm (2.8 in) W 8.7 mm (0.34 in) D
- Weight: 178 g (6.3 oz)
- Operating system: Android 9 "Pie"
- System-on-chip: MediaTek Helio P22
- CPU: Octa-core (2.0 GHz Cortex-A53)
- GPU: PowerVR GE8320
- Memory: 3 GB RAM
- Storage: eMMC 5.1; 64 GB
- Removable storage: microSD, expandable up to 512 GB
- Battery: Non-removable 3580 mAh
- Rear camera: 13 MP, f/2.0, 26mm (wide), 1/3", PDAF; 5 MP, f/2.2, 17mm, 1/5" (ultrawide); 2 MP, f/2.4, 1/5" (depth sensor)
- Front camera: 8 MP, f/2.0, 27mm (wide), 1/4", 1.12 μm, 1080p@30fps
- Display: 6.2 in (157 mm) 720p (1680 x 720) IPS LCD, 295 pixel density, Gorilla Glass
- Sound: Loudspeaker, 3.5mm headphone jack
- Connectivity: Wi-Fi 802.11 a/b/g/n/ac (2.4/5GHz); Bluetooth 5.0; USB-C; NFC; GPS with Assisted GPS; GLONASS
- Data inputs: Sensors: Accelerometer; Barometer; Fingerprint scanner (side-mounted, always on); Gyroscope; Proximity sensor
- Model: XQ-AD51, XQ-AD52
- Website: Official website

The Sony Xperia L4 is an Android smartphone marketed and manufactured by Sony. Part of Sony's Xperia series, it was unveiled on February 20, 2020. The Xperia L4 is also the last phone of Sony's own budget device as they didn't launched a successor to the Xperia L4 in 2021.

== Design ==
The Xperia L4 has a polycarbonate unibody construction, with Corning Gorilla Glass protecting the screen. The top bezel houses the earpiece, notification LED and various sensors, with a small cutout at the top of the display housing the front-facing camera. The fingerprint sensor, power button and volume rocker are located on the right side of the device opposite the SIM card tray, while the 3.5mm headphone jack is located on the top. The rear cameras are located at the upper left-hand corner of the phone, with the LED flash above. The bottom edge has the primary microphone and a downward-firing speaker next to the USB-C port. Two colors are available: black and blue.

== Specifications ==
=== Hardware ===
The chipset is carried over from the L3, a MediaTek Helio P22 SoC and the PowerVR GE8320 GPU. It is available with 3 GB of RAM and 64 GB of eMMC storage; MicroSD card expansion is supported up to 512 GB with a single-SIM or hybrid dual-SIM setup. The display uses a 6.2-inch (157.5mm) 21:9 720p (1680 × 720) IPS LCD panel which results in a pixel density of 295 ppi. The L4 has a 3580mAh battery, slightly larger than the L3. Power and data connections are provided through the USB-C port. A triple camera setup is present on the rear, with a 13 MP primary sensor with PDAF, a 5 MP ultrawide sensor and a 2 MP depth sensor. The front-facing camera has an 8 MP sensor.

=== Software ===
The Xperia L4 runs on Android 9 "Pie" with no official software updates. Security updates where available for this phone until it was unsupported in early 2022.

Preceded by Sony Xperia L3	Sony Xperia L4; 2020	Most recent
