= Sony Xperia acro HD SO-03D =

Japan smartphone

Xperia acro HD SO-03D
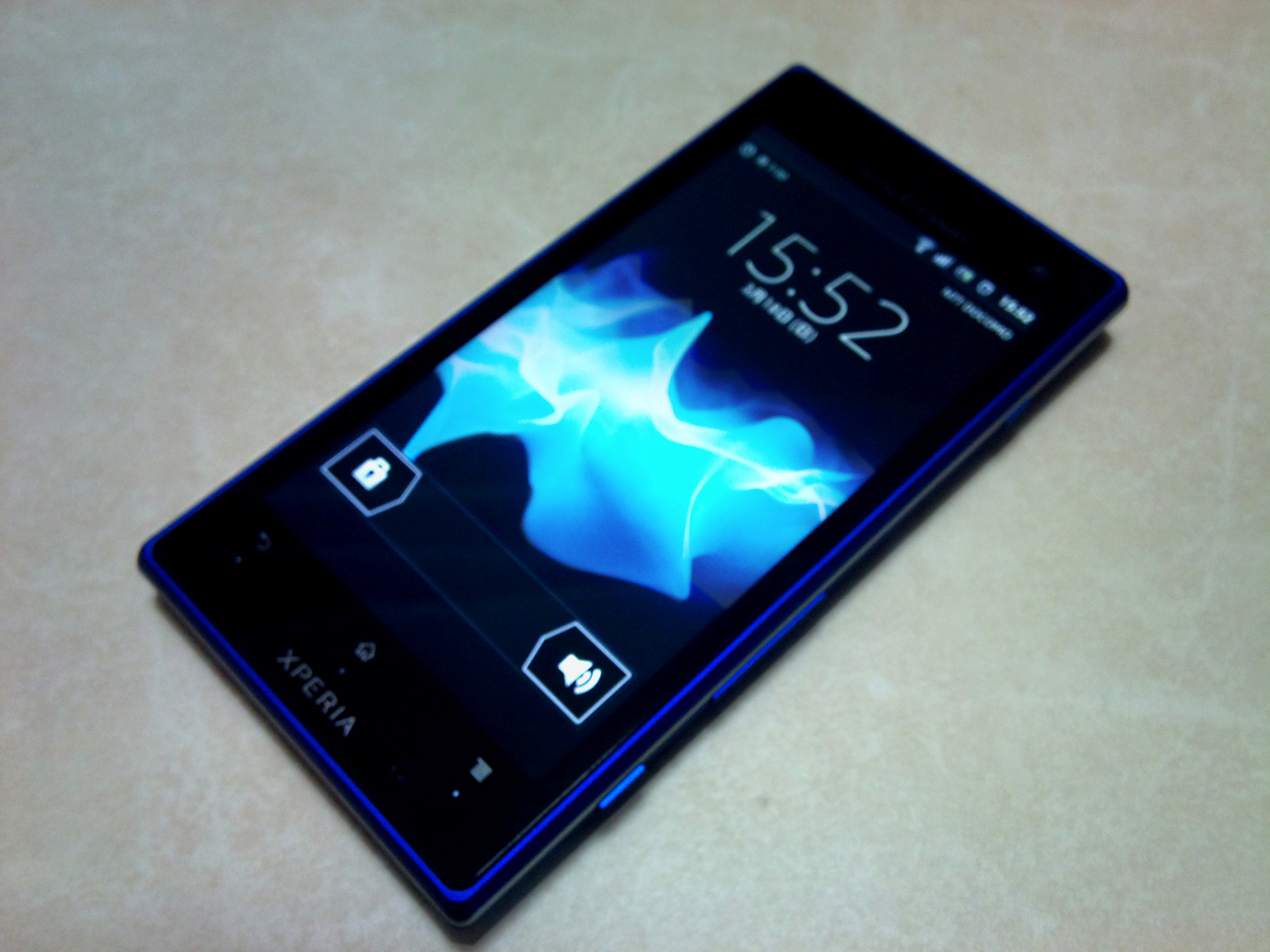
- Front view of SO-03D Aqua
- Brand: NTT Docomo
- Manufacturer: Sony Mobile Communications
- First released: March 15, 2012; 14 years ago
- Compatible networks: 3G: FOMA (W-CDMA); 2G: GSM
- Form factor: Slate (Touchscreen), Waterproof
- Colors: Aqua; Sakura; Black; Ceramic
- Dimensions: 126 mm (5.0 in) H 66 mm (2.6 in) W 11.9 mm (0.47 in) D
- Weight: 149 g (5.3 oz)
- Operating system: Android 2.3.7 (upgradable to 4.0.4)
- CPU: 1.5 GHz dual-core Qualcomm Snapdragon MSM8260
- Storage: 16 GB
- Removable storage: microSD (up to 2 GB), microSDHC (up to 32 GB)
- Battery: 1840 mAh non-removable
- Rear camera: 12.1 MP back-illuminated CMOS Exmor R for mobile, f/2.4, autofocus, face detection, image stabilization, 1080p HD video recording
- Front camera: 1.3 MP CMOS
- Display: 4.3 in (110 mm) TFT LCD, HD (1280 × 720 pixels), 16,777,216 colors, 342 ppi
- Connectivity: Wi-Fi (IEEE 802.11b/g/n), Bluetooth 2.1 + EDR, Infrared, FeliCa (Osaifu-Keitai), 1seg TV, FM radio

The docomo with series Xperia acro HD SO-03D is an Android smartphone manufactured by Sony Mobile Communications for NTT Docomo. It is a 3rd generation mobile communication system (FOMA) terminal offered under the docomo with series lineup.

== History ==
- January 10, 2012 – Announced by Sony Ericsson (at the time) at the Consumer Electronics Show (CES).
- January 10, 2012 – The Japanese market model was officially announced by NTT Docomo.
- March 2, 2012 – Pre-orders opened in Japan.
- March 15, 2012 – Official release and sales began.
- November 26, 2012 – The Android 4.0 update rollout commenced. The update was originally planned for July but was postponed.
- November 30, 2018 – Official repair support for the device concluded.

== Specifications ==
=== Hardware ===
Rear panel view

The Xperia acro HD SO-03D serves as the successor to the SO-02C model in the docomo NEXT series. It introduces an HD LCD screen, a dual-core 1.5GHz CPU, and IPX5/IPX7 waterproof capabilities, though it does not support Xi LTE networks. The design incorporates metal-style side accent lines to create a visually slim profile, and it utilizes a standard-sized mini-SIM (FOMA UIM card).

A global variant was released as the Sony Xperia acro S. The global version omits Japanese-specific features such as 1seg TV broadcasting and infrared communication, replacing Osaifu-Keitai with NFC technology.

Unlike previous models, the battery is integrated and non-removable by the user. Battery replacements required sending the device to a service center for a fee of 9,240 yen. It was the only standard "with series" model featuring a non-removable battery and had the highest battery replacement fee among Docomo smartphones prior to the release of the SO-02E.

=== Software ===
The device originally launched with Android 2.3.7 Gingerbread and received an official system update to Android 4.0.4 Ice Cream Sandwich on November 27, 2012. While the global Xperia acro S received an update to Android 4.1.2 Jelly Bean, the SO-03D did not receive upgrades beyond Android 4.0.4.

Supported core services comprise touchscreen input, accelerometer, FOMA High-Speed (14 Mbps downlink / 5.7 Mbps uplink), Bluetooth, DCMX, Osaifu-Keitai, Infrared, Toruca, 1seg TV, FM Radio, Melody Call, Tethering, IEEE 802.11b/g/n Wi-Fi, GPS, sp-mode, Email, Phonebook Backup, Decome, i-channel, Area Mail, automatic software updates, digital audio playback (WMA, MP3), 3G World Wing international roaming, full web browser with Flash Player 11.1, Google services, and Docomo Map Navigation.

== Known issues ==
- April 4, 2012, update: Addressed a issue where the phone would occasionally reboot upon powering on.
- May 15, 2012, update: Fixed a bug where charging would fail to start even when the charging LED illuminated.
- November 27, 2012, update (OS Version Upgrade): Upgraded the OS to Android 4.0, added Face Unlock, integrated Google+, Messenger, Play Movies, Walkman, Album, Movie, Video Unlimited, Music Unlimited, Reader, and PlayStation Mobile apps, enabled SMS template replies for rejected incoming calls, and fixed an issue where inserting a microSDXC card would corrupt card data (without adding official microSDXC compatibility).
- August 6, 2013, update: Resolved an issue where alarms set via "Shabette-Concier" failed to ring, fixed integration issues between Timescape and third-party apps, and updated the build number from 6.1.F.0.106 to 6.1.F.0.128.
