= Sony Ericsson Xperia Pro =

Smartphone by Sony Ericsson

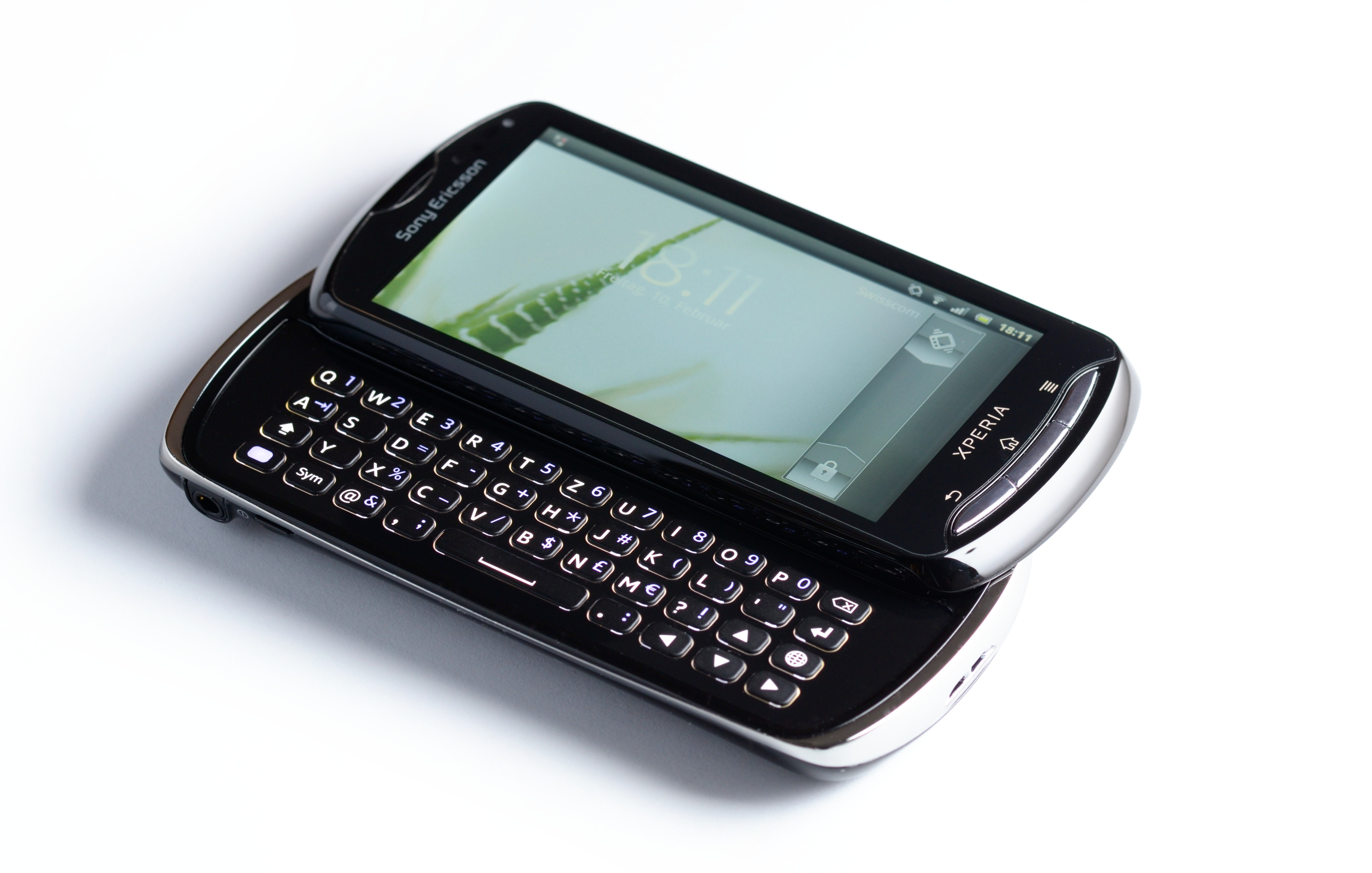
- Manufacturer: Sony Ericsson
- Series: Sony Ericsson Xperia
- Availability by region: October 2011
- Form factor: Slider smartphone (black, silver, red)
- Dimensions: 120×57×13.5 mm (4.72×2.24×0.53 in)
- Weight: 142 g (5 oz)
- Operating system: Android 2.3 (upgradable to Android 4.0.4)
- CPU: Qualcomm MSM 8255 1GHz Scorpion (Snapdragon)
- Storage: (External) With Android 2.3 up to 32GB with Android 4.04 up to 256GB on microSD memory card, (Internal) 1GB; 320 MB user available, 512MB RAM
- Battery: Li-Po 1.5Ah
- Rear camera: 8.1MP (3,264×2,448), Exmor R CMOS Sensor, Auto Focus, Continuous Focus, Face recognition, Geo-tagging, Image and video stabilizer, Smile detection, Touch focus, Video 720p HD (Android 2.3)
- Front camera: VGA Camera
- Display: 3.7-inch 854×480 px FWVGA "Reality Display" TFT LCD at 265 PPI with Mobile BRAVIA Engine, 16M Colors
- Connectivity: Bluetooth with A2DP microUSB 2.0 (host); 3.5mm audio jack aGPS; Wi-Fi 802.11 b/g/n HDMI
- Data inputs: Multi-touch capacitive touchscreen, Accelerometer

The Sony Ericsson Xperia Pro is an Android smartphone from Sony Ericsson which was launched in October 2011. The Xperia Pro has a 3.7-inch (94 mm) capacitive touch-screen, slider keyboard, smart phone with mobile BRAVIA engine which optimises the picture and runs at a resolution of 854×480 pixels, a 1 GHz Snapdragon processor, an 8.1 mega-pixel camera, a dedicated Two-step camera key, USB host port, HDMI-out, 512 MB of onboard RAM, and an 8 GB microSD card (expandable up to 32 GB with Android 2.3; up to 256 GB with Android 4.04). The Sony Ericsson Xperia Pro is available in black, silver, or red.

== Overview ==
The Xperia Pro comes pre-installed with the Android 2.3 (Gingerbread) operating system. As of June 2012, Sony Xperia Pro users can upgrade their phone through Sony Update to Android 4.0.4 (Ice Cream Sandwich).

A number of users have, after upgrading to Android 4.0.x Ice Cream Sandwich, encountered a problem with the QWERTY physical keyboard being changed to AZERTY format and vice versa. This issue has been resolved as of 1 September 2012.

It has one front-facing camera, one rear camera with flash, and a back-lit, sliding, qwerty keyboard – just like other Xperia pro variants.

The display features a Sony Mobile BRAVIA Engine which allows users to view pictures and video on the 3.7" Reality display.

It also features an Exmor R sensor that allows for the capture of high definition movies and stills in low lit areas, which can then be shown in HD on a TV via the HDMI connector.

== Reception ==
The Xperia Pro was first revealed on 13 February 2011, a day before MWC 2011, along with Xperia Play and Xperia Neo.

== See also ==
- List of Android smartphones
- List of Xperia devices
