= Sony Xperia L2 =

Sony android smartphone

- Brand: Sony
- Manufacturer: Sony Mobile Communications
- Type: Touchscreen smartphone
- Series: Sony Xperia
- First released: 4 January 2018
- Discontinued: March 15, 2020
- Predecessor: Sony Xperia L1; Sony Xperia R1
- Successor: Sony Xperia L3
- Colors: Gold, Pink, Black
- Operating system: Android 7.1.1 "Nougat"
- System-on-chip: MediaTek MT6737T
- CPU: Quad-core 64-bit
- GPU: Mali T720 MP2
- Memory: 3 GB RAM
- Storage: 32 GB
- Removable storage: Up to 256 GB microSDXC
- SIM: Nano, Dual Sim
- Battery: non-user removable Li-ion 3300 mAh
- Rear camera: Single-Camera Setup; Sony Exmor RS IMX 258; 13 MP, f/2.0, 26mm (wide), 1/3.06", 1.12μm, AF; Features: LED flash, HDR; Video: 1080p@30fps
- Front camera: Sony Exmor R IMX 219; 8 MP, f/2.4, 11mm, FoV 120°, 1/4.0", 1.12μm; Video: 1080p@30fps
- Display: 5.5 in (140 mm) 720p IPS LCD; HD 1280 x 720 px
- Connectivity: Wi-Fi 802.11 a/b/g/n/ac (2.4/5GHz); Bluetooth 5.0; USB-C; NFC; GPS with Assisted GPS; GLONASS
- Data inputs: Multi-touch, capacitive touchscreen, proximity sensor
- Other: nano-SIM
- Website: Official website

The Sony Xperia L2 is an Android smartphone manufactured by Sony Mobile Communications. It was announced and released in January 2018.

== Specifications ==
=== Hardware ===
The device features a 5.5-inch (14 cm) 720p IPS screen. It is powered by a MediaTek MT6737T quad-core processor and has 3 GB of RAM and 32 GB of internal storage, expandable via microSD.

The rear-facing camera of the Xperia L2 is 13 megapixels. The front-facing camera is 8 MP.

The device has:

- 3300 mAh baterry.
- USB Type-C port.
- 3.5 mm headphone jack.
- fingersprint sensor.

It supports 4G LTE, Wi-Fi, Bluetooth 4.2, and NFC. The Xperia L2 does not have an IP code, meaning ot is not officially certified for water or dust resistance.

=== Software ===
The Xperia L2 is preinstalled with Android 7.1.1 Nougat with Sony's custom interface and software.

Sony´s applications and system features for multimedia, connectivity, and a device management.

Preceded by Sony Xperia L1	Sony Xperia L2; 2018	Succeeded by Sony Xperia L3
