= Sony Xperia XA2 =

Sony android smartphone

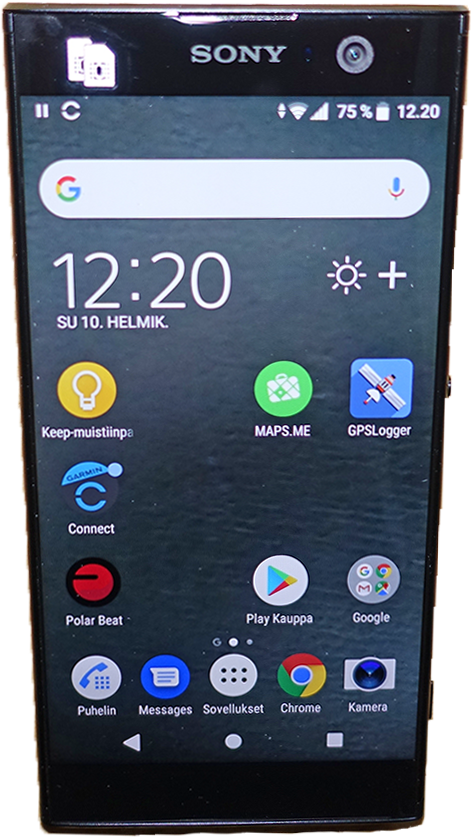
- Brand: Sony
- Manufacturer: Sony Mobile Communications
- Type: Touchscreen smartphone
- Series: Sony Xperia
- Family: Sony Xperia XA series
- First released: 1 February 2018; 8 years ago
- Predecessor: Sony Xperia XA1
- Successor: Sony Xperia 10
- Related: Sony Xperia XA2 Ultra; Sony Xperia XA2 Plus
- Compatible networks: 2G; 3G; 4G; 4G LTE
- Form factor: Slate
- Colors: Silver; Black; Blue; Pink
- Dimensions: 142 mm (5.6 in) H 70 mm (2.8 in) W 9.7 mm (0.38 in) D
- Weight: 171 g (6.0 oz)
- Operating system: Android 8.0 "Oreo" (Upgradable to Android 9 "Pie")
- System-on-chip: Qualcomm Snapdragon 630
- CPU: Octa-core 2.2 GHz Cortex-A53
- GPU: Adreno 508
- Memory: 3 GB RAM
- Storage: 32 GB
- Removable storage: microSD, expandable up to 256 GB
- Battery: Non-removable 3300 mAh
- Rear camera: Single-Camera Setup; Sony Exmor RS IMX 300; 23 MP, f/2.0, 24mm (wide), 1/2.3", PDAF; Features: LED flash, HDR, panorama; Video: 4K@30fps, 1080p@30fps, stereo sound rec., HDR
- Front camera: Sony Exmor R IMX 219; 8 MP, f/2.4, 11mm, FoV 120°, 1/4.0", 1.12μm; Video: 1080p@30fps
- Display: 5.2 in (130 mm) 1080p IPS LCD, ~424 pixel density, Gorilla Glass 4
- Media: Music, Xperia Album
- Connectivity: Wi-Fi 802.11 a/b/g/n (2.4/5GHz) Bluetooth 5.0, USB-C, NFC, location (GPS, Galileo, GLONASS, BeiDou)
- Data inputs: Sensors: Accelerometer; Fingerprint scanner (rear-mounted); Proximity sensor
- Model: H3113, H3123, H3133, H4113, H4133
- Codename: Pioneer
- Development status: Discontinued
- Website: Official Website

The Sony Xperia XA2 is an Android smartphone manufactured and marketed by Sony. Part of the Xperia X series, the device was announced to the public along with the Xperia XA2 Ultra and Xperia L2 at the annual 2018 Consumer Electronics Show on January 8, 2018. This was the last Sony phone to have the Sony logo above the screen on the front of the Phone.

== Specifications ==
=== Hardware ===
The device features a 5.2-inch (13 cm) 1080p screen.

The rear-facing camera of the Xperia XA2 is 23 megapixels. The front-facing camera is 8 MP. The Xperia XA2 was the last Xperia to have a dedicated shutter button in the Sony midrange series until its reintroduction, albeit with a different mechanism, on Sony Xperia 10 VII.

=== Software ===
The Xperia XA2 is preinstalled with Android 8.0 Oreo with Sony's custom interface and software. It is upgradable to Android 9 Pie.

Preceded by Sony Xperia XA1	Sony Xperia XA2; 2018	Succeeded by Sony Xperia 10
