= Sony Xperia XA1 Plus =

2017 Android smartphone from Sony

- Brand: Sony
- Manufacturer: Sony Mobile Communications Inc.
- Series: Xperia
- First released: August 2017
- Availability by region: October 2017; 8 years ago
- Successor: Sony Xperia XA2 Plus
- Dimensions: 155 mm (6.1 in) H 75 mm (3.0 in) W 8.7 mm (0.34 in) D
- Weight: 89 g (3.1 oz)
- Operating system: Android 7.0 "Nougat"; Upgradable to Android 8.0 "Oreo"
- CPU: MediaTek helio P20 Octa Core 64bit (Quad Core 2.3GHz + Quad Core 1.6GHz)
- GPU: Mali-T880MP2
- Memory: 3/4GB RAM
- Storage: 32GB
- Removable storage: microSDXC, up to 256GB
- Battery: 3430 mAh
- Rear camera: 23MP
- Front camera: 8MP
- Display: 5.5 in Full HD 1080p
- Connectivity: Wi-Fi 802.11, a/b/g/n; Bluetooth® 4.2 wireless technology, aptX / A2DP; USB-C
- Codename: Teak
- Other: Gorilla Glass
- Website: Official website

The Sony Xperia XA1 Plus is an Android touchscreen smartphone developed by Sony Mobile. It was released in August, 2017. It is equipped with Android 7.0 (Nougat), a 3430 mAh battery, a 5.5 in display, and a 23 MP main camera.

== Specifications ==
=== Hardware ===
The Sony Xperia XA1 Plus has a 5.5 in Full HD 1080p display. The phone has a MediaTek helio P20 Octa Core 64bit (Quad Core 2.3 GHz + Quad Core 1.6 GHz) CPU and a Mali-T880MP2 GPU. It also comes with 3/4 GB RAM and 32 GB internal storage. It can be expanded via microSDXC, up to 256 GB additional storage. The phone measures 155 mm × 75 mm × 8.7 mm. It comes with a non-removable 3430 mAh battery and Quick Charging.

==== Camera ====
The Sony Xperia XA1 Plus is equipped with an impressive 23 MP back-facing camera, which is complemented by an 8 MP forward-facing camera.

=== Software ===
The Sony Xperia XA1 Plus comes standard with Android 7.0 (Nougat), but is upgradable to Android 8.0 (Oreo).

== History ==
The Sony Xperia XA1 Plus was unveiled in August 2017 and was available in October of the same year.

== See also ==
- Sony Mobile Communications Inc.
- Sony Xperia
