= Sony Xperia =

Smartphone brand from Sony Mobile Communications

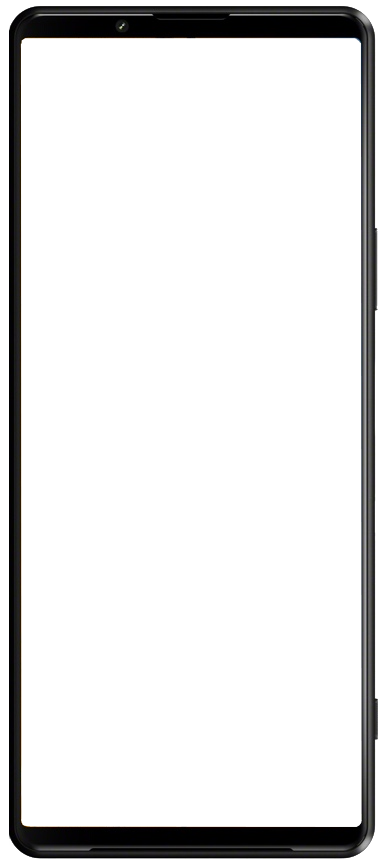
- The front face of Xperia 1 III
- Manufacturer: Sony Ericsson Mobile Communications (2008–2012); Sony Mobile Communications (2012–2021); Sony Corporation (2021–present)
- Type: Smartphones, tablets, phablets
- Released: 27 October 2008; 17 years ago
- Operating system: Android (since 2010); Windows Mobile (2008–2010)
- System on a chip: Snapdragon; MediaTek; Others (NovaThor and Tegra)
- Input: Touchscreen

Xperia (Japanese: エクスペリア, Hepburn: Ekusuperia; /ɛkˈspɪəriə/) is a series of, and the sole brand name of, smartphones marketed by Sony. It also includes various related mobile hardware such as tablets as well as software. Xperia was originally developed by Sony Ericsson before becoming Sony Mobile as a result of the mobile phone manufacturer being taken over and solely owned by Sony in 2012; it has been under Sony Corporation since 2021 following Sony Mobile's merger. The name Xperia is derived from the word "experience", and was first used in the Xperia X1 tagline, "I Xperia the best". The latest flagship smartphone of the brand is the Xperia 1 VIII.

== History ==
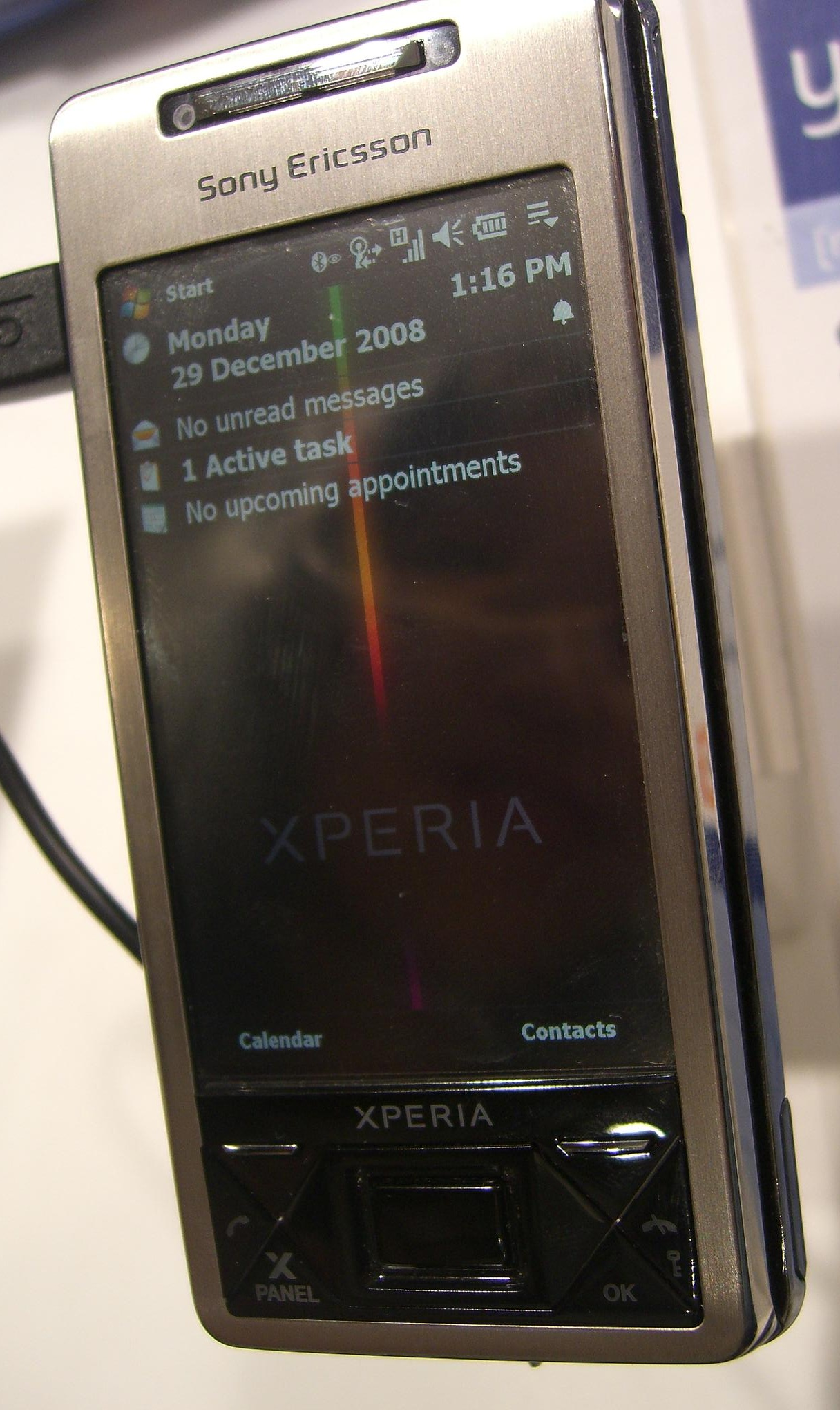
Windows-powered Xperia X1, the very first Xperia device

The Xperia X1 was the first phone to be released in the Xperia range. Released in 2008, it featured a high resolution display (~311 ppi pixel density) and it was intended to fill the widening gap of smartphones as other competitors were producing high-end smartphone devices such as HTC and Apple.

The X2 was released in the following year, which included an 8.1 MP camera and included Wifi and GPS. By this time there was a clear shift towards the smartphone end of the spectrum. An exception was the Xperia Pureness, a translucent phone without camera that was sold by selected retailers in selected cities. The Xperia X5 Pureness is based on Sony Ericsson's proprietary operating system (OSE).

The X10 was released at the start of 2010. It was the first in the Xperia line to feature the Android operating system, where previous models ran on the Windows Mobile OS. The phone was praised on its design, but its downfall was its use of Android 1.6 at a time when competitors were on 2.1. There was a great delay in the update of the firmware, due to the heavily skinned OS, as well as Timescape and Mediascape which needed to be reprogrammed every time an update was made. The phone also lacked pinch to zoom, but this was added later as well as HD video recording.

The X10 Mini and the X10 Mini Pro were, as the names suggest, smaller versions of the X10. These were received relatively well and proved to be very popular, as there were no other smartphones on the market at that time which were as small as the two.

The Z series smartphones continued the Xperia legacy with an omni-balance design and water resistance. On several Sony Xperia smartphones such as the Xperia Z, the charging port is located at the top of the left edge, rather than popularly at the bottom center.

The Xperia Z is the earliest known device to feature high dynamic range filming, and does it at 1080p. Its image sensor is an Exmor IMX135.

After the Sony Xperia Z (early 2013), the Z1 (late 2013) was released with increased processing performance and a physical shutter button, as well as augmented reality camera effects such as a walking dinosaur.

In early 2014, the Sony Xperia Z2 was introduced with 2160p video recording, 1080p at 60 frames per second, and 720p at 120fps for slow motion, as well as precluded screencasting functionality.

In 2016, Sony introduced the new Xperia X series to replace the Z series and in 2018, Sony introduced the Sony Xperia XZ2 along with the Sony Xperia XZ2 Compact at Mobile World Congress 2018 featuring Sony's brand new "Ambient Flow" smartphone design while the premium smartphone, the Sony Xperia XZ2 Premium featuring a 4K HDR Display and a 19 MP + 12 MP MotionEye Dual camera built for 'extreme' low-light shooting was announced two months later.

Sony has been criticized for the heavily inconsistent naming of their Xperia devices.

== Default software ==
Software that comes preloaded on current (2023) Sony Xperia devices include:

- Music, a music player
- Music Pro, music recording with AI studio processing
- Video Pro, "premium" video recording feature
- Cinema Pro, "premium" video recording feature
- PlayStation App, voice chat and PS Store integration
- Creators' App, for imaging
- Game Enhancer, improves gaming on Xperia
- Bravia Core, Sony Pictures movies on demand service

Several other stock software had existed in the past but are no longer made, including Xperia Lounge, Album, and Weather.

== Sony Ericsson Xperia products ==
=== Smartphones (Windows Mobile) ===
Code name	Model	Market name	Release date	Windows Mobile version	System on chip	RAM	ROM	Display (inch)	Weight	Battery (mAh)	Physical keyboard	Bluetooth	Wi-Fi	Camera	Network
Venus	X1a; X1c; X1i	Xperia X1	2008–10	6.1	528 MHz Qualcomm MSM7200A	256 MB	512 MB	3 WVGA	146 g	1500	Yes	2.0 + EDR	802.11b/g	Rear: 3.2 MP; Front: QCIF	GSM, HSPA
Vulcan	X2a; X2i	Xperia X2	2010–01	6.5	528 MHz Qualcomm MSM7200A	288 MB	512 MB	3.2 WVGA	155 g	1500	Yes	2.1 + EDR	802.11b/g	Rear: 8 MP; Front: 0.3 MP	GSM, HSPA

=== Smartphones (Android) ===
Code name	Model	Market name	Platform	Release date	Android version	System on chip	RAM	ROM	Display (inch)	Weight	Battery (mAh)	Physical keyboard	Bluetooth	Wi-Fi	Camera	Network
Rachael	X10a; X10i	Xperia X10	Es209ra	2010–03	1.6, 2.1, 2.3	1 GHz Qualcomm Snapdragon S1 QSD8250	384 MB	1 GB	4 FWVGA	135 g	1500	No	2.1 + EDR	802.11b/g	8.1 MP	GSM, HSPA
Mimmi	U20a; U20i	Xperia X10 mini pro	Delta	2010–05	1.6, 2.1	600 MHz Qualcomm Snapdragon S1 MSM7227	256 MB	256 MB	2.55 QVGA	120 g	970	Yes	2.0 + EDR	802.11b/g	5 MP	GSM, HSPA
Robyn	E10a; E10i	Xperia X10 mini	Delta	2010–05	1.6, 2.1	600 MHz Qualcomm Snapdragon S1 MSM7227	256 MB	256 MB	2.55 QVGA	88 g	950	No	2.0 + EDR	802.11b/g	5 MP	GSM, HSPA
Shakira	E15a	Xperia X8	Delta	2010–09	1.6, 2.1	600 MHz Qualcomm Snapdragon S1 MSM7227	168 MB	128 MB	3 HVGA	104 g	1200	No	2.0 + EDR	802.11b/g	3.2 MP	GSM, HSPA
Anzu	LT15a; LT15i; SO-01C	Xperia arc	Mogami	2011–03	2.3, 4.0	1 GHz Qualcomm Snapdragon S2 MSM8255	512 MB	1 GB	4.2 FWVGA	117 g	1500	No	2.1 + EDR	802.11b/g/n	8.1 MP	GSM, HSPA
Hallon	MT15a; MT15i	Xperia neo	Mogami	2011–03	2.3, 4.0	1 GHz Qualcomm Snapdragon S2 MSM8255	512 MB	1 GB	3.7 FWVGA	126 g	1500	No	2.1 + EDR	802.11b/g/n	Rear: 8.1 MP; Front: 0.3 MP	GSM, HSPA
Zeus	R800a; R800at; R800i; SO-01D	Xperia Play	Zeus	2011–03	2.3	1 GHz Qualcomm Snapdragon S2 MSM8255	512 MB	400 MB	4 FWVGA	175 g	1500	No	2.1 + EDR	802.11b/g/n	Rear: 5.1 MP; Front: 0.3 MP	GSM, HSPA
Zeusc	R800x	Xperia Play	Zeus	2011–05	2.3	1 GHz Qualcomm Snapdragon S2 MSM8255	512 MB	400 MB	4 FWVGA	175 g	1500	No	2.1 + EDR	802.11b/g/n	Rear: 5.1 MP; Front: 0.3 MP	CDMA, EV-DO
Akane	SO-02C	Xperia acro	Mogami	2011–06	2.3	1 GHz Qualcomm Snapdragon S2 MSM8655	512 MB	1 GB	4.2 FWVGA	135 g	1500	No	2.1 + EDR	802.11b/g/n	8.1 MP	CDMA, GSM, EV-DO
Azusa	IS11S	Xperia acro	Mogami	2011–06	2.3	1 GHz Qualcomm Snapdragon S2 MSM8255	512 MB	1 GB	4.2 FWVGA	135 g	1500	No	2.1 + EDR	802.11b/g/n	8.1 MP	GSM, HSPA
Mango	SK17a	Xperia mini pro	Mogami	2011–08	2.3, 4.0	1 GHz Qualcomm Snapdragon S2 MSM8255	512 MB	1 GB	3 HVGA	136 g	1200	Yes	2.1 + EDR	802.11b/g/n	Rear: 5 MP; Front: 0.3 MP	GSM, HSPA
Coconut	WT19i	Live with Walkman	Mogami	2011–08	2.3, 4.0	1 GHz Qualcomm Snapdragon S2 MSM8255	512 MB	400 MB	3.2 HVGA	115 g	1200	No	2.1 + EDR	802.11b/g/n	Rear: 5 MP; Front: 0.3 MP	GSM, HSPA
Smultron	ST15a; ST15i	Xperia mini	Mogami	2011–08	2.3, 4.0	1 GHz Qualcomm Snapdragon S2 MSM8255	512 MB	1 GB	3 HVGA	99 g	1200	No	2.1 + EDR	802.11b/g/n	5 MP	GSM, HSPA
Urushi	ST18a; ST18i; SO-03C	Xperia ray	Mogami	2011–08	2.3, 4.0	1 GHz Qualcomm Snapdragon S2 MSM8255	512 MB	1 GB	3.3 FWVGA	100 g	1500	No	2.1 + EDR	802.11b/g/n	Rear: 8.1 MP; Front: 0.3 MP	GSM, HSPA
Ayame	LT18a; LT18i	Xperia arc S	Mogami	2011-Q3	2.3, 4.0	1.4 GHz Qualcomm Snapdragon S2 MSM8255	512 MB	1 GB	4.2 FWVGA	117 g	1500	No	2.1 + EDR	802.11b/g/n	8.1 MP	GSM, HSPA
Haida	MT11a; MT11i	Xperia neo V	Mogami	2011-Q3	2.3, 4.0	1 GHz Qualcomm Snapdragon S2 MSM8255	512 MB	1 GB	3.7 FWVGA	126 g	1500	No	2.1 + EDR	802.11b/g/n	Rear: 5 MP; Front: 0.3 MP	GSM, HSPA
Satsuma	ST17a; ST17i	Xperia active	Mogami	2011-Q3	2.3, 4.0	1 GHz Qualcomm Snapdragon S2 MSM8255	512 MB	1 GB	3 HVGA	110.8 g	1200	No	2.1 + EDR	802.11b/g/n	5 MP	GSM, HSPA
Iyokan	MK16a; MK16i	Xperia pro	Mogami	2011–10	2.3, 4.0	1 GHz Qualcomm Snapdragon S2 MSM8255	512 MB	1 GB	3.7 FWVGA	142 g	1500	Yes	2.1 + EDR	802.11b/g/n	Rear: 8.1 MP; Front: 0.3 MP	GSM, HSPA

=== Feature phones ===
Code name	Market name	Release date	System on chip	RAM	ROM	Display (inch)	Weight	Battery (mAh)	Physical keyboard	Bluetooth	Wi-Fi	Camera	Network
Kiki	Xperia X5 Pureness	2009–11	—N/a	—N/a	2 GB	1.8 QVGA	70 g	—N/a	No	2.1 + EDR	No	No	GSM, HSPA

== Sony Xperia smartphones ==
Model	Release date	Market name	Android version	System on chip	RAM	ROM	Display	Weight	Battery (mAh)	Bluetooth	Wi-Fi	NFC	Camera	Network
LT26a; LT26i; SO-02D	2012–02	Xperia S/NX/arc HD	2.3, 4.0, 4.1	1.5 GHz Qualcomm Snapdragon S3 MSM8260, dual-core	1 GB	32 GB	4.3 HD	144 g	1750	2.1 + EDR	802.11b/g/n	Yes	Rear: 12.1 MP; Front: 1.3 MP	GSM, HSPA+
LT28at; LT28i; LT28h	2012–03	Xperia ion	2.3, 4.0, 4.1	1.5 GHz Qualcomm Snapdragon S3 APQ8060, dual-core	1 GB	16 GB	4.55 HD	144 g	1900	2.1 + EDR	802.11b/g/n	Yes	Rear: 12 MP; Front: 1.3 MP	GSM, HSPA+, LTE (Note: The LT28i variant of the Xperia ion is LTE capable, while the LT28h variant is not LTE capable.)
IS12S	2012–03	Xperia acro HD	2.3, 4.0	1.5 GHz Qualcomm Snapdragon S3 MSM8660, dual-core	1 GB	11 GB	4.3 HD	149 g	1900	2.1	802.11b/g/n	No	Rear: 12.1 MP; Front: 1.3 MP	CDMA, GSM, HSPA+
SO-03D; LT26w	2012–03 (HD); 2012–08 (S)	Xperia acro HD; Xperia acro S	2.3, 4.0, 4.1	1.5 GHz Qualcomm Snapdragon S3 MSM8260, dual-core	1 GB	11 GB (HD); 16 GB (S)	4.3 HD	149 g (HD); 147 g (S)	1910	2.1 (HD); 3.0 (S)	802.11b/g/n	Yes	Rear: 12.1 MP; Front: 1.3 MP	GSM, HSPA+
MT27i	2012–03	Xperia sola	2.3, 4.0	1 GHz ST-Ericsson NovaThor U8500, dual-core	512 MB	8 GB	3.7 FWVGA	107 g	1320	2.1 + EDR	802.11b/g/n	Yes	5 MP	GSM, W-CDMA
MT25i	2012–03	Xperia neo L	4.0	1 GHz Qualcomm Snapdragon S2 MSM8255	512 MB	1 GB	4 FWVGA	131.5 g	1500	2.1 + EDR	802.11b/g/n	No	Rear: 5 MP; Front: 0.3 MP	GSM, HSPA
LT22i	2012–04	Xperia P	2.3, 4.0, 4.1	1 GHz ST-Ericsson NovaThor U8500, dual-core	1 GB	16 GB	4 qHD	126 g	1305	2.1 + EDR	802.11b/g/n	Yes	Rear: 8 MP; Front: 0.3 MP	GSM, HSPA+
ST25a; ST25i	2012–05	Xperia U	2.3, 4.0	1 GHz ST-Ericsson NovaThor U8500, dual-core	512 MB	4 GB	3.5 FWVGA	110 g	1320	2.1 + EDR	802.11b/g/n	No	Rear: 5 MP; Front: 0.3 MP	GSM, HSPA+
ST27a; ST27i	2012–07	Xperia advance/go	2.3, 4.0, 4.1	1 GHz ST-Ericsson NovaThor U8500, dual-core	512 MB	8 GB	3.5 HVGA	110 g	1305	3.0	802.11b/g/n	No	5 MP	GSM, HSPA+
MT28i; SO-05D	2012–08	Xperia SX	4.0	1.5 GHz Qualcomm Snapdragon S4 Plus MSM8960, dual-core	1 GB	4 GB	3.7 qHD	95 g	1500	3.1	802.11b/g/n, dual-band	No	Rear: 8.1 MP; Front: 0.3 MP	GSM, W-CDMA, LTE
ST21a; ST21a2; ST21i; ST21i2	2012–08	Xperia tipo Xperia tipo dual	4.0	800 MHz Qualcomm Snapdragon S1 MSM7225A	512 MB	2.9 GB	3.2 HVGA	99.4 g	1500	2.1 + EDR	802.11b/g/n	No	3.2 MP	GSM, HSPA (Note: The "dual" variant has dual GSM SIM card slots.)
LT29i; SO-04D	2012–09	Xperia TX; Xperia GX	4.0, 4.1, 4.3	1.5 GHz Qualcomm Snapdragon S4 Plus MSM8260A, dual-core	1 GB	16 GB	4.55 HD	127 g	1750 (BA900)	3.1	802.11b/g/n, dual-band	Yes	Rear: 13 MP; Front: 1.3 MP	GSM, HSPA+
ST23a; ST23i	2012–09	Xperia miro	4.0	800 MHz Qualcomm Snapdragon S1 MSM7225A	512 MB	4 GB	3.5 HVGA	110 g	1500	2.1 + EDR	802.11b/g/n	No	Rear: 5 MP; Front: 0.3 MP	GSM, HSPA
LT30a; LT30at; LT30p	2012–09	Xperia T Xperia TL	4.0, 4.1, 4.3	1.5 GHz Qualcomm Snapdragon S4 Plus dual-core, MSM8260A (non-LTE) or MSM8960 (LTE) (Note: The LT30a variant of the Xperia T & the Xperia TL both have LTE capable SoCs & radios, while the LT30p variant is not LTE capable.)	1 GB	16 GB	4.55 HD	139 g (non-LTE); 148 g (LTE)	1850	3.1	802.11a/b/g/n, dual-band	Yes	Rear: 13 MP; Front: 1.3 MP	GSM, HSPA+ (Non-LTE); GSM, HSPA+, LTE (LTE)
LT26ii	2012–09	Xperia SL	2.3, 4.0, 4.1	1.7 GHz Qualcomm Snapdragon S3 MSM8260, dual-core	1 GB	32 GB	4.3 HD	144 g	1750	3.0	802.11b/g/n	Yes	Rear: 12.1 MP; Front: 1.3 MP	GSM, HSPA+
ST26a; ST26i	2012–10	Xperia J	4.0, 4.1	1 GHz Qualcomm Snapdragon S1 MSM7227A	512 MB	4 GB	4 FWVGA	124 g	1750 (BA900)	2.1 + EDR	802.11b/g/n	No	Rear: 5 MP; Front: 0.3 MP	GSM, HSPA
LT25a; LT25i; LT25c; SO-01E; SOL21	2012–12	Xperia V Xperia AX; Xperia VL; Xperia VC	4.0, 4.1, 4.2, 4.3	1.5 GHz Qualcomm Snapdragon S4 Plus MSM8960, dual-core	1 GB	8 GB (V); 16 GB (AX/VL)	4.3 HD	120 g	1750	4.0	802.11b/g/n, dual-band	Yes	Rear: 13 MP; Front: 0.3 MP	GSM, HSPA+, LTE (V); GSM, HSPA+, LTE (AX); CDMA, GSM, HSPA+, LTE (VL); GSM, HSPA+ (VC)
L36h/C6602; L36i/C6603; L36a/C6606; C6616; SO-02E	2013–02	Xperia Z	4.1, 4.2, 4.3, 4.4, 5.0, 5.1	1.5 GHz Qualcomm Snapdragon S4 Pro APQ8064, quad-core	2 GB	16 GB	5 FHD	146 g	2330	4.0	802.11a/b/g/n, dual-band	Yes	Rear: 13.1 MP; Front: 2.2 MP	GSM, HSPA+, LTE (Note: The C6603 variant of the Xperia Z is LTE capable, while the C6602 variant is not LTE capable.)
C1504; C1505; C1604; C1605	2013–03	Xperia E Xperia E dual	4.0, 4.1	1 GHz Qualcomm Snapdragon S1 MSM7227A	512 MB	4 GB	3.5 HVGA	115.7 g	1530	2.1 + EDR	802.11b/g/n	No	3.2 MP	GSM, HSPA
C5306; M35h/C5302; M35t-CS; M35t-SG/M35ts; M35c	2013–04	Xperia SP	4.1, 4.3	1.7 GHz Qualcomm Snapdragon S4 Pro MSM8960T, dual-core	1 GB	8 GB	4.6 HD	155 g	2370	4.0	802.11a/b/g/n, dual-band	Yes	Rear: 8 MP; Front: 0.3 MP	GSM, HSPA+, LTE (Note: The C5303 & C5306 variants of the Xperia SP are LTE capable, while the C5302 variant is not LTE capable.)
L35i/C6503; L35a/C6506; L35h/C6502	2013–04	Xperia ZL; Xperia ZQ	4.1, 4.2, 4.3, 4.4, 5.0, 5.1	1.5 GHz Qualcomm Snapdragon S4 Pro APQ8064, quad-core	2 GB	16 GB	5 FHD	151 g	2370	4.0	802.11a/b/g/n, dual-band	Yes	Rear: 13 MP; Front: 2 MP	GSM, HSPA+, LTE (Note: The C6503 & C6506 variants of the Xperia ZL are LTE capable, while the C6502 variant is not LTE capable.)
M36h/C5502; M36i/C5503; SO-04E	2013–05	Xperia ZR; Xperia A	4.1, 4.3, 4.4, 5.0, 5.1.1	1.5 GHz Qualcomm Snapdragon S4 Pro APQ8064, quad-core	2 GB	8 GB (ZR); 32 GB (A)	4.55 HD	138 g	2300	4.0	802.11a/b/g/n, dual-band	Yes	Rear: 13 MP; Front: 0.3 MP	GSM, HSPA+, LTE (Note: The C5503 variant of the Xperia ZR & the Xperia A are LTE capable, while the C5502 variant is not LTE capable.)
SOL22	2013–05	Xperia UL	4.1, 4.2	1.5 GHz Qualcomm Snapdragon S4 Pro APQ8064, quad-core	2 GB	16 GB	5 FHD	145 g	2300	4.0	802.11a/b/g/n, dual-band	Yes	Rear: 13 MP; Front: 0.3 MP	GSM, HSPA+, LTE
C2104; C2105	2013–05	Xperia L	4.1, 4.2	1 GHz Qualcomm Snapdragon S4 Plus MSM8230, dual-core	1 GB	8 GB	4.3 FWVGA	137 g	1750 (BA900)	4.0	802.11a/b/g/n, dual-band	Yes	Rear: 8 MP; Front: 0.3 MP	GSM, HSPA+
C2304; C2305	2013–07	Xperia C	4.2, 4.3	1.2 GHz MediaTek MT6589, quad-core	1 GB	4 GB	5 qHD	153 g	2390	4.0	802.11b/g/n	No	Rear: 8 MP; Front: 0.3 MP	GSM, HSPA+
C1904; C1905; C2004; C2005	2013–08	Xperia M Xperia M dual	4.1, 4.2, 4.3	1 GHz Qualcomm Snapdragon S4 Plus MSM8227, dual-core	1 GB	4 GB	4 FWVGA	115 g	1750 (BA900)	4.0	802.11a/b/g/n, dual-band	Yes	Rear: 5 MP; Front: 0.3 MP	GSM, HSPA+
C6802/XL39h; C6803; C6806; C6833; C6843; SOL24	2013–09	Xperia Z Ultra	4.2, 4.3, 4.4, 5.1	2.2 GHz Qualcomm Snapdragon 800 quad-core, MSM8274 (non-LTE) or MSM8974 (LTE) (Note: The C6833 & C6806 variants of the Xperia Z Ultra are LTE capable, while the C6802 variant is not LTE capable.)	2 GB	16 GB	6.44 FHD	212 g	3050	4.0	802.11a/b/g/n/ac, dual-band	Yes	Rear: 8 MP; Front: 2 MP	GSM, HSPA+, LTE
C6902; C6903; C6906; C6943; L39t; L39u; SO-01F; SOL23	2013–09	Xperia Z1/Z1s	4.2, 4.3, 4.4, 5.0, 5.1.1	2.2 GHz Qualcomm Snapdragon 800 quad-core, MSM8274 (non-LTE) or MSM8974 (LTE) (Note: The C6903, C6906 & C6943 variants of the Xperia Z1 are LTE capable, while the C6902 & L39h variants are not LTE capable.)	2 GB	16 GB	5.0 FHD	170 g	3000	4.0	802.11a/b/g/n/ac, dual-band	Yes	Rear: 20.7 MP; Front: 2 MP	GSM, HSPA+, LTE
D5503; M51w; SO-02F	2014–02	Xperia Z1 Compact/Xperia Z1 f	4.3, 4.4, 5.0, 5.1.1	2.2 GHz Qualcomm Snapdragon 800 MSM8974, quad-core	2 GB	16 GB	4.3 HD	137 g	2300	4.0	802.11a/b/g/n/ac, dual-band	Yes	Rear: 20.7 MP; Front: 2 MP	GSM, HSPA+, LTE
	2014–03	Xperia E1	4.3, 4.4	1.2 GHz Qualcomm Snapdragon 200 MSM8210, dual-core	512 MB	4 GB	4.0 WVGA	120 g	1750 (BA900)	4.0	802.11a/b/g/n, dual-band	No	Rear: 3.15 MP	GSM, HSPA+
	2014–01	Xperia T2 Ultra	4.3, 4.4.2, 4.4.3, 4.4.4, 5.0.2, 5.1.1	1.4 GHz Qualcomm Snapdragon 400 MSM8928, quad-core	1 GB	8 GB	6 HD	172 g	3000	4.0	802.11a/b/g/n/ac, dual-band	Yes	Rear: 13 MP; Front: 1.1 MP	GSM, HSPA+, LTE
	2014–05	Xperia Z2	4.4.2, 4.4.4, 5.0.2, 5.1.1, 6.0.1	2.3 GHz Qualcomm Snapdragon 801 MSM8974AB, quad-core	3 GB	16 GB	5.2 FHD	163 g	3200	4.0	802.11a/b/g/n/ac, dual-band	Yes	Rear: 20.7 MP; Front: 2.2 MP	GSM, HSPA+, LTE
	2014–06; 2015–05	Xperia A2; Xperia J1 Compact	4.4.2, 4.4.4 (J1 Compact only)	2.2 GHz Qualcomm Snapdragon 800, quad-core	2 GB	16 GB	4.3 HD	138 g	2300	4.0	802.11a/b/g/n	Yes	Rear: 20.7 MP; Front: 2.2 MP	GSM, HSPA+, LTE
	2014–03	Xperia M2	4.3, 4.4.4, 5.1.1	1.2 GHz Qualcomm Snapdragon 400, quad-core	1 GB	8 GB	4.8 qHD	148 g	2300	4.0	802.11a/b/g/n/ac, dual-band	Yes	Rear: 8 MP; Front: 0.3 MP	GSM, HSPA+, LTE
	2014–06	Xperia ZL2; Xperia Z2a	4.4.2, 5.0.2, 5.1.1 (Z2a only), 6.0.1 (Z2a only)	2.3 GHz Qualcomm Snapdragon 801 MSM8974AB, quad-core	3 GB	16 GB	5.0 FHD	163 g	3000	4.0	802.11a/b/g/n/ac, dual-band	Yes	Rear: 20.7 MP	GSM, HSPA+, LTE
	2014–07	Xperia T3	4.4.4	1.4 GHz Qualcomm Snapdragon 400 MSM8928-2, quad-core	1 GB	8 GB	5.3 HD	148 g	2500	4.0	802.11a/b/g/n, dual-band	Yes	Rear: 8 MP	GSM, HSPA+, LTE
	2014–08	Xperia C3	4.4.4, 5.0.2, 5.1.1	1.2 GHz Qualcomm Snapdragon 400, quad-core	1 GB	8 GB	5.5 HD	150 g	2500	4.0	802.11b/g/n	Yes	Rear: 8 MP; Front: 5 MP	GSM, HSPA+, LTE
	2014–09	Xperia Z3	4.4.4, 5.0.2, 5.1.1, 6.0.1, N (Developer Preview)	2.5 GHz Qualcomm Snapdragon 801 MSM8974AC, quad-core	3 GB	16/32 GB	5.2 FHD	152 g	3100	4.0	802.11a/b/g/n/ac, dual-band	Yes	Rear: 20.7 MP; Front: 2.2 MP	GSM, HSPA+, LTE
	2014–09	Xperia Z3 Compact	4.4.2, 5.0.2, 5.1.1, 6.0.1	2.5 GHz Qualcomm Snapdragon 801 MSM8974AC, quad-core	2 GB	16 GB	4.6 HD	129 g	2600	4.0	802.11a/b/g/n/ac, dual-band	Yes	Rear: 20.7 MP; Front: 2.2 MP	GSM, HSPA+, LTE
	2014–09	Xperia E3	4.4	1.2 GHz Qualcomm Snapdragon 400, quad-core	1 GB	4 GB	4.5 FWVGA	143.8 g	2330	4.0	802.11b/g/n	Yes	Rear: 5 MP	GSM, HSPA+, LTE
	2015–03	Xperia E4	4.4.4	1.3 GHz MediaTek MT6582, quad-core	1 GB	8 GB	5 qHD	144 g	2300	4.1	802.11b/g/n	No	Rear: 5 MP; Front: 2 MP	GSM, HSPA+
	2015–04	Xperia E4g	4.4.4	1.5 GHz MediaTek MT6732, quad-core	1 GB	8 GB	4.7 qHD	135 g	2300	4.1	802.11a/b/g/n	Yes (Note: Only available for E2003)	Rear: 5 MP; Front: 2 MP	GSM, HSPA+, LTE
	2015–03	Xperia M4 Aqua	5.0, 6.0.1	Snapdragon 615, octa-core (4 × 1.5 GHz, 4 × 1.0 GHz)	2 GB	8 GB (Note: E2303, E2312, E2333, E2353); 16 GB (Note: E2306, E2363)	5 HD	136 g	2400	4.1	802.11a/b/g/n	Yes	Rear: 13 MP; Front: 5 MP	GSM, HSPA+, LTE
	2015–05	Xperia C4	5.0, 5.1, 6.0	1.7 GHz MediaTek MT6752, octa-core	2 GB	16 GB	5.5 FHD	147 g	2600	4.1	802.11a/b/g/n	Yes	Rear: 13 MP; Front: 5 MP	GSM, HSPA+, LTE
	2015–06	Xperia Z3+ Xperia Z4	5.0.2, 6.0, 6.0.1, 7.0, 7.1.1	Snapdragon 810 MSM8994, octa-core (4 × 2.0 GHz, 4 × 1.5 GHz)	3 GB	32 GB	5.2 FHD	144 g	2930	4.1	802.11a/b/g/n/ac, dual-band	Yes	Rear: 20.7 MP; Front: 5 MP	GSM, HSPA+, LTE
	2015–06	Xperia A4	5.0.2	Snapdragon 801 MSM8974AC, quad-core (4 × 2.5 GHz)	2 GB	16 GB	4.6 HD	138 g	2300	4.1	802.11a/b/g/n/ac	Yes	Rear: 20.7 MP; Front: 5 MP	GSM, HSPA+, LTE
	2015–08	Xperia C5 Ultra	5.0, 5.1, 6.0	1.7 GHz MediaTek MT6752, octa-core	2 GB	16 GB	6.0 FHD	187 g	2930	4.1	802.11a/b/g/n	Yes	Rear: 13 MP; Front: 13 MP	GSM, HSPA+, LTE
	2015–09	Xperia M5	5.0, 5.1, 6.0.1	2.0 GHz MediaTek Helio X10, octa-core	3 GB	16 GB	5.0 FHD	142.5 g	2600	4.1	802.11a/b/g/n	Yes	Rear: 21.5 MP; Front: 13 MP	GSM, HSPA+, LTE
E6603; E6633; E6653; E6683 SO-01H SOV32	2015–10	Xperia Z5	5.1.1, 6.0, 6.0.1, 7.0, 7.1.1	Snapdragon 810 MSM8994, octa-core (4 × 2.0 GHz, 4 × 1.5 GHz)	3 GB	32 GB	5.2 FHD	154 g	2900	4.1	802.11a/b/g/n/ac, dual-band, MIMO	Yes	Rear: 23 MP; Front: 5 MP	GSM, HSPA+, LTE
E5803; E5823 SO-02H	2015–10	Xperia Z5 Compact	5.1.1, 6.0, 6.0.1, 7.0, 7.1.1	Snapdragon 810 MSM8994, octa-core (4 × 2.0 GHz, 4 × 1.5 GHz)	2 GB	32 GB	4.6 HD	138 g	2700	4.1	802.11a/b/g/n/ac, dual-band, MIMO	Yes	Rear: 23 MP; Front: 5.1 MP	GSM, HSPA+, LTE
E6833; E6853; E6883 SO-03H	2015–11	Xperia Z5 Premium	5.1.1, 6.0, 6.0.1, 7.0, 7.1.1	Snapdragon 810 MSM8994, octa-core (4 × 2.0 GHz, 4 × 1.5 GHz)	3 GB	32 GB	5.5 4K	181 g	3430	4.1	802.11a/b/g/n/ac, dual-band, MIMO	Yes	Rear: 23 MP; Front: 5.1 MP	GSM, HSPA+, LTE
F5121; F5122	2016–02	Xperia X	6.0.1, 7.0, 7.1.1, 8.0	Snapdragon 650, hexa-core (2 × 1.8 GHz, 4 × 1.4 GHz)	3 GB	32 GB (Single SIM); 64 GB (Dual SIM)	5.0 Full HD 1080p	153 g	2620	4.2	802.11a/b/g/n/ac, dual-band, MIMO	Yes	Rear: 23 MP; Front: 13 MP	GSM, HSPA+, LTE
F3111; F3112; F3113; F3115; F3116	2016–02	Xperia XA	6.0, 7.0	MediaTek MT6755, octa-core 64 bits (4 × 2.0 GHz, 4 × 1.0 GHz)	2 GB	16 GB	5.0 HD 720p	137.4 g	2300	4.1	802.11a/b/g/n, dual-band	Yes	Rear: 13 MP; Front: 8 MP	GSM, HSPA+, LTE
F8131; F8132 SO-04H SOV33	2016–02	Xperia X Performance	6.0.1, 7.0, 7.1.1, 8.0	Snapdragon 820, quad-core 64 bits (2 × 2.15 GHz, 2 × 1.6 GHz)	3 GB	32 GB (Single SIM); 64 GB (Dual SIM)	5.0 Full HD 1080p	164.4 g	2700	4.2	802.11a/b/g/n/ac, dual-band, MIMO	Yes	Rear: 23 MP; Front: 13 MP	GSM, HSPA+, LTE
F3211; F3213; F3213; F3215; F3216	2016–05	Xperia XA Ultra	6.0, 7.0	MediaTek MT6755, octa-core 64 bits (4 × 2.0 GHz, 4 × 1.0 GHz)	3 GB	16 GB	6.0 Full HD 1080p	202 g	2700	4.1	802.11a/b/g/n, dual-band	Yes	Rear: 21.5 MP; Front: 16 MP	GSM, HSPA+, LTE
F3311; F3313	2016–05	Xperia E5	6.0	MediaTek MT6735, quad-core 64 bits (4 × 1.3 GHz)	1.5 GB	16 GB	5.0 HD 720p	147 g	2300	4.1	802.11a/b/g/n, dual-band, MIMO	Yes	Rear: 13 MP; Front: 5 MP	GSM, HSPA+, LTE
F8331; F8332 SO-01J SOV34	2016–09	Xperia XZ	6.0.1, 7.0, 7.1.1, 8.0	Snapdragon 820, quad-core 64 bits (2 × 2.15 GHz, 2 × 1.6 GHz)	3 GB	32 GB (Single SIM); 64 GB (Dual SIM)	5.2 Full HD 1080p	161 g	2900	4.2	802.11a/b/g/n/ac, dual-band, MIMO	Yes	Rear: 23 MP; Front: 13 MP	GSM, HSPA+, LTE
F5321 SO-02J	2016–09	Xperia X Compact	6.0.1, 7.0, 7.1.1, 8.0	Snapdragon 650, hexa-core (2 × 1.8 GHz, 4 × 1.8 GHz)	3 GB	32 GB	4.6 HD 720p	135 g	2700	4.2	802.11a/b/g/n/ac, dual-band, MIMO	Yes	Rear: 23 MP; Front: 5 MP	GSM, HSPA+, LTE
G8231; G8232; SOV35	2017–02	Xperia XZs	7.1, 8.0	Snapdragon 820, quad-core 64 bits (2 × 2.15 GHz, 2 × 1.6 GHz)	4 GB	32 GB (Single SIM); 64 GB (Dual SIM)	5.2 Full HD 1080p	161 g	2900	4.2	802.11a/b/g/n/ac, dual-band, MIMO	Yes	Rear: 19 MP; Front: 13 MP	GSM, HSPA+, LTE
G8141; G8142 SO-04J	2017–02	Xperia XZ Premium	7.1, 8.0, 9	Snapdragon 835, octa-core (4 × 2.45 GHz, 4 × 1.9 GHz)	4 GB	64 GB	5.5 4K HDR	195 g	3230	5	802.11a/b/g/n/ac, dual-band, MIMO	Yes	Rear: 19 MP; Front: 13 MP	GSM, HSPA+, LTE
G3121; G3123; G3125	2017–02	Xperia XA1	7.0, 8.0	MediaTek MT6757, octa-core 64 bits (4 × 2.3 GHz, 4 × 1.6 GHz)	3 GB	32 GB	5.0 HD 720p	143 g	2300	4.2	802.11a/b/g/n, dual-band	Yes	Rear: 23 MP; Front: 8 MP	GSM, HSPA+, LTE
G3212; G3221; G3223; G3226	2017–02	Xperia XA1 Ultra	7.0, 8.0	MediaTek MT6757, octa-core 64 bits (4 × 2.3 GHz, 4 × 1.6 GHz)	4 GB	32 GB (G3212, G3221, G3223); 64 GB (G3226)	6.0 Full HD 1080p	188 g	2700	4.2	802.11a/b/g/n, dual-band	Yes	Rear: 23 MP; Front: 16 MP	GSM, HSPA+, LTE
G3311; G3313	2017–03	Xperia L1	7.0	MediaTek MT6737T, quad-core 64 bits (4 × 1.5 GHz)	2 GB	16 GB	5.5 HD 720p	180 g	2620	4.2	802.11a/b/g/n	Yes	Rear: 13 MP; Front: 5 MP	GSM, HSPA+, LTE
G8341; G8342 SO-01K SOV36 701SO	2017–08	Xperia XZ1	8.0, 9	Snapdragon 835, octa-core (4 × 2.35 GHz, 4 × 1.9 GHz)	4 GB	64 GB	5.2 FHD 1080p	156 g	2700	5	802.11a/b/g/n/ac, dual-band, MIMO	Yes	Rear: 19 MP; Front: 13 MP	GSM, HSPA+, LTE
G8441 SO-02K	2017–08	Xperia XZ1 Compact	8.0, 9	Snapdragon 835, octa-core (4 × 2.35 GHz, 4 × 1.9 GHz)	4 GB	32 GB	4.6 HD 720p	143 g	2700	5	802.11a/b/g/n/ac, dual-band, MIMO	Yes	Rear: 19 MP; Front: 8 MP	GSM, HSPA+, LTE
G3412; G3416; G3421; G3423; G3426	2017–08	Xperia XA1 Plus	7.0, 8.0	MediaTek MT6757, octa-core 64 bits (4 × 2.3 GHz, 4 × 1.6 GHz)	3/4 GB	32 GB	5.5 Full HD 1080p	189 g	3430	4.2	802.11a/b/g/n, dual-band	Yes	Rear: 23 MP; Front: 8 MP	GSM, HSPA+, LTE
G2199	2017–10	Xperia R1	7.1.2	Snapdragon 430, octa-core 64 bits (8 × 1.4 GHz)	2 GB	16 GB	5.2 HD 720p	154 g	2620	4.2	802.11b/g/n	No	Rear: 13 MP; Front: 8 MP	GSM, HSPA+, LTE
G2299	2017–10	Xperia R1 Plus	7.1.2	Snapdragon 430, octa-core 64 bits (8 × 1.4 GHz)	3 GB	32 GB	5.2 HD 720p	154 g	2620	4.2	802.11b/g/n	No	Rear: 13 MP; Front: 8 MP	GSM, HSPA+, LTE
H3311; H3321; H4311; H4331	2018-01	Xperia L2	7.1.1	MediaTek MT6737T, quad-core 64 bits (4 × 1.5 GHz)	3 GB	32 GB	5.5 HD 720p	178 g	3300	4.2	802.11a/b/g/n	Yes	Rear: 13 MP; Front: 8 MP	GSM, HSPA+, LTE
H3113; H4113	2018-01	Xperia XA2	8.0, 9	Snapdragon 630, octa-core (2.2 GHz + 1.8 GHz Cortex-A53)	3 GB	32 GB	5.2 Full HD 1080p	171 g	3300	5	802.11a/b/g/n	Yes	Rear: 23 MP; Front: 8 MP	GSM, HSPA+, LTE
H3213; H4213	2018-01	Xperia XA2 Ultra	8.0, 9	Snapdragon 630, octa-core (2.2 GHz + 1.8 GHz Cortex-A53)	4 GB	32/64 GB	6.0 Full HD 1080p	221 g	3580	5	802.11a/b/g/n	Yes	Rear: 23 MP; Front: 16 MP + 8 MP	GSM, HSPA+, LTE
H8216; H8266; H8276; H8296; SO-03K; SOV37; 702SO	2018-02	Xperia XZ2	8.0, 9, 10	Snapdragon 845, octa-core (4 ×2.8 GHz + 4 ×1.8 GHz)	4/6 GB	64 GB	5.7 Full HD+ 1080p	198 g	3180	5	802.11a/b/g/n/ac, dual-band, MIMO	Yes	Rear: 19 MP; Front: 5 MP	GSM, HSPA+, LTE
H8314; H8324; SO-05K	2018-02	Xperia XZ2 Compact	8.0, 9, 10.0	Snapdragon 845, octa-core (4 ×2.8 GHz + 4 ×1.8 GHz)	4 GB	64 GB	5.0 Full HD+ 1080p	168 g	2870	5	802.11a/b/g/n/ac, dual-band, MIMO	Yes	Rear: 19 MP; Front: 5 MP	GSM, HSPA+, LTE
H8116; H8166; SO-04K; SOV38	2018-04	Xperia XZ2 Premium	8.0, 9.0, 10.0	Snapdragon 845, octa-core (4 ×2.8 GHz + 4 ×1.8 GHz)	6 GB	64 GB	5.8 4K HDR	236 g	3540	5	802.11a/b/g/n/ac, dual-band, MIMO	Yes	Rear: 19 MP + 12 MP; Front: 13 MP	GSM, HSPA+, LTE
H3413; H4413; H4493	2018-07	Xperia XA2 Plus	8.0, 9.0	Snapdragon 630, octa-core (2.2 GHz + 1.8 GHz Cortex-A53)	4/6 GB	32/64 GB	6.0 Full HD+ 1080p	204 g	3580	5	802.11a/b/g/n	Yes	Rear: 23 MP; Front: 8 MP	GSM, HSPA+, LTE
H8416; H9436; H9493; SO-01L; SOV39; 801SO	2018-08	Xperia XZ3	9.0, 10.0	Snapdragon 845, octa-core (4 ×2.8 GHz + 4 ×1.8 GHz)	4/6 GB	64 GB	6.0 QHD+ P-OLED	193 g	3330	5	802.11a/b/g/n/ac, dual-band, MIMO	Yes	Rear: 19 MP; Front: 13 MP	GSM, HSPA+, LTE
I3312; I4312; I4332	2019-02	Xperia L3	8.0	MediaTek Helio P22, octa-core (2.0 GHz Cortex-A53)	3 GB	32 GB	5.7 HD 720p IPS LCD	156 g	3300	5	802.11a/b/g/n, dual-band	Yes	Rear: 13 MP + 2 MP; Front: 8 MP	GSM, HSPA+, LTE
I3113; I3123; I4113; I4193	2019-02	Xperia 10	9.0	Snapdragon 630, octa-core (2.2 GHz Cortex-A53)	3 GB; 4 GB (China only)	64 GB	6.0 Full HD+ 1080p IPS LCD	162 g	2870	5	802.11a/b/g/n/ac, dual-band	Yes	Rear: 13 MP + 5 MP; Front: 8 MP	GSM, HSPA+, LTE
I3213; I3223; I4213; I4293	2019-02	Xperia 10 Plus	9.0	Snapdragon 636, octa-core (1.8 GHz Kryo 260)	4 GB; 6 GB (China only)	64 GB	6.5 Full HD+ 1080p IPS LCD	180 g	3000	5	802.11a/b/g/n/ac, dual-band	Yes	Rear: 12 MP + 8 MP; Front: 8 MP	GSM, HSPA+, LTE
J8110; J8170; J9110; SO-03L; SOV40; 802SO; J9150	2019-05	Xperia 1 Xperia 1 Professional Edition	9.0, 10.0, 11	Snapdragon 855, octa-core (1 ×2.84 GHz + 3 ×2.42 GHz + 4 ×1.8 GHz Kryo 485)	6 GB	64/128 GB	6.5 CinemaWide™ 4K HDR OLED	178 g	3330	5	802.11 a/b/g/n/ac, dual-band, MIMO	Yes	Rear: 12 MP + 12 MP + 12 MP; Front: 8 MP	GSM, HSPA+, LTE
J3173; SO-02L	2019-06	Xperia Ace	9.0, 10.0	Snapdragon 630, octa-core (2.2 GHz Cortex-A53)	4 GB	64 GB	5.0 Full HD+ IPS LCD	154 g	2700	5	802.11a/b/g/n/ac, dual-band	Yes	Rear: 12 MP; Front: 8 MP	GSM, HSPA+, LTE
J8210; J8270; J9210; J9260; SO-01M; SOV41; 901SO	2019-09	Xperia 5	9.0, 10.0, 11.0	Snapdragon 855, octa-core (1 ×2.84 GHz + 3 ×2.42 GHz + 4 ×1.8 GHz Kryo 485)	6 GB	64/128 GB	6.1 Full HD+ 1080p HDR OLED	164 g	3140	5	802.11 a/b/g/n/ac, dual-band, MIMO	Yes	Rear: 12 MP + 12 MP + 12 MP; Front: 8 MP	GSM, HSPA+, LTE
SOV42; 902SO; J3273	2019-10	Xperia 8 Xperia 8 Lite	9.0, 10.0	Snapdragon 630, octa-core (2.2 GHz Cortex-A53)	4 GB	64 GB	6.0 Full HD+ 1080p IPS LCD	170 g	2760 (8); 2870 (8 Lite)	5	802.11a/b/g/n/ac, dual-band	Yes	Rear: 12 MP + 8 MP; Front: 8 MP	GSM, HSPA+, LTE
XQ-AD51; XQ-AD52	2020-02	Xperia L4	9.0	MediaTek Helio P22, octa-core (2.0 GHz Cortex-A53)	3 GB	64 GB	6.2 HD 720p IPS LCD	178 g	3580	5	802.11a/b/g/n, dual-band	Yes	Rear: 13 MP + 5 MP + 2 MP; Front: 8 MP	GSM, HSPA+, LTE
XQ-AT42; XQ-AT51; XQ-AT52; XQ-AT72; SO-51A; SOG01	2020-02	Xperia 1 II	10, 11, 12	Snapdragon 865	8/12 GB	128/256 GB	6.5 CinemaWide™ 4K HDR OLED	181 g	4000	5.1	802.11a/b/g/n/ac/ax, dual-band, MIMO 2x2	Yes	Rear: 12 MP + 12 MP + 12 MP + 3D iToF; Front: 8 MP	GSM, HSPA+, LTE, 5G sub-6
XQ-AU42; XQ-AU51; XQ-AU52; SO-41A; SOV43; A001SO	2020-02	Xperia 10 II	10, 11, 12	Snapdragon 665	4 GB	64/128 GB	6.0 Full HD+ OLED	151 g	3600	5.0	802.11a/b/g/n/ac, dual-band	Yes	Rear: 12 MP + 8 MP + 8 MP; Front: 8 MP	GSM, HSPA+, LTE
XQ-AS42; XQ-AS52; XQ-AS62; XQ-AS72; SO-52A; SOG02; A002SO	2020-10	Xperia 5 II	10, 11, 12	Snapdragon 865	8 GB	128/256 GB	6.1 Full HD+ 120Hz OLED	163 g	4000	5.0	802.11a/b/g/n/ac/ax, dual-band, MIMO	Yes	Rear: 12 MP + 12 MP + 12 MP; Front: 8 MP	GSM, HSPA+, LTE, 5G sub-6
XQ-AQ52; XQ-AQ62	2021-01	Xperia PRO	10.11,12	Snapdragon 865	12 GB	512 GB	6.5 CinemaWide™ 4K HDR OLED	225.1 g	4000	5.1	802.11a/b/g/n/ac/ax, dual-band, MIMO 2x2	Yes	Rear: 12 MP + 12 MP + 12 MP + 3D iToF; Front: 8 MP	GSM, HSPA+, LTE, 5G sub-6, 5G mmWave
XQ-BT52; SO-52B; SOG04; A102SO; XQ-BT44	2021-04	Xperia 10 III; Xperia 10 III Lite	11, 12, 13	Snapdragon 690	6 GB	64 GB (10 III Lite); 128 GB (10 III)	6.0 Full HD+ HDR OLED	169 g	4500	5.1	802.11a/b/g/n/ac, dual-band, MIMO 2x2	Yes	Rear: 12 MP + 8 MP + 8 MP; Front: 8 MP	GSM, HSPA+, LTE, 5G sub-6
XQ-BQ42; XQ-BQ52; XQ-BQ62; XQ-BQ72; SO-53B; SOG05; A103SO	2021-04	Xperia 5 III	11,12,13	Snapdragon 888	8 GB	128/256 GB	6.1 Full HD+ HDR 120Hz OLED	169 g	4500	5.2	802.11a/b/g/n/ac/ax, dual-band, MIMO 2x2	Yes	Rear: 12 MP + 12 MP + 12 MP; Front: 8 MP	GSM, HSPA+, LTE, 5G sub-6
XQ-BC42; XQ-BC52; XQ-BC62; XQ-BC72; SO-51B; SOG03; A101SO	2021-04	Xperia 1 III	11,12,13	Snapdragon 888	12 GB	256/512 GB	6.5 CinemaWide™ 4K HDR 120Hz OLED	187 g	4500	5.2	802.11a/b/g/n/ac/ax, dual-band, MIMO 2x2	Yes	Rear: 12 MP + 12 MP + 12 MP + 3D iToF; Front: 8 MP	GSM, HSPA+, LTE, 5G sub-6, 5G mmWave
SO-41B	2021-05	Xperia Ace II	11,12,13	MediaTek Helio P35	4 GB	64 GB	5.5 HD+ IPS LCD	159 g	4500	5.0	802.11a/b/g/n/ac, dual-band	Yes	Rear: 13 MP + depth sensor Front: 8 MP	GSM, HSPA+, LTE
XQ-BE52; XQ-BE62; XQ-BE72	2021-10	Xperia PRO-I	11,12,13	Snapdragon 888	12 GB	512 GB	6.5 CinemaWide™ 4K HDR 120Hz OLED	221 g	4500	5.2	802.11a/b/g/n/ac/ax, dual-band, MIMO 2x2	Yes	Rear: 12 MP (F2.0/F4.0 1.0-type Exmor RS) + 12 MP + 12 MP + 3D iToF; Front: 8 MP	GSM, HSPA+, LTE, 5G sub-6
XQ-CC54; SO-52C; SOG07; A202SO	2022-06	Xperia 10 IV	12,13,14	Snapdragon 695	6 GB	128 GB	6.0 Full HD+ HDR OLED	161 g	5000	5.1	802.11a/b/g/n/ac, dual-band, MIMO 2x2	Yes	Rear: 12 MP + 8 MP + 8 MP; Front: 8 MP	GSM, HSPA+, LTE, 5G sub-6
XQ-CT54; XQ-CT62; XQ-CT72; SO-51C; SOG06; A201SO	2022-06	Xperia 1 IV	12,13,14	Snapdragon 8 Gen 1	12 GB	256/512 GB	6.5 CinemaWide™ 4K HDR 120Hz OLED	185 g	5000	5.2	802.11a/b/g/n/ac/ax, dual-band, MIMO 2x2	Yes	Rear: 12 MP + 12 MP + 12 MP + 3D iToF; Front: 12 MP	GSM, HSPA+, LTE, 5G sub-6, 5G mmWave
SO-53C; SOG08; A203SO	2022-06	Xperia Ace III	12,13,14	Snapdragon 480	4 GB	64 GB	5.5 HD+ IPS LCD	162 g	4500	5.1	802.11a/b/g/n/ac, dual-band	Yes	Rear: 13 MP; Front: 5 MP	GSM, HSPA+, LTE, 5G sub-6
XQ-CQ54; XQ-CQ52; XQ-CQ72	2022-09	Xperia 5 IV	12,13,14	Snapdragon 8 Gen 1	8 GB	128/256 GB	6.1 Full HD+ HDR 120Hz OLED	172 g	5000	5.2	802.11a/b/g/n/ac/ax, dual-band, MIMO 2x2	Yes	Rear: 12 MP + 12 MP + 12 MP; Front: 12 MP	GSM, HSPA+, LTE, 5G sub-6
XQ-DC54; SO-52D; SOG11	2023-06	Xperia 10 V	13,14,15	Snapdragon 695	6/8 GB	128 GB	6.1 Full HD+ HDR OLED	159 g	5000	5.1	802.11a/b/g/n/ac, dual-band, MIMO 2x2	Yes	Rear: 48 MP + 8 MP + 8 MP; Front: 8 MP	GSM, HSPA+, LTE, 5G sub-6
XQ-DQ54; XQ-DQ62; XQ-DQ72; SO-51D; SOG10	2023-06	Xperia 1 V	13,14,15	Snapdragon 8 Gen 2	12 GB	256/512 GB	6.5 CinemaWide™ 4K HDR 120Hz OLED	187 g	5000	5.3	802.11a/b/g/n/ac/6e, dual-band, MIMO 2x2	Yes	Rear: 48 MP + 12 MP + 12 MP; Front: 12 MP	GSM, HSPA+, LTE, 5G sub-6, 5G mmWave
XQ-DE54; XQ-DE72	2023-09	Xperia 5 V	13,14,15	Snapdragon 8 Gen 2	8 GB	128/256 GB	6.1 Full HD+ HDR 120Hz OLED	182 g	5000	5.3	802.11a/b/g/n/ac/6e, dual-band, MIMO 2x2	Yes	Rear: 48 MP + 12 MP; Front: 12 MP	GSM, HSPA+, LTE, 5G sub-6
XQ-ES54; XQ-ES72	2024-06	Xperia 10 VI	14,15,16	Snapdragon 6 Gen 1	8 GB	128 GB	6.1 Full HD+ HDR OLED	164 g	5000	5.2	802.11a/b/g/n/ac, dual-band, MIMO 2x2	Yes	Rear: 48 MP + 8 MP; Front: 8 MP	GSM, HSPA+, LTE, 5G sub-6
XQ-EC54; XQ-EC72	2024-06	Xperia 1 VI	14,15,16	Snapdragon 8 Gen 3	12 GB	256/512 GB	6.5 LTPO Full HD+ HDR 120Hz OLED	192 g	5000	5.4	802.11a/b/g/n/ac/ax/be, triple-band, MIMO 2x2	Yes	Rear: 48 MP + 12 MP + 12 MP; Front: 12 MP	GSM, HSPA+, LTE, 5G sub-6
XQ-FS54; XQ-FS72	2025-06	Xperia 1 VII	15,16	Snapdragon 8 Elite	12 GB	256/512 GB	6.5 LTPO Full HD+ HDR 120Hz OLED	197 g	5000	6.0	802.11a/b/g/n/ac/ax/be, triple-band, MIMO 2x2	Yes	Rear: 48 MP + 12 MP + 48 MP; Front: 12 MP	GSM, HSPA+, LTE, 5G sub-6
XQ-FE54; XQ-FE72	2025-09	Xperia 10 VII	15,16	Snapdragon 6 Gen 3	8 GB	128 GB	6.1 Full HD+ HDR 120Hz OLED	168 g	5000	5.4	802.11a/b/g/n/ac/ax, triple-band, MIMO 2x2	Yes	Rear: 50 MP + 13 MP; Front: 8 MP	GSM, HSPA+, LTE, 5G sub-6
XQ-GE54; XQ-GE74	2026-06	Xperia 1 VIII	16, 17	Snapdragon 8 Elite Gen 5	12GB/16GB	256/512/1024GB	6.5 LTPO Full HD+ HDR 120Hz OLED	200 g	5000	6.0	802.11a/b/g/n/ac/ax/be, triple-band, MIMO 2x2	Yes	Rear: 48 MP + 48 MP + 48 MP; Front: 12 MP	GSM, HSPA+, LTE, 5G sub-6, 5G mmWave
XQ-GH54 XQ-GH74	2026-09	Xperia 10 VIII	16	Snapdragon 6 Gen 3	8 GB	128 GB	6.1 Full HD+ HDR 120Hz OLED	168 g	5000	5.4	802.11a/b/g/n/ac/ax, triple-band, MIMO 2x2	Yes	Rear: 50 MP + 13 MP; Front: 8 MP	GSM, HSPA+, LTE, 5G sub-6

== Sony Xperia tablets ==
Code name	Market name	Release date	Android version	System on chip	RAM	ROM	Display	Weight	Battery (mAh)	Bluetooth	Wi-Fi	Camera
Tsx03	Xperia Tablet S	2012–09	4.0	1.3 GHz Nvidia Tegra 3 T30L, quad-core	1 GB	16/32/64 GB	9.4 WXGA	570 g	6000	3.0	802.11a/b/g/n	Rear: 8 MP; Front: 1 MP
Pollux	Xperia Tablet Z	2013–03	4.1.2, 4.2.2, 4.3, 4.4.2, 4.4.4, 5.0.2, 5.1.1	1.5 GHz Qualcomm Snapdragon S4 Pro APQ8064, quad-core	2 GB	16/32 GB	10.1 WUXGA	495 g	6000	4.0	802.11b/g/n, dual-band	Rear: 8.1 MP; Front: 2.2 MP
Castor/PF5	Xperia Z2 Tablet	2014–03	4.4.2, 4.4.4, 5.0.2, 5.1.1, 6.0.1	2.3 GHz Qualcomm Snapdragon 801 MSM8974AB, quad-core	3 GB	16/32 GB	10.1 WUXGA	426 g	6000	4.0	802.11b/g/n, dual-band	Rear: 8.1 MP; Front: 2.2 MP
Scorpion	Xperia Z3 Tablet Compact	2014–10	4.4.4, 5.0.2, 5.1.1, 6.0.1	2.5 GHz Qualcomm Snapdragon 801 MSM8974AC, quad-core	3 GB	16/32 GB	8 TFT LCD	270 g	4500	4.0	802.11a/b/g/n/ac, dual-band	Rear: 8.1 MP; Front: 2.2 MP
Karin/T2II	Xperia Z4 Tablet	2015–06	5.0.2, 6.0, 6.0.1, 7.0	2 GHz Qualcomm Snapdragon 810, 64-bit octa-core	3 GB	32 GB	10.1 TFT LCD	389 g	6000	4.1	802.11a/b/g/n/ac, dual-band	Rear: 8.1 MP; Front: 5.1 MP

== Sony Xperia smartwatches ==
Code name	Model	Market name	Platform	Release date	Android version	System on chip	RAM	ROM	Display	Weight	Battery (mAh)	Bluetooth	Wi-Fi	NFC
Brooks	SWR50	Xperia Smartwatch 3	Bcm23550	2014–10	4.4W.1, 4.4W.2, 5.0.1, 5.1.1, 6.0.1	Broadcom BCM23550, quad-core 32 bits (4 × 1.2 GHz)	512 MB	4 GB	1.6 TFT LCD; 320x320	76g (38g body)	420	4.0	802.11b/g	Yes

== Sony Xperia projectors ==
Code name	Model	Market name	Platform	Release date	Android version	System on chip	RAM	ROM	Display	Weight	Battery (mAh)	Bluetooth	Wi-Fi	NFC	Camera
Blanc	G1109	Xperia Touch	Loire Smart (BlancBright)	2017–02	7.0, 8.0	Qualcomm APQ8056, hexa-core 64 bits (2 × 1.8 GHz, 4 × 1.4 GHz)	3 GB	32 GB	SXRD LCD; WXGA	932 g	1200	4.2	802.11a/b/g/n/ac	Yes	Front: 13 MP

== Sony Xperia robotic assistants ==
Code name	Model	Market name	Platform	Release date	Android version	System on chip	RAM	ROM	Display	Weight	Battery (mAh)	Bluetooth	Wi-Fi	NFC	Camera
Bright	G1209	Xperia Hello!/Xperia Agent/Xperia Agent Concept	Loire Smart (BlancBright)	2017–10	7.1	Qualcomm APQ8056, hexa-core 64 bits (2 × 1.8 GHz, 4 × 1.4 GHz)	3 GB	32 GB	4.55 LCD; 720p	1085 g	2300	4.2	802.11a/b/g/n/ac	Yes	Front: 13 MP

== See also ==
- Sony Xperia Z series
