= Sony Xperia 1 Series =

Line of Android smartphones

- Sony Xperia 1 logo without the Sony logo, used continuously since 2019

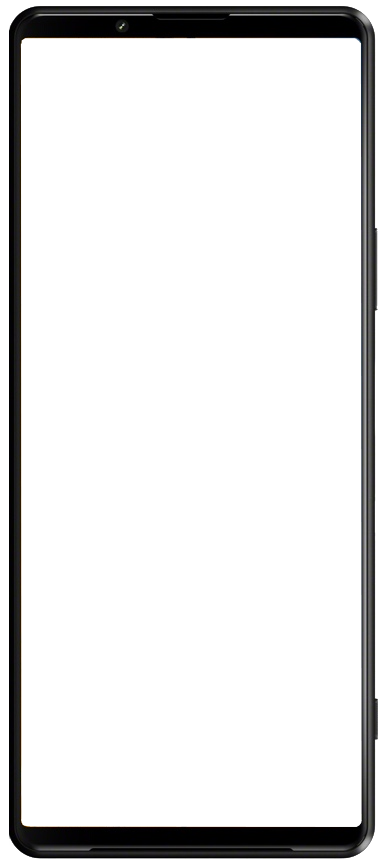
- Sony Xperia 1 III (2021) in Frosted Black colorway
- Codename: Xperia 1: Griffin (PF13) Xperia 1 II: PDX-203; Xperia 1 III: PDX-215; Xperia 1 IV: PDX-223; Xperia 1 V: PDX-234; Xperia 1 VI: PDX-245; Xperia 1 VII: PDX-255 Xperia 1 VIII: PDX-267
- Developer: Sony
- Manufacturer: Sony Electronics; Sony Mobile
- Product family: Sony Xperia
- Type: Smartphones
- Generation: 8
- Released: February 25, 2019; 7 years ago
- Lifespan: 2019-present
- Introductory price: ~ 950 USD - 1600 USD
- Media: Sony Music, Game Enhancer, Video Creator App, Sony Pictures Core (Sony Xperia 1 IV and up)
- Operating system: Android
- System on a chip: Global: Qualcomm Snapdragon (2019−present)
- CPU: Sony Xperia 1: Snapdragon 855; Sony Xperia 1 II: Snapdragon 865 5G; Sony Xperia 1 III: Snapdragon 888 5G; Sony Xperia 1 IV: Snapdragon 8 Gen 1 Sony Xperia 1 V: Snapdragon 8 Gen 2 Sony Xperia 1 VI: Snapdragon 8 Gen 3 Sony Xperia 1 VII: Snapdragon 8 Elite; Sony Xperia 1 VIII: Snapdragon 8 Elite Gen 5
- Memory: Sony Xperia 1: 6 GB; Sony Xperia 1 II: 8-12 GB; Sony Xperia 1 III—present: 12-16 GB (LPDDR; Sony Xperia 1: LPDDR4X; Sony Xperia 1 II - 1 IV: LPDDR5; Sony Xperia 1 V - 1 VIII: LPDDR5X)
- Storage: Universal Flash Storage (UFS); Xperia 1: UFS 2.1; Xperia 1 II: UFS 3.0; Xperia 1 III, IV: UFS 3.1; Xperia 1 V, VI, VII: UFS 4.0; Xperia 1 VIII: UFS 4.1
- Removable storage: MicroSD card slot support Xperia 1: up to 512 GB; Xperia 1 II - V: 1 TB; Xperia 1 VI: 1.5 TB; Xperia 1 VII - VIII: 2 TB
- Display: 21:9 CinemaWide 4K HDR BT.2020 OLED (2019-2023) (with 120Hz HRR since 1 III); 19.5:9 LTPO FHD+ 120Hz HDR BT.2020 OLED (2024-present)
- Graphics: Adreno GPU
- Sound: Stereo Speakers; Xperia 1: Hybrid stereo speakers Xperia 1 II: Front-firing stereo speakers Xperia 1 III - present: Full-stage front-firing stereo speakers
- Input: Touchscreen; Sony Alpha camera support
- Controller input: DualShock; DualSense
- Camera: Main + Telephoto + Ultrawide + 3D iToF (only Xperia 1 II to 1 IV) + Selfie Xperia 1: 12 MP Sony Exmor IMX445 26 mm OIS + 12 MP ISOCELL S5K3M3 52 mm OIS + 12 MP ISOCELL S5K3M3 16 mm + 8 MP Samsung ISOCELL S5K4H7; Xperia 1 II: 12 MP Exmor IMX557 24 mm OIS + 12 MP ISOCELL S5K3T2 70 mm OIS + 12 MP Exmor IMX363 16 mm Dual Pixel PDAF + 0.3 MP Exmor IMX316 3D iTOF + 8 MP Samsung ISOCELL S5K4H7; Xperia 1 III: 12 MP Exmor IMX557 24 mm OIS + 12 MP Exmor IMX663 70 mm, 105 mm variable periscope telephoto OIS + 12 MP Exmor IMX363 16 mm Dual Pixel PDAF + 0.3 MP Exmor IMX316 3D iTOF + 8 MP Samsung ISOCELL S5K4H7; Xperia 1 IV: 12 MP Exmor IMX557 24 mm OIS + 12 MP Exmor IMX650 85-125 mm continuous optical zoom periscope telephoto OIS + 12 MP Exmor IMX563 16 mm Dual Pixel PDAF + 0.3 MP Exmor IMX316 3D iTOF + 12 MP Exmor IMX663; Xperia 1 V: 48 MP LYT-800/IMX888 24 mm OIS + 12 MP Exmor IMX650 85-125 mm continuous optical zoom periscope telephoto OIS + 12 MP Exmor IMX563 16 mm Dual Pixel PDAF + 12 MP Exmor IMX663; Xperia 1 VI: 48 MP LYT-800/IMX888 24 mm OIS + 12 MP Exmor IMX650 85-170 mm continuous optical zoom periscope telephoto OIS + 12 MP Exmor IMX563 16 mm Dual Pixel PDAF + 12 MP Exmor IMX663; Xperia 1 VII: 48 MP LYT-800/IMX888 24 mm OIS + 12 MP Exmor IMX650 85-170mm continuous optical zoom periscope telephoto OIS + 48 MP Exmor IMX906 16 mm PDAF + 12 MP Exmor IMX663; Xperia 1 VIII: 48 MP LYT-800/IMX888 24 mm OIS + 48 MP Exmor IMX906 70 mm (140 mm hybrid zoom) periscope telephoto OIS + 48 MP Exmor IMX906 16 mm PDAF + 12 MP Exmor IMX663
- Connectivity: 2G; 3G; 4G; 5G (Xperia 1 II and up); Bluetooth 5.0-6.0; Wi-Fi 802.11 a/b/g/n/ac - a/b/g/n/ac/ax/be (2.4/5GHz); NFC; USB-C 3.1/3.2 Gen 1 (supports DisplayPort); GPS with Assisted GPS; Galileo; GLONASS; BeiDou
- Weight: 178 g (6.3 oz) - 200 g (7.1 oz)
- Model Number: J8XXX, J9XXX, XQ-xx4x/5x/7x
- Predecessor: Sony Xperia Z series (2013-2015); Sony Xperia XZ series (2016-2018); Sony Xperia 5 Series (2019-2023; indirect, flagship spec-wise)
- Related: Sony Xperia 5 Series; Sony Xperia 10 series
- Made in: Sony Xperia 1 - Sony Xperia 1 VI: Thailand; Sony Xperia 1 VII - present : China
- Website: https://www.sony.co.uk/smartphones/gallery

Sony Xperia 1 logo

The Sony Xperia 1 series is the current line of flagship Android smartphones in the Sony Xperia series manufactured by Sony Mobile since 2019. It succeeded both the Xperia Z and Xperia XZ series, especially the Z5 Premium and XZ Premium series. Unlike in the Xperia Z and XZ naming scheme, the Sony Xperia 1 series (and subsequently the other numeral Xperia series introduced in 2019) borrowed its nomenclature from its Sony Alpha camera division, where every succession of Xperia numeral series is stated with "Mark" (e.g., Xperia 1 II, spelled as Sony Xperia 1 Mark 2), and released annually instead of their predecessor biennially. The current iteration of the Xperia 1 series is the Sony Xperia 1 VIII. The Xperia 1 series indirectly succeeded the now-defunct Xperia 5 series in terms of flagship specs.

== Models ==
=== Smartphones ===
==== Sony Xperia 1 (2019) ====
At MWC 2019, Sony unveiled the original Xperia 1, replacing both XZ3 and XZ2 Premium simultaneously. It is equipped with a 6.5-inch, premiering the world's first 4K HDR BT.2020 OLED in a smartphone with a 21:9 CinemaWide aspect ratio, Qualcomm Snapdragon 855 (TSMC-made 7 nm) with 6 GB LPDDR4X RAM and 64 GB or 128 GB UFS 2.1 of expandable storage (up to 512 GB), and IP65/68 water and dust resistance. It is also the first Sony Xperia with a triple camera setup and the first Sony Xperia with OIS. It has a split power button and fingerprint sensor. It is equipped with Sony Alpha's signature feature of Eye Autofocus (AF) and pre-installed with Sony CineAlta-developed Cinema Pro. The Sony Xperia 1 is equipped with both front and back with Gorilla Glass 6, with an aluminum alloy frame on its side. It emphasizes multitasking and multimedia consumption. It was announced alongside the original Sony Xperia 10, 10 Plus, and Sony Xperia L3. It is the only Xperia 1 to ever be unveiled at the MWC event. The original Xperia 1 is also the final Xperia to have the 960 fps Motion-Eye super slow motion feature that was first seen in the Xperia XZ Premium/XZs, and the only Xperia 1 not to feature a 3.5 mm headphone jack, as its subsequent successors returned the feature the following year, first since the Xperia XZ1 series. The original Xperia 1 was preinstalled with Android 9 Pie.

==== Sony Xperia 1 II (2020) ====
Due to the COVID-19 pandemic precaution, Sony pulled out its MWC 2020 attendance, where the MWC 2020 was eventually cancelled, and instead unveiled the Xperia 1 II alongside the Sony Xperia 10 II and Sony Xperia PRO (2020) online via Sony Xperia's YouTube channel. It succeeded the original Xperia 1; it is equipped with a 6.5-inch 4K HDR BT.2020 OLED at 21:9 CinemaWide aspect ratio with motion blur reduction to mimic 90 Hz, with Qualcomm Snapdragon 865 (TSMC-made 7 nm+) with 5G support, 8 GB or 12 GB of LPDDR5 RAM, coupled with 128 GB or 256 GB of UFS 3.0 of expandable storage (up to 1 TB), and IP65/68 water and dust resistance. Alongside the usual versatile (ultrawide, main, and telephoto lens) yet upgraded triple rear camera setup, the rear camera gained a 3D indirect TOF camera (IMX316) to help subject focus regardless of its position. The Eye Autofocus from its Alpha division was carried over, now supporting Animal Eye Autofocus and faster 20 fps AF/AE, akin to the Sony Alpha 9 mirrorless camera, and pre-installed with a new Photography Pro app, where its application mimicked the Sony Alpha camera interface but with touch support for smartphone usage. The Sony Xperia 1 II design changed from its curved-frame and curved-glass predecessor to a chamfered, flat frame and flat glass back of Gorilla Glass 6. The fingerprint sensor and power button have been combined into one, akin to what is seen in the Sony Xperia XZ Premium and Sony Xperia Z5 Premium. The Sony Xperia 1 II marked the return of both the 3.5 mm headphone jack and the combined power button and fingerprint sensor from the Sony Xperia XZ1 and the wireless charging feature from the Sony Xperia XZ3.

==== Sony Xperia 1 III (2021) ====
Alongside the Sony Xperia 5 III and Xperia 10 III, the Xperia 1 III was announced on 14 April 2021 online via Sony Xperia's YouTube channel as the COVID-19 pandemic situation was still ongoing. It is equipped with a Qualcomm Snapdragon 888 (Samsung-made 5 nm), IP65/68 water- and dust-resistant, 12 GB or 16 GB LPDDR5 RAM, and 256 GB or 512 GB UFS 3.1 base storage with support of expandable storage up to 1 TB. It is the world's first 4K HDR BT.2020 OLED 120 Hz high refresh rate on a smartphone, protected with Gorilla Glass Victus. It retained the 21:9 CinemaWide aspect ratio introduced on its predecessor. Alongside the Xperia 5 III, the 1 III is equipped with a two-variable periscope telephoto lens, where it can move either a 70 mm (2.9x) or 105 mm (4.4x) focal length from its 1/2.9" IMX663 sensor It is the only time when the Xperia 1, Xperia 5, and Xperia 10 were announced at the same time. The Xperia 1 III introduced a new shutter button design and texture to mimic their flagship Sony Alpha camera. The rear glass of the Sony Xperia 1 III is frosted and matte Gorilla Glass 6 instead of the glossy back of its subsequent predecessor (with the exception of 1 II's frosted black colorway.)

==== Sony Xperia 1 IV (2022) ====
Announced with the Xperia 10 IV, the Xperia 1 IV was announced on 11 May 2022, via the online YouTube channel of the Sony Xperia, a tradition set by the Xperia 1 II in 2020. It is equipped with a Qualcomm Snapdragon 8 Gen 1 (Samsung-made 4 nm), IP 65/68 water-and-dust-resistant, 12 GB or 16 GB of LPDDR5 RAM, and 256 or 512 GB of UFS 3.1 of expandable storage, up to 1 TB capacity. Its screen is a 4K HDR BT.2020 OLED with 120 Hz support of high refresh rate with a 21:9 CinemaWide aspect ratio, the same one equipped with the Xperia 1 III but with a brighter screen in every color mode. Sony Xperia 1 IV was redesigned to be more square-ish and flatter in all of its dimensions, and both back and front panel now covered with Gorilla Glass Victus. The Xperia 1 IV introduced the continuous optical zoom technology for its telephoto lens, which can be moved optically on its periscope lens between 85 mm (3.5x) and 125 mm (5.2x), unlike the 1 III, where it can only move optically either 70 mm or 105 mm. However, the sensor is smaller at 1/3.5" Exmor IMX650 instead of the 1/2.9" Exmor IMX663 on the 1 III. The selfie camera was upgraded from an 8 MP Samsung S5K4H7 of 1/4.0" sensor into a 12 MP Sony IMX663 1/2.9" sensor, utilizing the same sensor of 1 III's telephoto lens, enabling the 4K video capture for selfie camera for the first time up to 30 fps, due to the redesign of the chassis of the 1 IV. All Xperia 1 IV rear cameras, except 3D iTOF, support 4K@120fps recording, the first in a smartphone. Xperia 1 IV also introduced the Music Pro app as part of the extension of the Pro application. It is the final Xperia 1 series to have the notification LED that has been a staple of Sony phones in the past and the 3D iTOF camera, as the successor removed both features. The Sony Xperia 1 IV introduced longer security patch updates for 3 years, up from 2 years, and Sony Pictures Cores (previously known as Bravia Core). The Xperia 1 IV updated the battery capacity from 4500 mAh to 5000 mAh while keeping the 30 W fast charging capabilities of the 1 III. The Xperia 1 IV is pre-installed with Android 12 and updated twice to Android 14.

==== Sony Xperia 1 V (2023) ====
On 11 May 2023, Sony announced both the Xperia 1 V and 10 V via Sony Xperia's YouTube channel, as it skipped MWC for the fourth time. It is equipped with a Qualcomm Snapdragon 8 Gen 2 (TSMC-made 4 nm), IP 65/68 water-and-dust-resistant, 12 GB or 16 GB of LPDDR5X RAM, and 256 GB or 512 GB of UFS 4.0 of expandable storage up to 1 TB. Sony Xperia 1 V premiered the first Exmor T sensor/ Sony Lytia sensor, which is equipped with 52 MP (48 MP effective), a 1/1.35" 4.3:3 multi-aspect sensor, and a 2-layer transistor pixel technology CMOS sensor for better low-light images for its main camera, replacing the Exmor RS IMX557 sensor equipped since the Sony Xperia 1 II, as well as introducing vertical orientation, focus peaking, and Product Showcase taken from the Sony ZV vlog camera series for its professional camera apps. It has a redesigned tactile blister mesh back and metal frame with a rigid frame pattern, borrowed from Sony's own Xperia PRO-I. Its 12 MP IMX663 selfie camera is now capable of recording 4K at 60 fps. Xperia 1 V keeps the 21:9 CinemaWide 4K HDR BT.2020 120 Hz OLED for the last time before its successor ditched it for the 19.5:9 FHD+ LTPO HDR 120 Hz OLED, a tradition set since the 2015 Sony Xperia Z5 Premium, where the Sony Xperia's halo flagship has a 4K display. It is also the final Sony Xperia 1 series to have the Dynamic Vibration System (DVS) introduced 5 years prior in the Sony Xperia XZ2 as the successor; the Sony Xperia 1 VI opted for coined-size vibration instead, and the last Xperia 1 series to have its professional camera apps separated before its successor unified it. Sony Xperia 1 V removed the notification LED present in every Sony phone in the past. The Sony Xperia 1 V marks the final US-bound Xperia as the successor, the 1 VI, and its compact variant, the Sony Xperia 5 V, didn't enter US market.

==== Sony Xperia 1 VI (2024) ====
Sony unveiled both the Xperia 1 VI and Xperia 10 VI on 15 May 2024 on Sony Xperia's YouTube channel and skipped the MWC event for the fifth time, which also marked the last time the Xperia 1 and 10 series launched at the same time. Xperia 1 VI is powered by the Qualcomm Snapdragon 8 Gen 3 (TSMC-made 4 nm), with an IP65/68 water-and-dust-resistant feature, coupled with 12 GB or 16 GB of LPDDR5X RAM, coupled with either 256 GB or 512 GB of UFS 4.0 expandable storage up to 1.5 TB. It exhibited an updated, longer continuous optical zoom range from the Xperia 1 IV's 85-125 mm (3.5-5.2x) optical zoom to 85-170 mm (3.5-7.1x) optical zoom, with the same sensor behind it from the Sony Xperia 1 IV and 1 V (12 MP 1/3.5" Sony Exmor RS IMX650) but with a bigger module and varied aperture to compensate for the longer zoom sensor. The main camera, ultrawide, and selfie camera are carried from the Sony Xperia 1 V. It brings back the red colorway (Scarlet) from the original Sony Xperia 5 and Sony Xperia XZ Premium. Sony Xperia 1 VI ditched the Dynamic Vibration System (DVS), the signature 21:9 CinemaWide 4K HDR BT.2020 OLED of its subsequent predecessors, with a new, more conventional 19.5:9 FHD+ LTPO HDR BT.2020 120 Hz OLED, Sony's first smartphone with LTPO display tech. Sony Xperia 1 VI introduced unified camera apps where it combined basic camera, Photo Pro, Video Pro, and Cinema Pro features into one camera application (the latter two were reintroduced in the Android 15 update), as well as vapor chamber cooling that was last seen in Xperia PRO (2020), and longer OS and security patch updates to 3 OS updates and 4 years of security patches (up to Android 17 and security patches until 2028). Xperia 1 VI also marks the first time the Xperia 1 series didn't get accompanied by a new Xperia 5 series, as Sony axed the Xperia 5 series since 2024, and the Xperia 1 VI also didn't enter the US market unlike its predecessor. Xperia 1 VI increased the wattage of its wireless charging capabilities of its subsequent predecessors from 11 W to 15 W.

==== Sony Xperia 1 VII (2025) ====
Sony released the Mark VII of the Xperia 1 series on 13 May 2025 on their YouTube channel, keeping the tradition of skipping the MWC for the sixth time. It is the first time Xperia 1 series unveiled alone without presence Xperia 10 series, as the Xperia 10 VII introduced separately 4 months later in September 2025. Xperia 1 VII is equipped with the Qualcomm Snapdragon 8 Elite (TSMC-made 3 nm), IP 65/68 water-and-dust-resistant, 12 GB or 16 GB of LPDDR5X RAM, paired with either 256 GB or 512 GB of UFS 4.0 expandable storage up to 2 TB. It kept the same 19.5:9 FHD+ LTPO HDR 120 Hz OLED display and vapor chamber cooling system that was introduced in Mark VI. It introduced a new, two-times bigger ultrawide sensor lens camera from its predecessor (12 MP f/2.2 Sony Exmor IMX563 1/2.55") to 50 MP (48 MP effective) f/2.0 1/1.56" Exmor RS IMX906 at the same 16 mm FOV and a bigger camera button. It introduced the AI Auto-Framing feature for the main and ultrawide cameras. It brings back the signature purple colorway of the Sony Xperia, last seen in the Sony Xperia 1 IV. It is also the last Sony Xperia 1 series to have a vertical camera island layout that was introduced in the original Sony Xperia 1 as its successor, the 1 VIII, which introduced a squared camera island redesign instead, as well as the last Xperia 1 series to have a rigid frame and mesh textured glass back that was seen first in Sony Xperia PRO-I and 1 V. Sony Xperia 1 VII also extended the OS and security patches updates from its predecessor, up to 4 OS updates and 6 years of security patches (up to Android 19 and secuity patches until 2031). Android 17 update for 1 VII rollout in October 2026 enables Desktop Mode.

==== Sony Xperia 1 VIII (2026) ====
Sony unveiled its Mark VIII (Mark 8) halo flagship of the Xperia 1 on 13 May 2026 on their YouTube channel. It is equipped with a Qualcomm Snapdragon 8 Elite Gen 5 (TSMC-made 3 nm), IP 65/68 water-and-dust-resistant, 12 GB or 16 GB of LPDDR5X RAM paired with 256 GB, 512 GB, or 1 TB of UFS 4.1 of expandable storage up to 2 TB. The Sony Xperia 1 VIII marks the first major redesign in the Sony Xperia 1 series since the original Xperia 1 from 2019, with a squared camera island instead of a vertical-styled camera island that its predecessor has set, and with a new glass back finish and metal frame texture called "New Ore design". It introduced a new fixed, yet four times bigger telephoto lens camera from its predecessor and ditched its signature continuous optical zoom of its subsequent predecessors since 1 IV (12 MP f/2.3-3.5 Sony Exmor IMX650 1/3.5" 3.5-7.1x optical zoom) to 50 MP (48 MP effective) f/2.8 1/1.56" Exmor RS IMX906 at 2.9x optical zoom with 5.8x hybrid zoom capabilities, where its telephoto is now capable of the AI Auto-Framing feature that was introduced in Mark VII that was limited to main and ultrawide camera. It introduced a new, however controversial feature of AI Camera Assistant for its camera software that generated discussion, and it got updated version enabling up to 3 custom looks in Android 17 updates, alongside Desktop Mode, updated screen recording mode, and new Material You implementation. It has the same update policy as its predecessor (up to 4 OS updates and 6 years of security patches; Android 20 and security patches until 2032).

== See also ==
- Sony Xperia
- Sony Xperia Z series
- Sony Xperia XA series
- Sony Xperia 10 series
- Sony Xperia 5 series
