= Sony Xperia 10 series =

Line of Android smartphones

Sony Xperia 10 Series
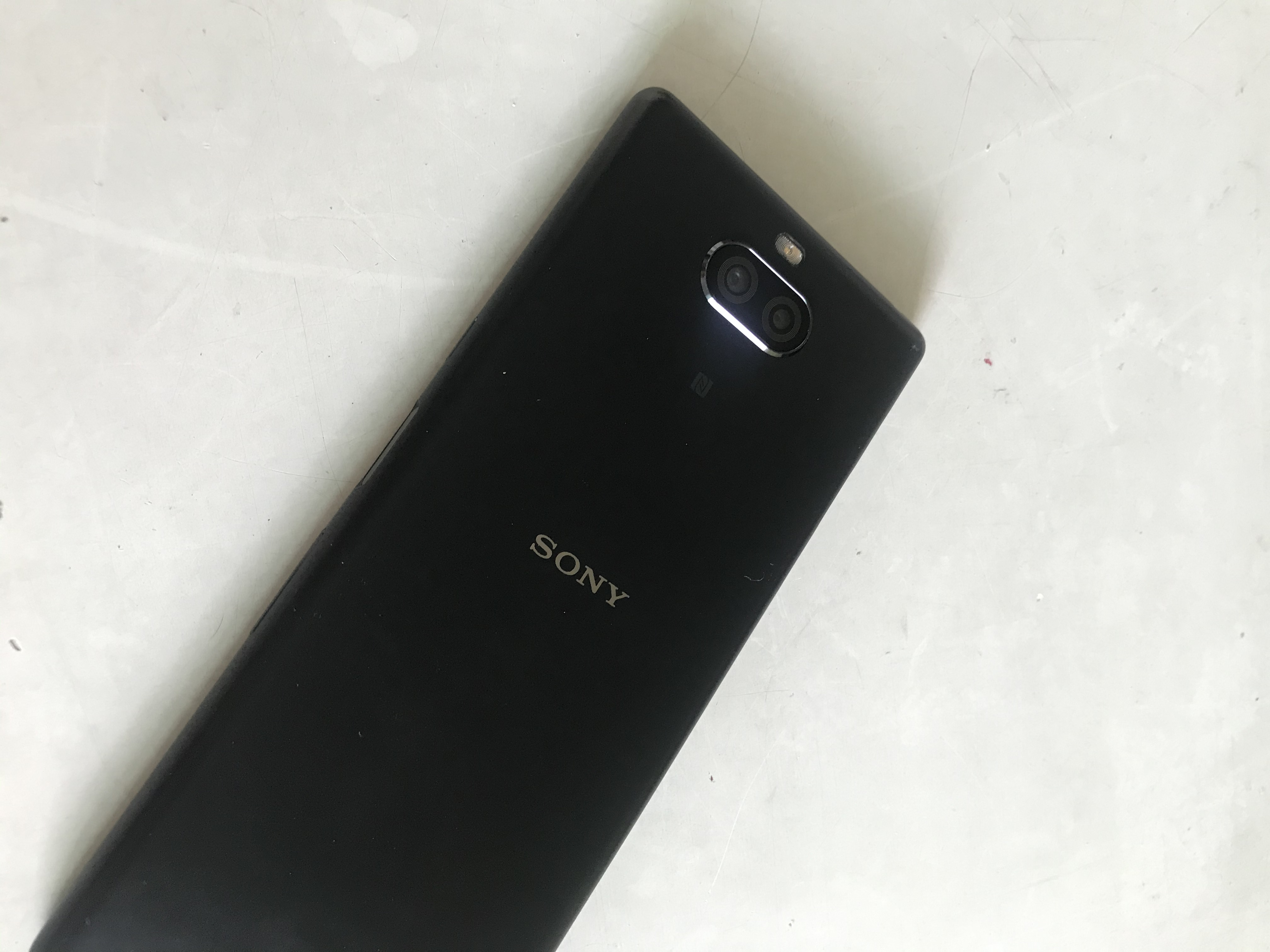
- Sony Xperia 10 (2019) in Black
- Developer: Sony
- Manufacturer: Sony Electronics; Sony Mobile
- Product family: Sony Xperia
- Type: Smartphones
- Generation: 8
- Released: February 25, 2019; 7 years ago
- Lifespan: 2019-present
- Introductory price: ~ 300 USD - 600 USD
- Media: Sony Music, Video Creator App (Xperia 10 VI and up)
- Operating system: Android
- System on a chip: Global: Qualcomm Snapdragon (2019−present)
- CPU: Sony Xperia 10: Snapdragon 630; 10 Plus: Snapdragon 636; Sony Xperia 10 II: Snapdragon 665 4G; Sony Xperia 10 III: Snapdragon 690 5G; Sony Xperia 10 IV: Snapdragon 695 5G; Sony Xperia 10 V: Snapdragon 695 5G; Sony Xperia 10 VI: Snapdragon 6 Gen 1 Sony Xperia 10 VII: Snapdragon 6 Gen 3 Sony Xperia 10 VIII: Snapdragon 6 Gen 3
- Memory: Sony Xperia 10: 3/4 GB, 10 Plus: 4/6 GB; Sony Xperia 10 II: 4 GB; Sony Xperia 10 III—Sony Xperia 10 IV: 6 GB; Sony Xperia 10 V: 6/8 GB; Sony Xperia 10 VI - present: 8 GB (LPDDR; Sony Xperia 10 - 10 VII: LPDDR4X; Sony Xperia 10 VIII: LPDDR5)
- Storage: eMMC, Universal Flash Storage (UFS); Xperia 10/10 Plus - 10 II: eMMC 5.1; Xperia 10 III - 10 IV: UFS 2.1; Xperia 10 V - VI: UFS 2.2; Xperia 10 VII-VIII: UFS 3.1
- Removable storage: MicroSD card slot support Xperia 10/10 Plus: up to 512 GB; Xperia 10 II - V: 1 TB; Xperia 10 VI: 1.5 TB; Xperia 10 VII - VIII: 2 TB
- Display: 21:9 FHD+ IPS LCD (2019, Xperia 10/10 Plus); 21:9 FHD+ OLED (2020, Xperia 10 II); 21:9 FHD+ HDR OLED (2021-2024, Xperia 10 III - 10 VI); 19.5:9 FHD+ LTPS 120Hz HDR OLED (2025-present, 10 VII - 10 VIII)
- Graphics: Adreno GPU
- Sound: Mono Speakers (Xperia 10/10 Plus - 10 IV) Stereo Speakers Xperia 10 V - present: Front-firing stereo speakers
- Input: Touchscreen
- Camera: Main + Telephoto (only from 10 Plus, 10 II to 10 V) + Ultrawide (since 10 II) + Depth (only the original Xperia 10)
- Connectivity: 2G; 3G; 4G; 5G (Xperia 10 III and up); Bluetooth 5.0-5.4; Wi-Fi 802.11 a/b/g/n/ac - a/b/g/n/ac/ax (2.4/5GHz); NFC; USB-C 2.0 (all Xperia 10 series except 10 III), 3.1 (supports DisplayPort) (only 10 III); GPS with Assisted GPS; Galileo; GLONASS; BeiDou
- Weight: 159 g (5.6 oz) - 180 g (6.3 oz)
- Model Number: I3XXX, XQ-xx5x/6x/7xx
- Predecessor: Sony Xperia C series, Sony Xperia M series (2013-2015); Sony Xperia XA series, Sony Xperia X series (2016-2018); Sony Xperia 5 Series (2019-2023; indirect, size-wise)
- Related: Sony Xperia 1 Series; Sony Xperia 5 Series
- Website: https://www.sony.co.uk/smartphones/gallery

The Sony Xperia 10 series is the current line of midrange Android smartphones in the Sony Xperia series manufactured by Sony Mobile since 2019. It succeeded the Xperia C series, Xperia M series, Xperia XA series, and "Premium Standard" Xperia X series. Unlike in the Xperia C, Xperia M, Xperia XA, and the Xperia X naming schemes, the Sony Xperia 10 series (and subsequently the other numeral series introduced in 2019) borrowed its nomenclature from its Sony Alpha camera division, where every succession of Xperia numeral series is stated with "Mark" (e.g., Sony Xperia 10 II, spelled as Sony Xperia 10 Mark 2), and released annually like the XA series but unlike the C series and M series. The current iteration of the Xperia 10 series is the Sony Xperia 10 VIII. Xperia 10 series indirectly succeeded the now-defunct Xperia 5 series in size-wise.

== Models ==
=== Smartphones ===
==== Sony Xperia 10 VI (2024) ====
On 15 May 2024, Sony unveiled both the Xperia 1 VI and 10 VI via their YouTube channel, skipping MWC for the fifth time. It is the final time where both the Xperia 1 and the Xperia 10 series were announced simultaneously. It is powered by the Qualcomm Snapdragon 6 Gen 1, an upgrade compared to its predecessor, coupled with 8 GB of LPDDR4X RAM and 128 GB of UFS 2.2 of expandable storage. Xperia 10 VI's Android 17 update has been cancelled due to instability of its storage configuration.

==== Sony Xperia 10 VII (2025) ====
On 12 September 2025, Sony announced the seventh generation of the Xperia 10 (10 VII) on their YouTube channel, ditching any major events to announce it. It is the first Xperia 10 series not to be announced together with the Sony Xperia 1 series. Sony Xperia 10 VII brings a major overhaul to the Xperia 10 series in design (including reintroducing the Xperia insignia embossed on the left side frame from and since the Xperia Z5), hardware, and software. It is equipped with the same 6.1-inch display as its predecessor, but instead of a 21:9 aspect ratio of 10 VI, it is equipped with a 19.5:9 aspect ratio, with FHD+ resolution, with an LTPS HDR OLED display, and now supports a 120 Hz high refresh rate without cutout, the first for the Xperia 10 series. Powered by Qualcomm Snapdragon 6 Gen 3, a generation newer than its predecessor, coupled with a sole configuration of 8 GB of LPDDR4X RAM and 128 GB of UFS 3.1 of expandable storage, up to 2 TB. Xperia 10 VII introduced an overhaul to Xperia 10's rear camera system and upgraded both the main and ultrawide sensors in size and megapixels from 48 MP 26 mm 1/2.0" f/1.8 IMX582 with PDAF OIS + 8 MP 16 mm f/2.2 1/4.0" Hynix HI846 fixed-focus to 50 MP 24 mm 1/1.56" f/1.9 with multi-directional PDAF OIS + 13 MP 16 mm f/2.4 1/3.06" Smartsens SC1320 fixed-focus, while keeping the same selfie camera albeit from Smartsens instead of Hynix (SC820).

==== Sony Xperia 10 VIII (2026) ====
Sony unveiled the Mark 8 of the Xperia 10 series on 25 August 2026, via Sony Xperia's YouTube channel, skipping any major tech events since 2020 (either IFA or MWC). It is equipped with a 6.1-inch 19.5:9 FHD+ LTPS HDR OLED display with a 120 Hz high refresh rate without cutout. Powered by Qualcomm Snapdragon 6 Gen 3, the same chipset as its predecessor, coupled with a single tier of 8 GB of LPDDR5 RAM and 128 GB of UFS 3.1 of expandable storage, up to 2 TB. The Xperia 10 VIII is the first Xperia to be offered with a virtual RAM boost, up to 6 GB. It has the same redesign horizontal bar-style camera island and Xperia insignia embossed on the side that was introduced by the Xperia 10 VII from 2025, including retaining the single-step shutter button and headphone jack with three new colors (frosted grey, frozen white, and misty lilac), as well as all three camera setups (two at the rear, one in the front) consisting of a 50 MP f/1.9 1/1.56" Sony Exmor RS IMX766 24 mm main camera with OIS and multi-directional PDAF and a 13 MP f/2.2 1/3.06" Smartsens SC1320 16 mm ultrawide without autofocus and an 8 MP f/2.0 1/4.0" Smartsens SC820 26 mm front-facing camera.

== See also ==
- Sony Xperia
- Sony Xperia 1 Series
- Sony Xperia 5 Series
- Sony Xperia XA Series
- Sony Xperia Z series
