= Sony Xperia 10 VI =

2024 Android smartphones

- Also known as: Sony Xperia 10 Mark VI
- Brand: Sony
- Developer: Sony
- Manufacturer: Sony Mobile
- Type: Smartphone
- Series: Sony Xperia
- Family: Sony Xperia 10 Series
- First released: 15 May 2024; 2 years ago
- Availability by region: Japan; Taiwan; Hong Kong; Singapore; Germany; United Kingdom; Austria; Malaysia; France
- Predecessor: Sony Xperia 10 V
- Successor: Sony Xperia 10 VII
- Related: Sony Xperia 1 VI
- Compatible networks: 2G; 3G; 4G LTE; 5G NR
- Form factor: Slate
- Colors: Black; Blue; White
- Dimensions: 155 mm (6.1 in) H 68 mm (2.7 in) W 8.3 mm (0.33 in) D
- Weight: 164 g (5.8 oz)
- Operating system: Android 14; Up to 3 major Android upgrades, 4 years of security patches, upgradable to Android 16 ineligible to receive Android 17
- System-on-chip: Qualcomm Snapdragon 6 Gen 1
- CPU: Octa-core, 4 nm (SF4); 4x2.2 GHz Cortex-A78 + 4x1.8 GHz Cortex-A55
- GPU: Adreno 710
- Modem: Qualcomm Snapdragon X62 5G
- Memory: LPDDR4X RAM; 8 GB
- Storage: Universal Flash Storage (UFS 2.2); 128 GB
- Removable storage: microSDXC, expandable up to 1.5 TB (shared SIM slot)
- SIM: nanoSIM, eSIM, 1 nanoSIM + 1 eSIM, 1 nanoSIM + 1 nanoSIM
- Battery: Non-removable Li-ion 5000 mAh; USB PD 3.1 21 W Charging
- Charging: Fast Charging USB PD 3.1 21 W Charging
- Rear camera: 48 MP (Sony Exmor RS IMX582), f/1.8, 26 mm (wide), 1/2.0", 0.8 μm, PDAF, OIS; 8 MP (Hynix HI846), f/2.2, 120˚, 16 mm (ultrawide), 1/4", 1.12 μm; 4K@30fps, 1080p@30/60/120 fps
- Front camera: 8MP (Hynix HI846), f/2.0, 26mm (wide) (1/4.0", 1.12 μm), fixed focus 1080p@30 fps
- Display: 6.1 in (150 mm) LTPS FHD+ 21:9 (2520 x 1080) HDR10 OLED, ~449 pixel density Gorilla Glass Victus 2 HDR10
- Sound: Front stereo speakers and 3.5 mm headphone jack
- Media: Music, Video Creator app
- Connectivity: Wi-Fi 802.11 a/b/g/n/ac (2.4/5GHz); Bluetooth 5.2; USB-C 2.0; NFC; GPS with Assisted GPS; Galileo; GLONASS; BeiDou
- Data inputs: Sensors: Accelerometer; Fingerprint scanner (side-mounted, always on); Gyroscope; Proximity sensor; Compass
- Water resistance: IP65/IP68
- Development status: Released, Discontinued
- Other: IP65/IP68 Water/dust resistant
- Website: https://centresdirect.co.uk/p-56016-xperia-10-vi-powerful-battery-super-lightweight.aspx

The Sony Xperia 10 VI is a midrange smartphone unveiled by Sony on 15 May 2024. It was revealed at the same time as the flagship Sony Xperia 1 VI. It featured a redesigned vertical camera island seen first in the Sony Xperia 5 V and a 6.1-inch LTPS FHD+ OLED screen with Sony's signature 21:9 aspect ratio, powered by a Qualcomm Snapdragon 6 Gen 1 chipset paired with 8 GB of RAM and 128 GB of UFS 2.2 storage, a step up from its predecessors' Snapdragon 695, and 6 GB of RAM. The phone includes a 3.5mm headphone jack and supports expandable storage via a microSD card slot up to 1.5 TB. It is the final Xperia ever to be equipped with a 21:9 aspect ratio since the introduction of the original Xperia 1 and Xperia 10, as its successor, the Sony Xperia 10 VII, equipped with a 19.5:9 aspect ratio, similar to the one equipped in the Xperia 1 VI.

== Hardware ==
For the sixth generation of Xperia 10, Sony removed the dedicated telephoto lens, akin to the Xperia 5 V, and kept the rest of the lenses from its predecessor, the Sony Xperia 10 V. It kept the front-facing stereo speakers and the 3.5 mm headphone jack features of the Xperia 10 V as well. Its redesign has a similar design to the Sony Xperia 5 V. The Sony Xperia 10 VI restores the 4K@30fps video recording with its main camera, last seen in the Sony Xperia 10 III from 2021, where the Snapdragon 6 Gen 1's ISP brought back the capability since the Qualcomm Snapdragon 690. After its two subsequent predecessors, both the Sony Xperia 10 IV and Sony Xperia 10 V were unable to capture 4K@30fps video recording due to the Snapdragon 695's ISP limitations. The 10 VI also offer new options of 1080p@60fps/120fps video recording options as well.

== Software ==
The Sony Xperia 10 VI shipped with Android 14 out of the box, the same as the Sony Xperia 1 VI, with up to 3 OS updates and 4 years of security patches. It received Android 15 updates on 18 February 2025 and Android 16 updates on 24 October 2025. However, it was excluded from the upcoming Android 17 update list Sony shared after the Sony Xperia 1 VIII received its Android 17 update in September 2026 on its press release.

=== Android 17 update cancelled ===
On 19 October 2026, Sony UK issued the official notice that the Sony Xperia 10 VI's Android 17 update has been officially cancelled because of "limitations associated with the device’s storage configuration." where the Xperia 10 VI has been tested for the Android 17 build update like the other Xperias; however, it was deemed inadequate to run Android 17 smoothly unlike the other eligible Xperias, including its subsequent successors (the 10 VII and 10 VIII), hence its final OS update is Android 16. Sony has since apologized and pledged to keep delivering its mandatory four years of security patches promises to the 10 VI, which should end in June 2028. It is the first time since 2014 Sony has cancelled further OS updates for its Xperia midrange lineup since the Xperia C, Xperia L, Xperia M, and Xperia SP.
