= Sony Xperia 1 V =

2023 Android smartphone

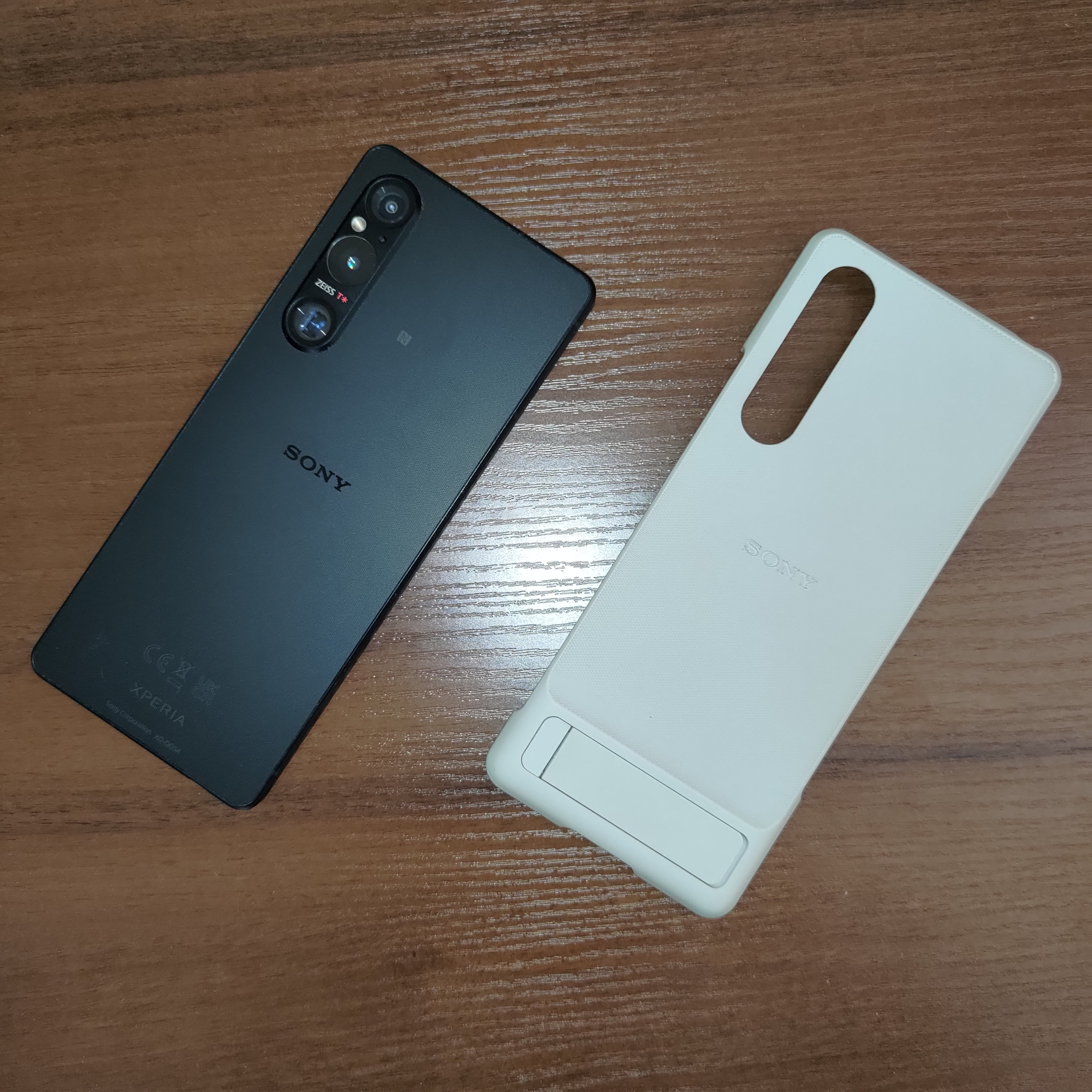
- A Black Sony Xperia 1 V next to an official Platinum Gray Style Cover for said phone
- Also known as: Sony Xperia 1 Mark V
- Brand: Sony
- Manufacturer: Sony
- Type: Smartphone
- Series: Sony Xperia
- Family: Sony Xperia 1 Series
- First released: 11 May 2023; 3 years ago
- Availability by region: Japan: 16 June 2023; 3 years ago (SO-51D、SOG10、A301SO); United Kingdom: 29 June 2023; 3 years ago Japan: 14 July 2023; 3 years ago (XQ-DQ44); United States: 28 July 2023; 3 years ago India: 21 September 2023; 3 years ago
- Predecessor: Sony Xperia 1 IV
- Successor: Sony Xperia 1 VI
- Related: Sony Xperia 10 V Sony Xperia 5 V
- Compatible networks: 2G; 3G; 4G LTE; 5G NR; WiMAX 2+ (SOG10 model only)
- Form factor: Slate
- Colors: Black; Platinum Silver; Khaki Green
- Dimensions: 165 mm (6.5 in) H 71 mm (2.8 in) W 8.2 mm (0.32 in) D
- Weight: 187 g (6.6 oz)
- Operating system: Android 13 (Upgradable to Android 15), 2 OS updates, 3 years of security patches
- System-on-chip: Qualcomm Snapdragon 8 Gen 2 (SM8550-AB)
- CPU: Octa-core, 4 nm (4LPE); 1x 3.20 GHz Kryo Prime (ARM Cortex-X3-based); 4x 2.80 GHz Kryo Gold (2× ARM Cortex-A715, 2× ARM Cortex-A710-based); 3x 2.0 GHz Kryo Silver (ARM Cortex-A510-based)
- GPU: Adreno 740
- Modem: Qualcomm Snapdragon X70 5G
- Memory: LPDDR5X RAM; 12 GB (SO-51D, SOG10, A301SO, XQ-DQ54, XQ-DQ62 and XQ-DQ72 models); 16 GB (XQ-DQ44 model)
- Storage: Universal Flash Storage (UFS 4.0); 256 GB (SO-51D, SOG10, A301SO, XQ-DQ54, XQ-DQ62 and XQ-DQ72 models); 512 GB (XQ-DQ44 model)
- Removable storage: microSDXC, expandable up to 1 TB
- SIM: nanoSIM, eSIM, 1 nanoSIM + 1 eSIM; 1 nanoSIM + 1 nanoSIM
- Battery: Non-removable Li-ion 5000 mAh; USB PD 3.1 30 W Charging; Qi Wireless Charging
- Charging: Fast Charging USB PD 3.1 30 W Charging; Qi 11 W Wireless Charging
- Rear camera: 52 MP effectively used 48 MP (Sony Exmor T IMX888), f/1.9, 24 mm (wide), 1/1.35", 1.12 μm, Dual Pixel PDAF, OIS; 12 MP (Sony Exmor RS IMX650), f/2.3, 85 mm (telephoto), f/2.8, 125 mm (telephoto), 1/3.5", Dual Pixel PDAF, 3.5x/5.2x optical zoom, OIS; 12 MP (Sony Exmor RS IMX563), f/2.2, 124˚, 16 mm (ultrawide), 1/2.55", Dual Pixel PDAF; 4K@24/25/30/60/120 fps, 1080p@30/60/120/240 fps
- Front camera: 12 MP (Sony Exmor RS IMX663), 1/2.93", f/2.0, 20 mm (wide) 4K@30/60fps, 1080fps@30/60fps, HDR
- Display: 6.5 in (170 mm) 4K 21:9 (3840 x 1644) HDR OLED CinemaWide display, ~643 pixel density Gorilla Glass Victus 2 HDR10; HLG; 10-bit color depth 120 Hz refresh rate
- Sound: Front stereo speakers and 3.5 mm headphone jack 4 Pole; Cirrus Logic Speaker Amp x2 High-Resolution Audio; High-Resolution Audio Wireless; 360 Reality Audio hardware decoding Dolby Atmos tuned by Sony Pictures and Sony Music; DSEE Ultimate; Stereo Recording; SBC; AAC; Qualcomm aptX; Qualcomm aptX HD; Qualcomm aptX adaptive Qualcomm aptX TWS+ LDAC
- Media: Game Enhancer, Sony Pictures Core, Music, Video Editor app
- Connectivity: Wi-Fi 802.11 a/b/g/n/ac/ax (2.4/5GHz); Bluetooth 5.3; USB-C 3.2 (supports DisplayPort); NFC; GPS with Assisted GPS; Galileo; GLONASS; BeiDou; FM radio (SO-51D, SOG10 and A301SO models only); Mobile FeliCa/Osaifu-Keitai (XQ-DQ44, SO-51D, SOG10 and A301SO models only)
- Data inputs: Sensors: Accelerometer; Barometer; Fingerprint scanner (side-mounted, always on); Gyroscope; Proximity sensor; Color spectrum sensor
- Water resistance: IP65/IP68
- Development status: Released, Discontinued
- Made in: Thailand
- Other: Native Sony Alpha support IP65/IP68 Water/dust resistant PS5 Remote Play; DUALSENSE® Control compatibility Game Enhancer
- Website: https://www.sony.co.uk/electronics/xperia-1m5/campaign

The Sony Xperia 1 V (Note: The model's Roman numeral suffix is read "Mark V" (mark five).) is an Android-based smartphone manufactured by Sony. Launched on May 11, 2023, it succeeds the Xperia 1 IV as the past flagship of Sony's Xperia series. The device was announced along with the mid-range Xperia 10 V, with expected release dates by June 2023 for Japan and European markets and July 2023 for the US. Xperia 1 V marks the final Sony Xperia to be sold in the United States market, as its compact counterpart, the Xperia 5 V, and its subsequent successors, the Xperia 1 VI, VII, and VIII, aren't sold in the United States.

== Specifications ==
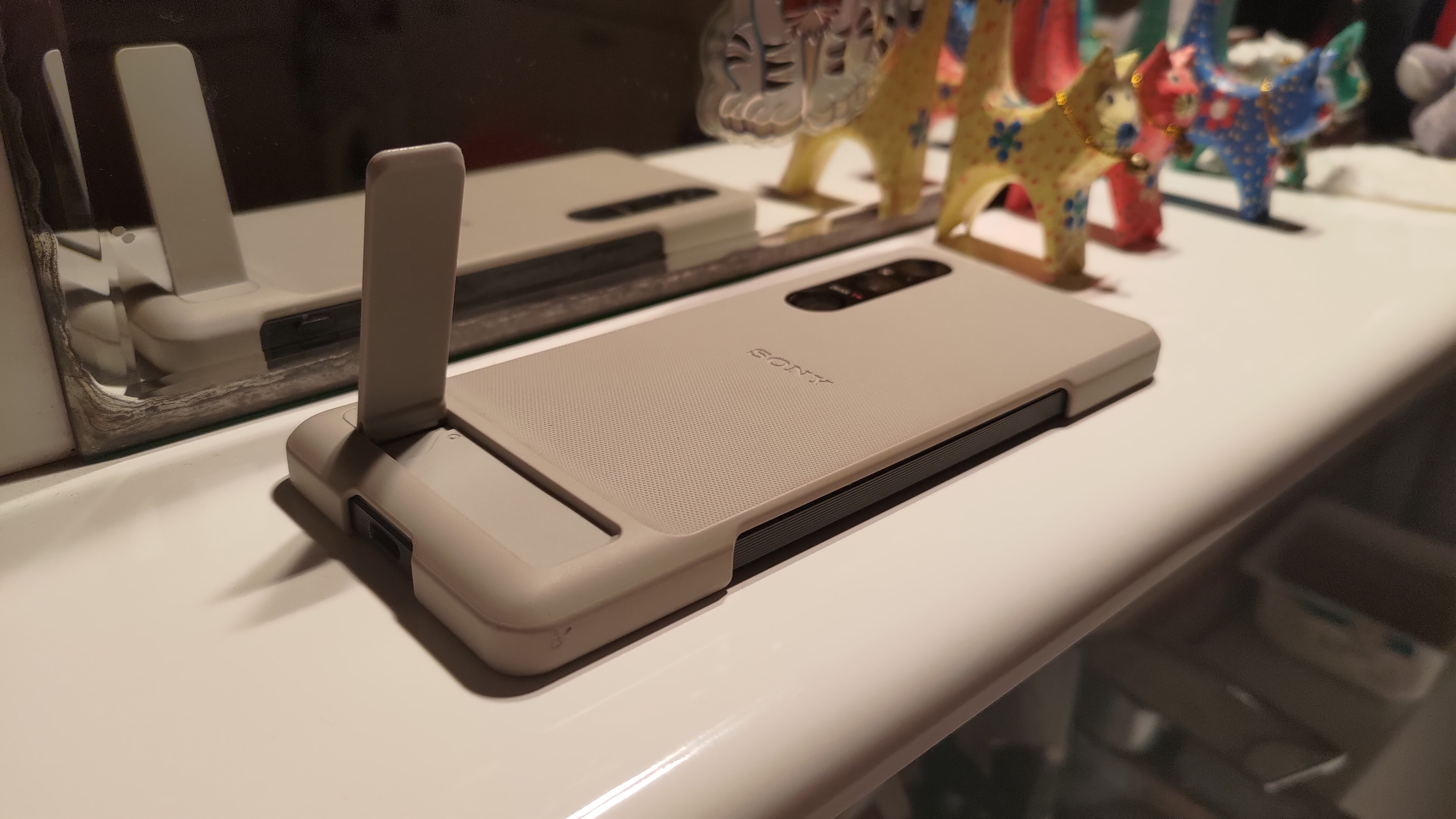
Sony Xperia 1 V with the Style Cover kickstand propped up for a showcase

The Xperia 1 V marks the last Xperia to have a 4K display and 21:9 CinemaWide display, as its successor, the Xperia 1 VI, opted for an LTPO FHD+ display and ditched the 21:9 aspect ratio display with a more conventional 19.5:9 instead. It is also the final Xperia to be equipped with the Dynamic Vibration System (DVS), a legacy feature from the Sony Xperia XZ2 and separated camera apps.

While visually similar to its predecessor, the Xperia 1 V incorporates subtle exterior changes, including grooved side rails and a micro-dot textured rear panel designed to enhance grip. For durability, the device is built with Corning Gorilla Glass Victus 2 on the display and holds IP65/IP68 certifications for water and dust resistance.

The device features a versatile set of audio options, supporting playback via integrated stereo speakers, a 3.5 mm headphone jack, and multiple high-bitrate Bluetooth codecs. For mobile gaming and content creation, it includes built-in live-streaming functionality alongside its high-fidelity dual speaker system.

Powered by the Qualcomm Snapdragon 8 Gen 2 processor, the handset demonstrated strong results in synthetic benchmark testing. However, thermal throttling limits its sustained peak performance compared to specialized gaming smartphones. Despite these limitations, the device remains capable across general multimedia and gaming workloads.

== See also ==
- List of longest smartphone telephoto lenses
