= Sony Xperia 10 VII =

2025 smartphone model

- Also known as: Sony Xperia 10 Mark VII
- Developer: Sony
- Manufacturer: Sony Mobile
- Type: Smartphone
- Series: Sony Xperia
- Family: Sony Xperia 10 series
- First released: 19 September 2025; 13 months ago
- Availability by region: Japan; Taiwan; Hong Kong; Singapore; Germany; United Kingdom; Austria; France; Malaysia
- Predecessor: Sony Xperia 10 VI; Sony Xperia 5 V, Sony Xperia 5 Series (indirect)
- Successor: Sony Xperia 10 VIII
- Related: Sony Xperia 1 VII
- Compatible networks: 2G; 3G; 4G LTE; 5G NR
- Form factor: Slate
- Colors: White; Turquoise; Charcoal
- Dimensions: 153 mm (6.0 in) H 72 mm (2.8 in) W 8.3 mm (0.33 in) D
- Weight: 168 g (5.9 oz)
- Operating system: Android 15; Up to 4 major Android upgrades, 6 years of security patches, upgradable to Android 16
- System-on-chip: Qualcomm Snapdragon 6 Gen 3
- CPU: Octa-core, 4 nm (SF4); 4x2.4 GHz Cortex-A78 + 4x1.8 GHz Cortex-A55
- GPU: Adreno 710
- Modem: Qualcomm Snapdragon X62 5G
- Memory: LPDDR4X RAM; 8 GB
- Storage: Universal Flash Storage (UFS 3.1); 128 GB
- Removable storage: microSDXC, expandable up to 2 TB (shared SIM slot)
- SIM: nanoSIM, eSIM, 1 nanoSIM + 1 eSIM, 1 nanoSIM + 1 nanoSIM
- Battery: Non-removable Li-ion 5000 mAh; USB PD 3.1 30 W Charging
- Charging: Fast Charging USB PD 3.1 30 W Charging
- Rear camera: 50 MP (Sony Exmor RS IMX766), f/1.9, 24 mm (wide), 1/1.56", 1.0 μm, multi-directional PDAF, OIS; 13 MP effectively used 12 MP (Smartsens SC1320CS), f/2.4, 120˚, 16 mm (ultrawide), 1/3.06", 1.12 μm; 4K@30 fps, 1080p@30/60/120 fps
- Front camera: 8MP (SmartSens SC820CS), f/2.0, 26mm (wide) (1/4.0", 1.12 μm), fixed focus 1080p@30 fps
- Display: 6.1 in (150 mm) LTPS FHD+ 19.5:9 (2340 x 1080) HDR10 OLED, ~422 pixel density Gorilla Glass Victus 2 HDR10; 120 Hz refresh rate
- Sound: Front stereo speakers and 3.5 mm headphone jack
- Media: Music, Video Creator app
- Connectivity: Wi-Fi 802.11 a/b/g/n/ac/ax (2.4/5GHz); Bluetooth 5.4; USB-C 2.0; NFC; GPS with Assisted GPS; Galileo; GLONASS; BeiDou
- Data inputs: Sensors: Accelerometer; Fingerprint scanner (side-mounted, always on); Gyroscope; Proximity sensor; Compass
- Water resistance: IP65/IP68
- Development status: Released
- Made in: China
- Other: IP65/IP68 Water/dust resistant

The Sony Xperia 10 VII is a midrange smartphone unveiled by Sony on September 12, 2025. It was revealed almost 4 months after the flagship, the Sony Xperia 1 VII. It features a new redesigned horizontal bar-like rear camera design, a departure from the vertical upper left camera layout of the Xperia 10 VI, and a 6.1-inch LTPS FHD+ OLED screen, now with 120 Hz high refresh rate support with a 19.5:9 aspect ratio instead of its predecessor's 21:9 aspect ratio, powered by the Qualcomm Snapdragon 6 Gen 3 chipset, a newer version of the Qualcomm Snapdragon 6 Gen 1 of its predecessor. The phone includes a 3.5mm headphone jack and supports expandable storage via a microSDXC card slot.

== Hardware ==
The Sony Xperia 10 VII shipped with a single tier of 8 GB LPDDR4X RAM and 128 GB UFS 3.1 of expandable storage up to 2 TB, an upgrade from its predecessor (10 VI) UFS 2.2 type of storage. Xperia 10 VII brings back the Xperia insignia embossed to the left side frame from the 2015 Sony's third-quarter flagship Xperia Z5 series.

=== Camera ===
Sony Xperia 10 VII brings notable improvement for its rear camera, where both the main camera and ultrawide lens got sensor upgrades, where the main camera upgraded to a bigger, better 50 MP 1/1.56" IMX766 sensor with OIS from the 48 MP 1/2.0" IMX582 sensor with OIS of 10 VI, and the ultrawide received 13 MP 1/3.06" Smartsens SC1320 from its predecessor's 8 MP ultrawide 1/4.0" sensor. The selfie camera resolution was carried over from its predecessor, the Xperia 10 VI, albeit from a different manufacturer (Smartsens SC820 instead of Hynix HI846). Sony Xperia 10 VII marks the return of the dedicated shutter button in the Sony mid-range lineup since the Sony Xperia XA2 series, albeit without the two-step mechanism of its flagship Xperia 1 series or XA series of the past.

== Software ==
Xperia 10 VII comes with Android 15, with Sony's Xperia Home UI, with up to 4 major Android upgrades and 6 years of security updates promised, up from 3 major Android upgrades and 4 years of security patches of its predecessor. It received the Android 16 update in November 2025. It will receive the upcoming Android 17 update alongside the Xperia 10 VIII, 1 VI, 1 VII, and 1 VIII with a new wallpaper and style features, updated quick settings panel toggles, and the new screen recording feature.
