= Sony Xperia 1 VI =

2024 Android smartphone

- Also known as: Sony Xperia 1 Mark VI
- Developer: Sony
- Manufacturer: Sony Mobile
- Type: Smartphone
- Series: Sony Xperia
- Family: Sony Xperia 1 Series
- First released: 3 June 2024; 2 years ago
- Availability by region: Japan; United Kingdom; Taiwan; Hong Kong; Malaysia; Singapore; European Union (Germany, Austria,France)
- Predecessor: Sony Xperia 1 V
- Successor: Sony Xperia 1 VII
- Related: Sony Xperia 10 VI
- Compatible networks: 2G; 3G; 4G LTE; 5G NR
- Form factor: Slate
- Colors: Black; Platinum Silver; Khaki Green; Scarlet (Red)
- Dimensions: 162 mm (6.4 in) H 74 mm (2.9 in) W 8.2 mm (0.32 in) D
- Weight: 192 g (6.8 oz)
- Operating system: Android 14 (Upgradable to Android 16); 3 OS updates, 4 years of security patches
- System-on-chip: Qualcomm Snapdragon 8 Gen 3 (SM8650-AB)
- CPU: Octa-core, 4 nm (4LPE); 1x 3.30 GHz Kryo Prime (ARM Cortex-X4-based); 3x 3.20 GHz Kryo Gold (3× ARM Cortex-A720, 3× ARM Cortex-A720-based); 2x 3.00 GHz Kryo Gold (2× ARM Cortex-A720, 2× ARM Cortex-A720-based); 2x 2.30 GHz Kryo Silver (ARM Cortex-A520-based)
- GPU: Adreno 750
- Modem: Qualcomm Snapdgraon X75 5G
- Memory: LPDDR5X RAM; 12 GB (XQ-EC54, XQ-EC72); 16 GB (XQ-EC44; Japan only)
- Storage: Universal Flash Storage (UFS 4.0); 256 GB (XQ-EC54, XQ-EC72); 512 GB (XQ-EC44, XQ-EC54 in Scarlet)
- Removable storage: microSDXC, expandable up to 1.5 TB
- SIM: nanoSIM, eSIM (XQ-EC44, XQ-EC54), nanoSIM, nanoSIM (XQ-EC72)
- Battery: Non-removable Li-ion 5000 mAh; USB PD 3.1 30 W Charging; Qi Wireless Charging
- Charging: Fast Charging USB PD 3.1 30 W Charging; Qi 15 W Wireless Charging
- Rear camera: 52 MP effectively used 48 MP (Sony Exmor T IMX888/Lytia LYT-800), f/1.9, 24 mm (wide), 1/1.35", 1.12 μm, Dual Pixel PDAF, OIS; 12 MP (Sony Exmor RS IMX650), f/2.3, 85 mm (telephoto), f/3.5, 170 mm (telephoto), 1/3.5", Dual Pixel PDAF, 3.5x/7.1x optical zoom, OIS; 12 MP (Sony Exmor RS IMX563), f/2.2, 124˚, 16 mm (ultrawide), 1/2.55", Dual Pixel PDAF; 4K@24/25/30/60/120 fps, 1080p@30/60/120 fps, HDR
- Front camera: 12 MP (Sony Exmor RS IMX663), f/2.0, 20 mm (wide) 1/2.93", 5-axis gyro-EIS, HDR Photo, Portrait selfie, Display flash, Hand and Smile Shutter 4K@30/60fps, 1080@30/60fps
- Display: 6.5 in (170 mm) 1080p+ 19.5:9 (2340 x 1080) HDR OLED, ~396 pixel density Gorilla Glass Victus 2 HDR10; HLG; 10-bit color depth 120 Hz refresh rate
- Sound: Front Full-stage stereo speakers and 3.5 mm headphone jack 4 Pole; Cirrus Logic Speaker Amp x2 High-Resolution Audio; High-Resolution Audio Wireless; 360 Reality Audio hardware decoding Dolby Atmos tuned by Sony Pictures and Sony Music; DSEE Ultimate; Stereo Recording; SBC; AAC; Qualcomm aptX; Qualcomm aptX HD; Qualcomm aptX adaptive Qualcomm aptX TWS+ LDAC
- Media: Game Enchaner, Sony Pictures Core
- Connectivity: Wi-Fi 802.11 a/b/g/n/ac/ax/be (2.4/5GHz); Bluetooth 5.4; USB-C 3.2 Gen 1 (supports DisplayPort); NFC; GPS with Assisted GPS; Galileo; GLONASS; BeiDou
- Data inputs: Sensors: Accelerometer; Barometer; Fingerprint scanner (side-mounted, always on); Gyroscope; Proximity sensor
- Water resistance: IP65/IP68
- Development status: Released
- Made in: Thailand
- Other: Native Sony Alpha support IP65/IP68 Water/dust resistant PS5 Remote Play; DUALSENSE® Control compatibility Game Enhancer

Sony Xperia 1 VI is a high-end smartphone product of the Sony Xperia 1 range. The phone was released on May 15, 2024, powered by the Snapdragon 8 Gen 3 chipset and Qualcomm Snapdragon X75 modem. The phone's display has a 19.5:9 aspect ratio with FHD+ resolution with HDR BT.2020 support and OLED LTPO technology, unlike the 21:9 CinemaWide with a 4K display like the previous model, and it has an upgraded telephoto camera.

The phone was not released in the United States.

== Hardware ==
There is a dedicated shutter button.

It is equipped with the following camera lenses:

- 48 MP — 24 mm effective primary lens with AI Auto Focus.
- 12 MP — 16 mm ultrawide lens with Dual Pixel PDAF.
- 12 MP — Telephoto optical zoom lens with a focal length of 85 to 170 mm, allowing for long-distance shooting up to x7.1 zoom.

The Xperia 1 VI comes in Black, Platinum Silver, Khaki Green, and Scarlet Red. Its display uses a 6.50-inch 120 Hz LTPO OLED panel with a BRAVIA screen, which supports the HDR BT.2020 standard. Unlike its predecessor, the Xperia 1 V, it has an FHD+ resolution instead of 4K.

It has a two-day battery life with a 5000 mAh lithium battery. It has updated wireless charging wattage capabilities to 15 W from 11 W of its predecessor.

The phone has an IP65 and IP68 standard dust and water body protection. Sony Xperia 1 VI also re-introduced vapor chamber cooling for its flagship phone since it was last used by the Xperia PRO (2020) and the first for the Xperia 1 series.

It has 12 GB of LPDDR5X RAM paired with 256 GB or 512 GB of UFS 4.0 storage.

On 14 October 2024, it received an update enabling the Wi-Fi 7 (802.11be) connectivity hardware via software update via an Instagram post in the Sony Xperia channel.

The Xperia 1 VI marks the final Sony Xperia manufactured in and by Sony's Thailand and Chinese factories themselves, as its subsequent successors, the Xperia 1 VII and 1 VIII, are made in China by undisclosed OEMs. Sony Xperia 1 VI also marks the return of the red colorway (Scarlet) in Xperia devices since the original Xperia 5 and XZ Premium.

== Software ==
There is Xperia UI and Android 14 with gaming mode customizations (Game Enhancer). A unified camera app replacing the previous two separate apps (Video Pro and Photo Pro) has been added. The phone has a specialized music recording app.

The Android 15 update was released on the 20th of November 2024, which also introduced the dedicated Video Pro mode in the camera app, along with the 1st of November 2024 security patch level. It received the Android 16 update on 22 October 2025.

On its upcoming third and final Android major upgrade, Android 17, alongside its two successors, the Xperia 1 VII and Xperia 1 VIII, will receive Desktop Mode gained in Android 17 alongside a new wallpaper and style feature, an upgraded quick settings panel, and an updated screen recording.
