= Sony Xperia 10 V =

2023 Android smartphones

- Also known as: Sony Xperia 10 Mark V
- Brand: Sony
- Developer: Sony
- Manufacturer: Sony Mobile
- Type: Smartphone
- Series: Sony Xperia
- Family: Sony Xperia 10 series
- First released: 11 May 2023; 3 years ago
- Availability by region: Japan; Taiwan; Hong Kong; Singapore; Germany; United Kingdom; Austria; Malaysia; France
- Predecessor: Sony Xperia 10 IV
- Successor: Sony Xperia 10 VI
- Related: Sony Xperia 1 V Sony Xperia 5 V
- Compatible networks: 2G; 3G; 4G LTE; 5G NR
- Form factor: Slate
- Colors: Black; White; Sage Green; Lavender
- Dimensions: 155 mm (6.1 in) H 68 mm (2.7 in) W 8.3 mm (0.33 in) D
- Weight: 159 g (5.6 oz)
- Operating system: Android 13; Up to 2 major Android upgrades, 3 years of security patches, upgradable to Android 15
- System-on-chip: Qualcomm Snapdragon 695 5G
- CPU: Octa-core, 6 nm 2x2.2 GHz Cortex-A78 Kryo 660 Gold + 6x1.7 GHz Cortex-A55 Kryo 660 Silver
- GPU: Adreno 619
- Modem: Qualcomm Snapdragon X51 5G
- Memory: LPDDR4X RAM; 6 GB or 8 GB (only in Hong Kong, Japan, and Taiwan)
- Storage: Universal Flash Storage (UFS 2.1); 128 GB
- Removable storage: microSDXC, expandable up to 1 TB (shared SIM slot)
- SIM: nanoSIM, eSIM, 1 nanoSIM + 1 eSIM, 1 nanoSIM + 1 nanoSIM
- Battery: Non-removable Li-ion 5000 mAh; USB PD 3.1 21 W Charging
- Charging: Fast Charging USB PD 3.1 21 W Charging
- Rear camera: 48 MP (Sony Exmor RS IMX582), f/1.8, 26 mm (wide), 1/2.0", 0.8 μm, PDAF, OIS; 8 MP (Hynix) f/2.2, 54 mm (telephoto), 1/4.4", 1.0 μm
- Front camera: 8MP (Hynix HI846), f/2.0, 26mm (wide) (1/4.0", 1.12 μm), fixed focus 1080p@30 fps
- Display: 6.1 in (150 mm) LTPS FHD+ 21:9 (2520 x 1080) HDR10 OLED, ~449 pixel density Gorilla Glass Victus 2 HDR10
- Sound: Front stereo speakers and 3.5 mm headphone jack
- Media: Music
- Connectivity: Wi-Fi 802.11 a/b/g/n/ac (2.4/5GHz); Bluetooth 5.1; USB-C 2.0; NFC; GPS with Assisted GPS; Galileo; GLONASS; BeiDou
- Data inputs: Sensors: Accelerometer; Fingerprint scanner (side-mounted, always on); Gyroscope; Proximity sensor; Compass
- Water resistance: IP65/IP68
- Development status: Released, Discontinued
- Other: IP65/IP68 Water/dust resistant
- Website: https://centresdirect.co.uk/p-45325-xperia-10-v-super-lightweight-huge-battery-smartphone.aspx?xp=GFCD

The Sony Xperia 10 V is a midrange smartphone unveiled by Sony Mobile on 11 May 2023 alongside the halo flagship Sony Xperia 1 V. It featured the same vertical camera island that was first seen in the Sony Xperia 10 II (2020) and the last to feature it; it featured a 6.1-inch LTPS FHD+ OLED screen featuring Sony's signature 21:9 aspect ratio, powered by Qualcomm Snapdragon 695 5G coupled with either 6 or 8 GB of LPDDR4X RAM and 128 GB of UFS 2.1 storage, the same chipset and storage as its predecessor, the Sony Xperia 10 IV, but with an option of higher RAM in certain markets. The phone includes a 3.5mm headphone jack and supports expandable storage via a microSD card slot up to 1 TB. It reintroduced (front-firing) stereo speakers into the Sony mid-range devices for the first time since the Sony Xperia X and X Compact from 2016. Xperia 10 V marks the final Xperia 10 series to have a telephoto lens, as its successor, the Sony Xperia 10 VI, removed the telephoto; thus, the main camera carried the double duty as its 2x zoom.

== Hardware ==
Sony updated the main camera of the Xperia 10 V from its predecessor's 12 MP 1/2.8" IMX486 Exmor R with OIS to a bigger 48 MP 1/2.0" IMX582 Exmor RS sensor with OIS. The telephoto, ultrawide, and selfie cameras were carried from the Xperia 10 IV . It reintroduced stereo speakers in the Sony midrange lineup for the first time in 7 years since the Sony Xperia X Compact (2016); however, it removed the notification LED present on its predecessor alongside the other Xperia Mark V family. However, it keeps the 3.5 mm headphone jack since the original Xperia 10 from 2019. Due to Snapdragon 695 limitations, both the Xperia 10 IV and 10 V's video recording capabilities are capped at 1080p@30fps. Its successor, the Xperia 10 VI, restores the 4K@30fps video recording last seen in the Sony Xperia 10 III.

== Software ==
The Sony Xperia 10 V shipped with Sony's custom Xperia Home UI with Android 13 out of the box, the same as the Xperia 1 V and Xperia 5 V, with 2 OS updates and 3 years of security patches. It received the Android 14 update on 13 November 2023. Xperia 10 V received its final OS update, the Android 15 update, on 28 January 2025.
