= LTP =

LTP may refer to:

== Biology and medicine ==
- Lateral tibial plateau, part of a leg bone
- Lipid transfer proteins, proteins found in plant tissues
- Long-term potentiation (neurophysiology), a long-lasting enhancement in signal transmission between neurons
- 'The All-Species Living Tree' Project, a project to create a phylogeny of all Bacteria and Archaea

== Transportation and vehicles ==
- Local Tangent Plane, a geographical coordinate system commonly used in aviation
- Local transport plan, part of transport planning in England
- LTP tank, two different World War II-era tank designs:
  - A Czech factory designation for Panzer 38(t)
  - A Soviet light tank design by Lieutenant Provornov, never built

== Technology ==
- Long-tailed pair, a differential pair amplifier
- Linux Test Project, a body of regression tests

=== Communications ===
- Lightweight Telephony Protocol, a signaling protocol
- Licklider Transmission Protocol, a communication protocol for use in deep space links
- Long Term Prediction, a method of sound compression and quantization in mobile communications

== Other uses ==
- Lunar Transient Phenomena, a short-lived change in appearance of Earth's moon
- Leaning Tower of Pisa, a tower in the Italian city of Pisa
- Lullabies to Paralyze, an album by American hard rock band Queens of the Stone Age
- Liberia Transformation Party. a political party in Liberia

== See also ==
- LTPS (disambiguation)
- ITP (disambiguation)
