= Sony Xperia 1 VII =

2025 Android smartphone

- Also known as: Sony Xperia 1 Mark VII
- Brand: Sony
- Developer: Sony
- Manufacturer: Sony Mobile
- Type: Smartphone
- Series: Sony Xperia
- Family: Sony Xperia 1 Series
- First released: 4 June 2025; 16 months ago
- Availability by region: Japan; Taiwan; Hong Kong; Singapore; Malaysia; United Kingdom; Germany; Austria; France
- Predecessor: Sony Xperia 1 VI
- Successor: Sony Xperia 1 VIII
- Related: Sony Xperia 10 VII
- Compatible networks: 2G; 3G; 4G LTE; 5G NR
- Form factor: Slate
- Colors: Moss Green, Orchid Purple; Slate Black
- Dimensions: 162 mm (6.4 in) H 74 mm (2.9 in) W 8.2 mm (0.32 in) D
- Weight: 197 g (6.9 oz)
- Operating system: Android 15 (Upgradable to Android 17); Up to 4 major Android upgrades, 6 years of security patches
- System-on-chip: Qualcomm Snapdragon 8 Elite
- CPU: Octa-core, 3 nm (3LPE); 2x4.6 GHz Oryon V2 Phoenix L + 6x3.53 GHz Oryon V2 Phoenix M
- GPU: Adreno 830
- Modem: Qualcomm Snapdragon X80 5G
- Memory: LPDDR5X RAM; 12 GB; 16 GB
- Storage: Universal Flash Storage (UFS 4.0); 256 GB; 512 GB
- Removable storage: microSDXC, expandable up to 2 TB
- SIM: nanoSIM, eSIM
- Battery: Non-removable Li-ion 5000 mAh; USB PD 3.1 30 W Charging; Qi Wireless Charging
- Charging: Fast Charging USB PD 3.1 30 W Charging; Qi 15 W Wireless Charging
- Rear camera: 52 MP effectively used 48 MP (Sony Exmor T IMX888/Lytia LYT-800), f/1.9, 24 mm (wide), 1/1.35", 1.12 μm, Dual Pixel PDAF, OIS; 12 MP (Sony Exmor RS IMX650), f/2.3, 85 mm (telephoto), f/3.5, 170 mm (telephoto), 1/3.5", Dual Pixel PDAF, 3.5x/7.1x optical zoom, OIS; 50 MP effectively used 48 MP (Sony Exmor IMX906), f/2.0, 104˚, 16 mm (ultrawide), 1/1.56", 1.0 μm Dual Pixel PDAF; 4K@24/25/30/60/120 fps, 1080p@30/60/120 fps, Auto-framing (only main and ultrawide), HDR
- Front camera: 12 MP (Sony Exmor RS IMX663), f/2.0, 20 mm (wide) 1/2.93", 5-axis gyro-EIS, HDR Photo, Portrait selfie, Display flash, Hand and Smile Shutter 4K@30/60fps, 1080@30/60fps, HDR
- Display: 6.5 in (170 mm) LTPO FHD+ 19.5:9 (2340 x 1080) HDR OLED, ~396 pixel density Gorilla Glass Victus 2 HDR10; HLG; 10-bit color depth 120 Hz refresh rate
- Sound: Front Full-stage stereo speakers and 3.5 mm headphone jack 4 Pole; Cirrus Logic Speaker Amp x2 High-Resolution Audio; High-Resolution Audio Wireless; 360 Reality Audio hardware decoding Dolby Atmos tuned by Sony Pictures and Sony Music; DSEE Ultimate; Stereo Recording; SBC; AAC; Qualcomm aptX; Qualcomm aptX HD; Qualcomm aptX adaptive Qualcomm aptX TWS+ LDAC
- Media: Game Enhancer, Sony Pictures Core, Music
- Connectivity: Wi-Fi 802.11 a/b/g/n/ac/ax/be (2.4/5GHz); Bluetooth 6.0; USB-C 3.2 Gen 1 (supports DisplayPort); NFC; GPS with Assisted GPS; Galileo; GLONASS; BeiDou
- Data inputs: Sensors: Accelerometer; Barometer; Fingerprint scanner (side-mounted, always on); Gyroscope; Proximity sensor
- Water resistance: IP65/IP68
- Development status: Released
- Made in: China
- Other: Native Sony Alpha support IP65/IP68 Water/dust resistant PS5 Remote Play; DUALSENSE® Control compatibility Game Enhancer
- Website: https://www.sony.co.uk/smartphones/products/xperia-1m7

The Sony Xperia 1 VII is a flagship smartphone announced by Sony on May 13, 2025. It features a 6.5-inch LTPO FHD+ HDR BT.2020 OLED screen with a 19.5:9 aspect ratio, powered by the Qualcomm Snapdragon 8 Elite chipset, with an upgraded, bigger ultrawide sensor than its predecessor. The phone includes a 3.5mm headphone jack and supports expandable storage via a microSD card slot. It was succeeded by the Xperia 1 VIII on 13 May 2026, exactly 1 year after the Xperia 1 VII was unveiled.

== Hardware ==
The audio capabilities of the Xperia 1 VII have been enhanced with high-end components from Sony's Walkman audio players, including higher-quality solder in the headphone jack and support for AI-based DSEE Ultimate upscaling, Hi-Res, LDAC, and Dolby Atmos formats. The stereo speakers have also received a bass boost for improved sound quality. The Xperia 1 VII is equipped with a 5000 mAh battery and offers 256 GB or 512 GB UFS 4.0 of internal storage, paired with 12 GB or 16 GB of LPDDR5X RAM. The display technology includes adaptive brightness that adjusts based on light sensors on both the front and back of the device. The device supports Wi-Fi 7. Xperia 1 VII brings back the signature purple color of the Xperia since the Xperia 1 IV.

=== Faulty circuit board issue and replacement program ===
On 4 July 2025, Sony temporarily halted the shipment and sales of the Xperia 1 VII in its home market of Japan due to the devices either turning off by themselves, rebooting randomly, or even being unable to power on at all on the sold Xperia 1 VII and eventually globally. Sony UK provided the official update of the investigation on 9 June 2025 on the issues and is working on a solution for the faulty Xperia 1 VII batches on the European stocks. and providing guidelines on its website while the official report of its investigation is underway.

A week later, Sony announced the Sony Xperia 1 VII free replacement program for affected users of the 1 VII, as the investigation has concluded that the major issues lay in the faulty circuit board due to a manufacturing process issue, as the Xperia 1 VII was manufactured by an OEM instead of the Sony Thailand plant of its subsequent predecessors. and modifying the manufacturing process of future Xperias, preventing the same disaster taking place repeatedly. The free replacement program for 1 VII started on 21 July 2025.

On 22 August 2025, Sony confirmed the returns of the Xperia 1 VII sales on the eligible European continent starting on 25 August 2025; meanwhile, it returned to the Japanese market on 27 August 2025. Sony has apologized for the inconvenience due to the Xperia 1 VII's faulty circuit board, which committed to reinforcing the new version of its manufacturing process and quality control for the Xperia family with a different management system for the Xperia replacement units of the 1 VII and future Xperia smartphones that assess every risk and confirmation of every Xperia's manufacturing process and the quality of the product.

=== Camera ===
One of the key improvements in the Xperia 1 VII is its camera system, which includes an AI-based auto-framing mode for video recording and a 48-megapixel ultrawide lens with a sensor twice as large as the previous model (50 MP, 48 MP effective, 1/1.56" Sony Exmor RS IMX906). The ultrawide lens is designed to perform better in low-light conditions. The main camera and telephoto camera remain identical to the Xperia 1 VI. The Xperia 1 VII marks the final Xperia to have continuous optical zoom introduced in the Xperia 1 IV and updated in the Xperia 1 VI, as the successor, the Xperia 1 VIII ditched the technology for a fixed but bigger telephoto zoom lens and sensor.

Smartphone reviews have generally praised the camera and image quality of Sony Xperia 1 VII. The reviews conclude that the camera is very good, but not on par with the very best.

== Software ==
The phone comes with Android 15 with Sony's custom Xperia Home UI, with up to 4 major Android upgrades and 6 years of security updates promised, up from its predecessor, which comes with 3 major Android upgrades and 4 years of security patch updates. It received the Android 16 update in September 2025. With the upcoming Android 17 update, alongside the Xperia 1 VI and Xperia 1 VIII, the Xperia 1 VII will gain the Desktop Mode introduced in Android 17 alongside a new quick settings panel, a screen recording update, and new wallpaper and style features. On 20 October 2026, the Sony Xperia 1 VII starts receiving its second OS update, the Android 17 update in a stage rollout, where the EU version received the update first. Just like the 1 VIII, it supports Apple's AirDrop file transfer via the QuickShare feature.
