= LTPS =

LTPS or LTPs may refer to:

- Low-temperature polycrystalline silicon, a transistor type used in the flat-panel display industry
- Lawrence Township Public Schools, including Lawrence High School, United States
- Local transport plans, a part of transport planning in England
- Let the Peoples Sing, an international choral competition
- Latitudinal Temperature Probe System, an instrument in the physics experiment Borexino

== See also ==
- LTP (disambiguation), the singular of LTPs
