= Sony Xperia 10 VIII =

2026 Android smartphone

- Also known as: Sony Xperia 10 Mark VIII
- Brand: Sony Mobile
- Developer: Sony
- Manufacturer: Sony Mobile
- Type: Smartphone
- Series: Sony Xperia
- Family: Sony Xperia 10 series
- First released: 18 September 2026; 32 days ago
- Availability by region: Japan; Taiwan; Hong Kong; Germany; United Kingdom; France; Singapore; Malaysia
- Predecessor: Sony Xperia 10 VII
- Related: Sony Xperia 1 VIII
- Compatible networks: 2G; 3G; 4G LTE; 5G NR
- Form factor: Slate
- Colors: Frozen White; Frosted Grey; Misty Lilac
- Dimensions: 153 mm (6.0 in) H 72 mm (2.8 in) W 8.3 mm (0.33 in) D
- Weight: 168 g (5.9 oz)
- Operating system: Android 16; Up to 4 major Android upgrades, 6 years of security patches
- System-on-chip: Qualcomm Snapdragon 6 Gen 3
- CPU: Octa-core, 4 nm (SF4); 4x2.4 GHz Cortex-A78 + 4x1.8 GHz Cortex-A55
- GPU: Adreno 710
- Modem: Qualcomm Snapdragon X62 5G
- Memory: LPDDR5 RAM; 8 GB
- Storage: Universal Flash Storage (UFS 3.1); 128 GB
- Removable storage: microSDXC, expandable up to 2 TB (shared SIM slot)
- SIM: nanoSIM, eSIM, 1 nanoSIM + 1 eSIM, 1 nanoSIM + 1 nanoSIM
- Battery: Non-removable Li-ion 5000 mAh; USB PD 3.1 30 W Charging
- Charging: Fast Charging USB PD 3.1 30 W Charging
- Rear camera: 50 MP (Sony Exmor RS IMX766), f/1.9, 24 mm (wide), 1/1.56", 1.0 μm, multi-directional PDAF, OIS; 13 MP effectively used 12 MP (Smartsens SC1320CS), f/2.4, 120˚, 16 mm (ultrawide), 1/3.06", 1.12 μm; 4K@30 fps, 1080p@30/60/120 fps
- Front camera: 8MP (SmartSens SC820CS), f/2.0, 26mm (wide) (1/4.0", 1.12 μm), fixed focus 1080p@30 fps
- Display: 6.1 in (150 mm) LTPS FHD+ 19.5:9 (2340 x 1080) HDR10 OLED, ~422 pixel density Gorilla Glass Victus 2 HDR10; 120 Hz refresh rate
- Sound: Front stereo speakers and 3.5 mm headphone jack
- Media: Music
- Connectivity: Wi-Fi 802.11 a/b/g/n/ac/ax (2.4/5GHz); Bluetooth 5.4; USB-C 2.0; NFC; GPS with Assisted GPS; Galileo; GLONASS; BeiDou
- Data inputs: Sensors: Accelerometer; Fingerprint scanner (side-mounted, always on); Gyroscope; Proximity sensor; Compass
- Water resistance: IP65/IP68
- Development status: Released
- Made in: China
- Other: IP65/IP68 Water/dust resistant
- Website: https://www.sony.co.uk/smartphones/products/xperia-10m8

The Sony Xperia 10 VIII is a midrange smartphone unveiled by Sony on August 25, 2026, 3 months after the unveiling of their flagship, the Xperia 1 VIII. It features the same redesigned bar-like rear camera design introduced in the Xperia 10 VII from 2025 and a 6.1-inch LTPS FHD+ OLED screen with a 19.5:9 aspect ratio and 120 Hz high refresh rate, powered by the Qualcomm Snapdragon 6 Gen 3 chipset, the same chipset as its predecessor. The phone includes a 3.5mm headphone jack and supports expandable storage via a microSDXC card slot.

== Hardware ==
The Sony Xperia 10 VIII shipped with a single tier of 8 GB of LPDDR5 RAM, an upgrade from the Xperia 10 VII's LPDDR4X, with 128 GB of UFS 3.1 expandable storage, the same as its predecessor, and now featured virtual RAM up to 6 GB. The core design of the Xperia 10 VIII is the same as its previous model, including the embossed Xperia insignia on the left side frame and the same bar-like rear camera design.

=== Camera ===
The Sony Xperia 10 VIII retains the same camera setup that was first introduced in the Xperia 10 VII. It has the same wide camera (50 MP 24 mm 1/1.56" IMX766 with OIS), ultrawide lens (13 MP 16 mm 1/3.06" SC1320), and front selfie camera (8 MP 1/4.0" SC820) as its predecessor. The shutter button and its mechanism introduced in the Xperia 10 VII are also retained in the 10 VIII.

== Software ==
The Sony Xperia 10 VIII is pre-installed with Android 16, with up to 4 major Android upgrades and 6 years of security updates promised. Alongside the Xperia 10 VII, 1 VI, 1 VII, and 1 VIII, the Xperia 10 VIII will receive the Android 17 update with a new quick settings panel, updated wallpaper and style features, and upgraded screen recording. It has a new feature of "Rewards and Pay" for transaction purposes but also functions as a shortcut for other apps by pressing the power button twice, complementary to Sony's longstanding Side Sense feature from the Sony Xperia XZ3.
