= Sony Xperia 1 III =

2021 Android smartphone

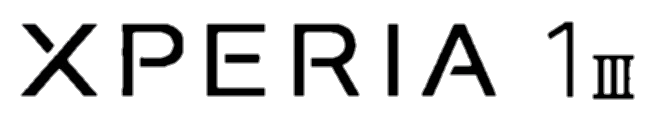

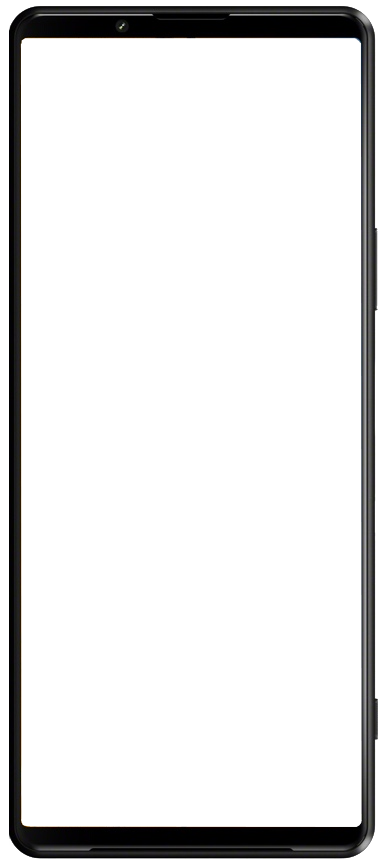
- Sony Xperia 1 III
- Also known as: Sony Xperia 1 Mark III
- Brand: Sony
- Developer: Sony
- Manufacturer: Sony Mobile
- Type: Phablet
- Series: Sony Xperia
- Family: Sony Xperia 1 Series
- First released: 1 June 2021; 5 years ago
- Availability by region: 1 June 2021; 5 years ago (China); 9 July 2021; 5 years ago (Japan; SO-51B, SOG03 and A101SO models); 15 July 2021; 5 years ago (Netherlands); 1 August 2021; 5 years ago (Singapore); 19 August 2021; 5 years ago (United Kingdom and United States); 20 August 2021; 5 years ago (Malaysia); 25 August 2021; 5 years ago (Worldwide); 19 November 2021; 4 years ago (Japan; XQ-BC42 SIM-unlocked model)
- Predecessor: Sony Xperia 1 II
- Successor: Sony Xperia 1 IV
- Related: Sony Xperia 5 III; Sony Xperia PRO-I
- Compatible networks: 2G; 3G; 4G LTE; 5G; WiMAX 2+ (SOG03 model only)
- Form factor: Slate
- Colors: Frosted Black; Frosted Gray; Frosted Purple
- Dimensions: 165 mm (6.5 in) H 71 mm (2.8 in) W 8.2 mm (0.32 in) D
- Weight: 186 g (6.6 oz)
- Operating system: Android 11 upgradeable to Android 13; 2 OS updates, 2 years of security patches
- System-on-chip: Qualcomm Snapdragon 888
- CPU: Octa-core (1x 2.84 GHz Gold Prime, 3x 2.42 GHz Gold, 4x 1.8 GHz Silver) Kryo 680
- GPU: Adreno 660
- Modem: Qualcomm Snapdragon X60 5G
- Memory: 12 GB LPDDR5 RAM
- Storage: Universal Flash Storage (UFS 3.X); 256 GB (SO-51B, SOG03 and A101SO models); 512 GB (XQ-BC42 model)
- Removable storage: microSDXC, expandable up to 1 TB
- SIM: nanoSIM + nanoSIM
- Battery: Non-removable Li-ion 4500 mAh; USB PD 3.1 30 W Charging; Qi 11 W Wireless Charging
- Charging: Fast Charging USB PD 3.1 30 W Charging; Qi 11 W Wireless Charging
- Rear camera: 12 MP (Sony Exmor RS IMX557), f/1.7, 24mm (wide), 1/1.7", 1.8 μm, Dual Pixel PDAF, OIS 12 MP (Sony Exmor RS IMX663), f/2.3, 70mm (telephoto), f/2.8, 105mm (telephoto), 1/2.9", Dual Pixel PDAF, 3x/4.4x optical zoom, OIS 12 MP (Sony Exmor RS IMX363), f/2.2, 124˚, 16mm (ultrawide), 1/2.5", Dual Pixel PDAF 0.3 MP (Sony Exmor R IMX316), TOF 3D, (depth) Zeiss optics, HDR, eye tracking 4K@24/25/30/60/120fps, 1080p@30/60/120/240fps
- Front camera: 8 MP (Samsung ISOCELL S5K4H7), f/2.0, 24mm (wide), 1/4", 1.12 μm, HDR Photo, Portrait selfie, Display flash, Hand and Smile Shutter; 1080p@30fps
- Display: 6.5 in (170 mm) 4K 21:9 (3840 x 1644) HDR OLED CinemaWide display, ~643 pixel density Gorilla Glass Victus; HDR10; HLG; 10-bit color depth 120Hz
- Sound: Front stereo speakers and 3.5 mm headphone jack 4 Pole; Cirrus Logic CS35L41 Speaker Amp x2 High-Resolution Audio; High-Resolution Audio Wireless; 360 Reality Audio hardware decoding Dolby Atmos tuned by Sony Pictures and Sony Music; DSEE Ultimate; Stereo Recording; SBC; AAC; Qualcomm aptX; Qualcomm aptX HD; Qualcomm aptX adaptive Qualcomm aptX TWS+ LDAC
- Media: Game Enhancer, Music
- Connectivity: Wi-Fi 802.11 a/b/g/n/ac/ax (2.4/5GHz); Bluetooth 5.2; USB-C 3.1 (supports DisplayPort); NFC; GPS with Assisted GPS; Galileo; GLONASS; BeiDou; Mobile FeliCa/Osaifu-Keitai (XQ-BC42, SO-51B, SOG03 and A101SO models only)
- Data inputs: Sensors: Accelerometer; Barometer; Fingerprint scanner (side-mounted, always on); Gyroscope; Proximity sensor; Colour spectrum sensor
- Water resistance: IP65/IP68
- Model: XQ-BC42 (Japan); XQ-BC52 (Europe); XQ-BC62 (Americas); XQ-BC72 (Asia Pacific); SO-51B (NTT Docomo); SOG03 (au/Okinawa Cellular); A101SO (SoftBank)
- Codename: PDX-215
- Development status: Released, Discontinued
- Made in: Thailand
- Other: IP65/IP68 Water/dust resistant PS4 Remote Play; DUALSHOCK 4 Control compatibility PS5 Remote Play; DUALSENSE® Control compatibility Game Enhancer; Dynamic Vibration System
- Website: Official website

The Sony Xperia 1 III (Note: The model's Roman numeral suffix is read "Mark III" (mark three).) is an Android smartphone manufactured by Sony. Designed to be the new flagship of Sony's Xperia series, the phone was announced along with the compact flagship Xperia 5 III and the mid-range Xperia 10 III on April 14, 2021.

== Design ==
The Xperia 1 III improves on the design used on its predecessor, the Xperia 1 II. It now features a matte frame and slightly smaller bezels all around. The phone has Corning Gorilla Glass Victus protection on the front and Corning Gorilla Glass 6 on the back with a frosted glass finish, as well as IP65 and IP68 certifications for water resistance. The build has a pair of symmetrical bezels on the top and the bottom, where the front-facing dual stereo speakers and the front camera are placed. The left side of the phone contains the SIM card tray and microSD card slot, while the right side contains a fingerprint reader embedded into the power button, a volume rocker, a customisable shortcut button, and a shutter button with an embossed finish. The rear cameras are arranged in a vertical strip like its predecessor. The phone will be available in three colors: Frosted Black, Frosted Gray, and Frosted Purple.

== Specifications ==
=== Hardware ===
The Xperia 1 III has a Qualcomm Snapdragon 888 SoC and an Adreno 660 GPU, accompanied by 12 GB of RAM, 256 GB storage space (which can be expanded up to 1 TB via the microSD card slot), and single/dual-hybrid nano-SIM card slot depending on region. The phone features a 21:9, world's first CinemaWide 4K HDR 10-bit 120Hz OLED display in a smartphone. The touch sampling rate is 240 Hz. The phone has a 4500 mAh battery, and supports 30W Fast Charging alongside Qi wireless charging with reverse wireless charging support. The phone has front-facing dual stereo speakers with support for 360 Reality Audio, which Sony claims is now 40% louder than the predecessor. There is also a 3.5 mm audio jack up top, just like its predecessor.

The Japanese carrier and SIM-unlocked versions of the Xperia 1 III support the Japanese mobile payment standard Osaifu-Keitai in conjunction with the Sony-developed mobile smart card standard Mobile FeliCa as well as regular NFC, however, unlike the vast majority of carrier-branded flagship Android phones sold in Japan up to that point, the Xperia 1 III does not support the 1seg mobile television standard.

=== Camera ===
The phone has a triple 12 MP camera setup and a 3D iToF sensor on the back, and an 8 MP camera on the front. The rear cameras comprise the main lens (24 mm f/1.7), the ultrawide angle lens (16 mm f/2.2), and the world's first variable periscope telephoto lens that can switch between 70 mm and 105 mm; all of which use ZEISS' T✻ (T-Star) anti-reflective coating. Digital zoom can now reach the equivalent of 300 mm, compared to 200 mm on the Xperia 1 II and 5 II with a new enhanced algorithm which Sony calls “AI super resolution zoom”. The phone still has support for 4K video recording for up to 120 FPS and 2K for up to 120 FPS like its predecessor. Sony introduced “Realtime Tracking” which now allows users to tap on a subject and have the phone continuously track it without ever losing focus of what is important.

=== Software ===
The Xperia 1 III runs on Android 11. It is also equipped with a “Photo Pro” mode developed by Sony's camera division α (Alpha) and a “Cinema Pro” mode developed by Sony's cinematography division CineAlta, just like its predecessor. The old camera app has been integrated with “Photo Pro” and was renamed as “Basic Mode”. Updates are provided for two years.

== Color ==
Color	Name
	Frosted Gray
	Frosted Purple
	Frosted Black

== Reception ==
The Xperia 1 III has been described by Engadget as a “love letter to photography nerds” because of its camera features.
