= LTP (tank) =

- Type: Light tank
- Place of origin: USSR

Service history
- In service: Never in Service; Blueprint Tank

Production history
- Designer: Lieutenant K.J. Provornov
- Designed: July 1942
- Unit cost: Classified
- No. built: Classified

Specifications
- Mass: 13 t (13 long tons)
- Length: 4 m (13 ft 1 in)
- Width: 2 m (6 ft 7 in)
- Height: 1.9 m (6 ft 3 in)
- Crew: 4 (Commander, Gunner, Driver, and Loader)
- Main armament: 45 mm 20KL
- Engine: M-80; 170 hp
- Power/weight: 15.45 hp/tonne
- Suspension: Unknown, presumably caterpillar
- Maximum speed: 45.1 km/h (28.0 mph)

The Legkij Tank Provornova (LTP) is a light tank designed by Lieutenant K. J. Provornov in July 1942. Blueprints for the LTP were discovered in the Main Automotive-Armoured Directorate of the Ministry of Defence of the Russian Federation inventions department, but no prototypes have ever been made.

== See also ==
- Spähpanzer SP I.C.
- T-46 (tank)
- Tanks in World War II
