= Sony Xperia 1 VIII =

2026 Android smartphone

- Also known as: Sony Xperia 1 Mark VIII
- Developer: Sony
- Manufacturer: Sony Mobile
- Type: Smartphone
- Series: Xperia
- Family: Sony Xperia 1 Series
- First released: 19 June 2026; 4 months ago
- Availability by region: Japan; United Kingdom; Taiwan; Hong Kong; Germany; Austria; Singapore; Malaysia
- Predecessor: Sony Xperia 1 VII
- Related: Sony Xperia 10 VIII
- Compatible networks: 2G; 3G; 4G LTE; 5G NR
- Form factor: Slate
- Colors: Graphite Black; Iolite Silver; Garnet Red; Native Gold (only 16/1 TB configuration)
- Dimensions: 162 mm (6.4 in) H 74 mm (2.9 in) W 8.3 mm (0.33 in) D
- Weight: 200 g (7.1 oz)
- Operating system: Android 16, upgradable to Android 17; Up to 4 major Android upgrades, 6 years of security patches
- System-on-chip: Qualcomm Snapdragon 8 Elite Gen 5
- CPU: Octa-core, 3 nm (3LPE); 2x4.32 GHz Oryon V3 Phoenix L + 6x3.62 GHz Oryon V3 Phoenix M
- GPU: Adreno 840
- Modem: Qualcomm Snapdragon X85 5G
- Memory: LPDDR5X RAM; 12 GB; 16 GB
- Storage: Universal Flash Storage (UFS 4.1); 256 GB; 512 GB; 1 TB (Only Native Gold)
- Removable storage: microSDXC, expandable up to 2 TB (dedicated slot)
- SIM: nanoSIM, eSIM, 1 nanoSIM + 1 eSIM
- Battery: Non-removable Li-ion 5000 mAh; USB PD 3.1 30 W Charging; Qi Wireless Charging
- Charging: Fast Charging USB PD 3.1 30 W Charging; Qi 15 W Wireless Charging
- Rear camera: 52 MP effectively used 48 MP (Sony Exmor T IMX888/Lytia LYT-800), f/1.9, 24 mm (wide), 1/1.35", 1.12 μm, Dual Pixel PDAF, OIS; 50 MP effectively used 48 MP (Sony Exmor RS IMX906), f/2.8, 70 mm (periscope telephoto), 1/1.56", 1.0 μm Dual Pixel PDAF, 2.9x optical zoom, 5.8x hybrid zoom OIS; 50 MP effectively used 48 MP (Sony Exmor IMX906), f/2.0, 104˚, 16 mm (ultrawide), 1/1.56", 1.0 μm, Dual Pixel PDAF; Zeiss Optics, HDR, eye-tracking, Zeiss T* lens coating 4K@24/25/30/60/120 fps, 1080p@30/60/120 fps, Auto-framing
- Front camera: 12 MP (Sony Exmor RS IMX663), f/2.0, 20 mm (wide) 1/2.93", 5-axis gyro-EIS, HDR Photo, Portrait selfie, Display flash, Hand and Smile Shutter; 4K@30/60fps, 1080@30/60fps, HDR
- Display: 6.5 in (170 mm) LTPO FHD+ 19.5:9 (2340 x 1080) HDR OLED, ~396 pixel density Gorilla Glass Victus 2 HDR10; HLG; 10-bit color depth 120 Hz refresh rate
- Sound: Front Full-stage stereo speakers and 3.5 mm headphone jack 4 Pole; Cirrus Logic Speaker Amp x2 High-Resolution Audio; High-Resolution Audio Wireless; 360 Reality Audio hardware decoding Dolby Atmos tuned by Sony Pictures and Sony Music; DSEE Ultimate; Stereo Recording; SBC; AAC; Qualcomm aptX; Qualcomm aptX HD; Qualcomm aptX adaptive Qualcomm aptX TWS+ LDAC
- Media: Game Enhancer, Sony Pictures Core, Music, Video Creator App
- Connectivity: Wi-Fi 802.11 a/b/g/n/ac/ax/be (2.4/5GHz); Bluetooth 6.0; USB-C 3.2 Gen 1 (supports DisplayPort); NFC; GPS with Assisted GPS; Galileo; GLONASS; BeiDou
- Data inputs: Sensors: Accelerometer; Barometer; Fingerprint scanner (side-mounted, always on); Gyroscope; Proximity sensor; Compass
- Water resistance: IP65/IP68 water and dust resistant
- Development status: Released
- Made in: China
- Other: Native Sony Alpha support IP65/IP68 Water/dust resistant PS5 Remote Play; DUALSENSE® Control compatibility Game Enhancer
- Website: https://www.sony.co.uk/smartphones/products/xperia-1m8

The Sony Xperia 1 VIII is a flagship smartphone unveiled by Sony on May 13, 2026. It features a redesigned rear camera design for the first time since the original Xperia 1 (2019), a new, bigger periscope telephoto sensor and lens, and a 6.5-inch LTPO FHD+ HDR BT.2020 OLED screen with a 19.5:9 aspect ratio, powered by the Qualcomm Snapdragon 8 Elite Gen 5 chipset. The phone includes a 3.5 mm headphone jack and supports expandable storage via a microSD card slot.

== Hardware ==
The Sony Xperia 1 VIII marks the first flagship Xperia since the Xperia Z5 series and the first Xperia overall since the Xperia 10 Plus and Xperia L3 to have a dedicated MicroSDXC card slot, up to 2 TB, as the secondary SIM is now exclusively in eSIM form instead of their predecessor's having both eSIM and/or physical nanoSIM. Xperia 1 VIII also marks the return of the gold colorway since the Z5 series (for flagship Xperia) and 10 Plus/L3 (for overall Xperia), albeit exclusive to the 16GB RAM/1 TB configuration. The Xperia insignia embossed on its left side frame also marks a return to the flagship series since the Xperia Z5 series as well. The front glass and display are covered by Gorilla Glass Victus 2, the frame is made from aluminum alloy with new "Ore" finishing, and the back panel is made of Gorilla Glass Victus 1 with the same "Ore" back finish. It also brings back the red colorway last seen in the Sony Xperia 1 VI. It has a 3.5 mm headphone jack on the top of the device, with the same technology implemented since the Xperia 1 VII (with gold plating and in collaboration with Sony Walkman).

=== Camera ===
Xperia 1 VIII removed the continuous optical zoom technology that was introduced in the Xperia 1 IV and extended its zoom range in the Xperia 1 VI in favor of a fixed, however bigger, telephoto sensor at 48 megapixels, at a 1/1.56" size of Exmor RS IMX906 sensor, four times bigger than its predecessor, to design better performance in low-light scenarios. The ultrawide, main camera, and selfie camera sensors were carried out from the Xperia 1 VII. Due to the bigger, larger telephoto lens and its accommodation to place the new module, Sony Xperia 1 VIII introduced the redesigned camera island, from the vertical type of its subsequent predecessors, into a squared camera island akin to the OnePlus 10 Pro and Samsung Galaxy S21 Ultra.

=== AI Camera Assistant Controversy ===
Xperia 1 VIII was subjected to controversy due to overly bright, flat images and washed-out color by its AI Camera Assistant feature introduced in the 1 VIII as its highlight feature. Sony addressed this controversy with follow-up posts and during interviews conducted by IT Media on the Xperia 1 VIII sale success in the European market. AI Camera Assistant feature got an upgrade in Android 17 with the introduction of up to three custom looks.

== Software ==
The phone shipped with Android 16 with Sony's custom-yet-near-stock Xperia Home UI that was revamped from the original Xperia 1 (2019), with up to 4 major Android upgrades, up to Android 20, and 6 years of security updates promised until 2032. On 7 September 2026, it received its first out of four major Android updates, Android 17, where it introduced Desktop Mode alongside its two predecessors, the Xperia 1 VI and Xperia 1 VII; updated wallpaper and style features; a new quick settings panel; upgraded screen recording; and an upgraded AI Camera Assistant, where it now provides up to three custom looks, an exclusive feature to the Xperia 1 VIII. Android 17 updates also unlocked 1 VIII's support for Apple's AirDrop share via the QuickShare feature.
