= T-46 (tank) =

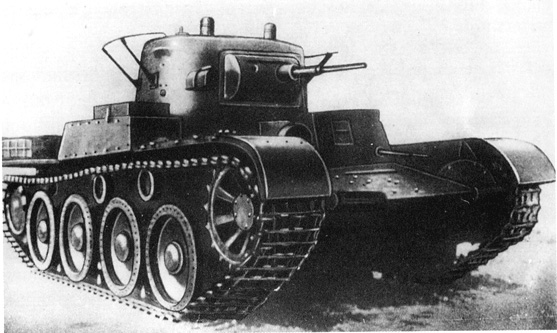
- T-46
- Type: Light tank
- Place of origin: Soviet Union

Service history
- Used by: Soviet Union

Production history
- Designer: OKMO team
- Designed: 1935
- Manufacturer: Zavod No.185
- Produced: 1936
- No. built: 4
- Variants: T-46, T-46S, T-46-1

Specifications
- Mass: 18-19 tonnes
- Length: 5.5 m (18 ft 1 in)
- Width: 2.33 m (7 ft 7.7 in)
- Height: 2.29 m (7 ft 6 in)
- Crew: 3
- Armor: 15 mm
- Main armament: 45 mm L/46
- Secondary armament: 7.62 mm MG
- Engine: GAZ T-26 8 cylinder petrol Approximately 90 hp
- Power/weight: 8,74 hp/tonne
- Suspension: Christie
- Operational range: 500 km
- Maximum speed: 60 km/h

The T-46 was a Soviet fast light tank developed in 1935, as an improvement to the earlier T-26. The design was later discarded by the government, after the prototypes were built and tested. The project ended up being too expensive and a poor design. The thin armor, bulky hull and small main gun put the crew in great danger, which made the tank unsuitable for use in combat.

== History ==
The Soviet T-46, began as an improvement to the T-26. The T46 served the same purpose as the T26, but it was quite different. It was a fast and lightly armored tank. It could reach speeds of up to 50 km/h with relative ease. The T-26 suspension consisted of eight small road wheels carried in pairs on small bogies. The bogies were supported in pairs by leaf springs. This was a much less effective system than the Christie suspension, which had a more advanced, yet more expensive system to maintain and produce. This is the reason why the OKMO team at Zavod No.185 was ordered by the Government of Soviet Union to produce an improved version of the fast light-tank, T-26. Yet the design of the T-46 proved too expensive, compared to the final performance of the vehicle, to mass-produce it. Its thin armor, small main armament and the bulky, big design of tank, made the government of Soviet Union cancel the project.

Some T-46's may have seen combat in Finland.
