= Eye autofocus =

Eye autofocus may refer to:

- Face detection system used to focus on the subject's eyes
- Eye-controlled focusing, where focusing is controlled by the photographer's eyes
- Eye tracking is the process of measuring either the point of gaze or the motion of an eye relative to the head
