= Sony Xperia 10 III =

Android smartphone

- Also known as: Sony Xperia 10 Mark III
- Brand: Sony
- Manufacturer: Sony Mobile
- Type: Smartphone
- Series: Sony Xperia
- Family: Sony Xperia 10 series
- First released: 14 April 2021; 5 years ago
- Availability by region: Xperia 10 III: 11 June 2021; 5 years ago (United Kingdom, Germany); 18 June 2021; 5 years ago (Japan; SO-52B and SOG04 models); 2 July 2021; 5 years ago (Japan; A102SO model); Xperia 10 III Lite: 27 August 2021; 5 years ago (Japan; Rakuten Mobile and SIM-unlocked)
- Predecessor: Sony Xperia 10 II
- Successor: Sony Xperia 10 IV
- Related: Sony Xperia 1 III; Sony Xperia 5 III
- Compatible networks: 2G; 3G; 4G LTE; 5G; WiMAX 2+ (SOG04 model only)
- Form factor: Slate
- Colors: Black; White; Blue; Pink; Yellow (NTT Docomo Japan Exclusive)
- Dimensions: 154 mm (6.1 in) H 68 mm (2.7 in) W 8.3 mm (0.33 in) D
- Weight: 169 g (6.0 oz)
- Operating system: Android 11, upgradable to Android 13; 2 OS updates, 2 years of security patches
- System-on-chip: Qualcomm Snapdragon 690 5G
- CPU: Octa-core (2 × 2.0 GHz Kryo 560 Gold + 6 × 1.7 GHz Kryo 560 Silver)
- GPU: Adreno 619L
- Modem: Qualcomm Snapdragon X51 5G
- Memory: 6 GB LPDDR4X RAM
- Storage: Universal Flash Storage (UFS); Xperia 10 III Lite: 64 GB; Xperia 10 III: 128 GB
- Removable storage: microSD, expandable up to 1 TB
- SIM: nanoSIM eSIM (only in Xperia 10 III Lite)
- Battery: Non-removable 4500 mAh; USB PD 30 W Charging
- Charging: Fast Charging PD 3.1 30 W
- Rear camera: 12 Mpx 1/2.8" f/1.8, 27 mm (wide) + 8 Mpx 1/4" f/2.4, 54 mm (telephoto) + 8 Mpx 1/4" f/2.2, 16 mm (ultrawide), PDAF, LED flash, HDR, panorama, 4K @ 30 fps, 1080p @ 60 fps
- Front camera: 8 Mpx, f/2.0, 24 mm (wide), 1/4", 1.0 μm, 1080p @ 30 fps
- Display: 6 in (150 mm) 1080p (2520 × 1080) HDR OLED, 457 px/in, Gorilla Glass 6
- Sound: Loudspeaker, 3.5 mm headphone jack
- Media: Music
- Connectivity: Wi-Fi 802.11 a/b/g/n/ac (2.4/5 GHz); Bluetooth 5.1; USB-C (supports DisplayPort); NFC; GPS with Assisted GPS; GLONASS; Mobile FeliCa/Osaifu-Keitai (XQ-BT44, SO-52B, SOG04 and A102SO models only)
- Data inputs: Sensors: Accelerometer; Barometer; Fingerprint scanner (side-mounted, always on); Proximity sensor
- Water resistance: IP65/68
- Model: Xperia 10 III: XQ-BT52; SO-52B (NTT Docomo); SOG04 (au/Okinawa Cellular); A102SO (Y!Mobile); Xperia 10 III Lite: XQ-BT44
- Codename: PDX-213
- Development status: Released, Discontinued
- Website: Official website

The Sony Xperia 10 III (Note: The model's Roman numeral suffix is pronounced Mark III ("mark three").) is a mid-range Android smartphone manufactured by Sony Mobile. Part of Sony's Xperia series, it was unveiled alongside the Xperia 1 III & Xperia 5 III on April 14, 2021. It is the Sony's first Xperia mid-ranger to support 5G network.

== Design ==
The Xperia 10 III has a plastic frame and Corning Glass 6 for the screen and back panel. The earpiece, front-facing camera, notification LED, and various sensors are housed in the top bezel, while the single front-firing speakers are housed in the bottom bezel. The bezels have been trimmed more than on the Xperia 10 II, resulting in the Xperia 10 III being more compact in dimension. The power button/fingerprint sensor, a dedicated Google Assistant button, and volume rocker are located on the right side of the device, while the 3.5 mm headphone jack is located on the top. The rear cameras are located at the upper left-hand corner of the phone, with the LED flash above. The bottom edge has the primary microphone and a USB-C port. It is rated IP65/IP68 dust/water-proof up to 1.5 meters for 30 minutes. Black, white, blue, and pink were the colours available at launch. An exclusive Yellow colour was released in Japan by NTT Docomo Mobile Network .

== Specifications ==
=== Hardware ===
The device is powered by the Qualcomm Snapdragon 690 5G SoC and the Adreno 619L GPU. It is available with 6 GB of LPDDR4X RAM and 64 GB (Xperia 10 III Lite only) or 128 GB of UFS 2.1 storage, up from its predecessor's 4 GB of LPDDR4X RAM and 64/128 GB eMMC 5.1 storage. MicroSD card expansion is supported up to 1 TB with a single-SIM or hybrid dual-SIM setup. The display is the same panel, size, and resolution as the 10 II, using a 6-inch (150 mm) 21:9 1080p (1080 × 2520) OLED display, which results in a pixel density of 457 ppi, but now with the addition of HDR10 support. The 10 III has a 4500 mAh battery, an increase of 25% over its predecessor, which can be recharged at up to 30 W via the USB-C port. A triple camera setup is present on the rear, with a 12 MP primary sensor with PDAF, now supporting 10 fps AE burst mode and a brighter aperture at f/1.8, an 8 MP telephoto sensor, and an 8 MP ultrawide sensor. The front-facing camera has an 8 MP sensor. Sony Xperia 10 III was the last Xperia 10 series to support 4K@30fps video recording until the capability was restored in the Sony Xperia 10 VI 3 years later.

=== Software ===
The Xperia 10 III runs on Android 11 at launch and an update to Android 12, then updated once more to Android 13, which is available by OTA. It has a Side Sense bar shortcut on the side of the phone's display to launch a menu of shortcuts to apps and features since the Xperia XZ3, now with the addition of a widget to control the Sony headphones app.

The Xperia 10 III can also run Sailfish OS and is officially supported by Jolla.

== Notes ==
Preceded by Sony Xperia 10 II	Sony Xperia 10 III; 2021	Succeeded by Sony Xperia 10 IV
