= Sony Xperia 1 IV =

2022 Android smartphone

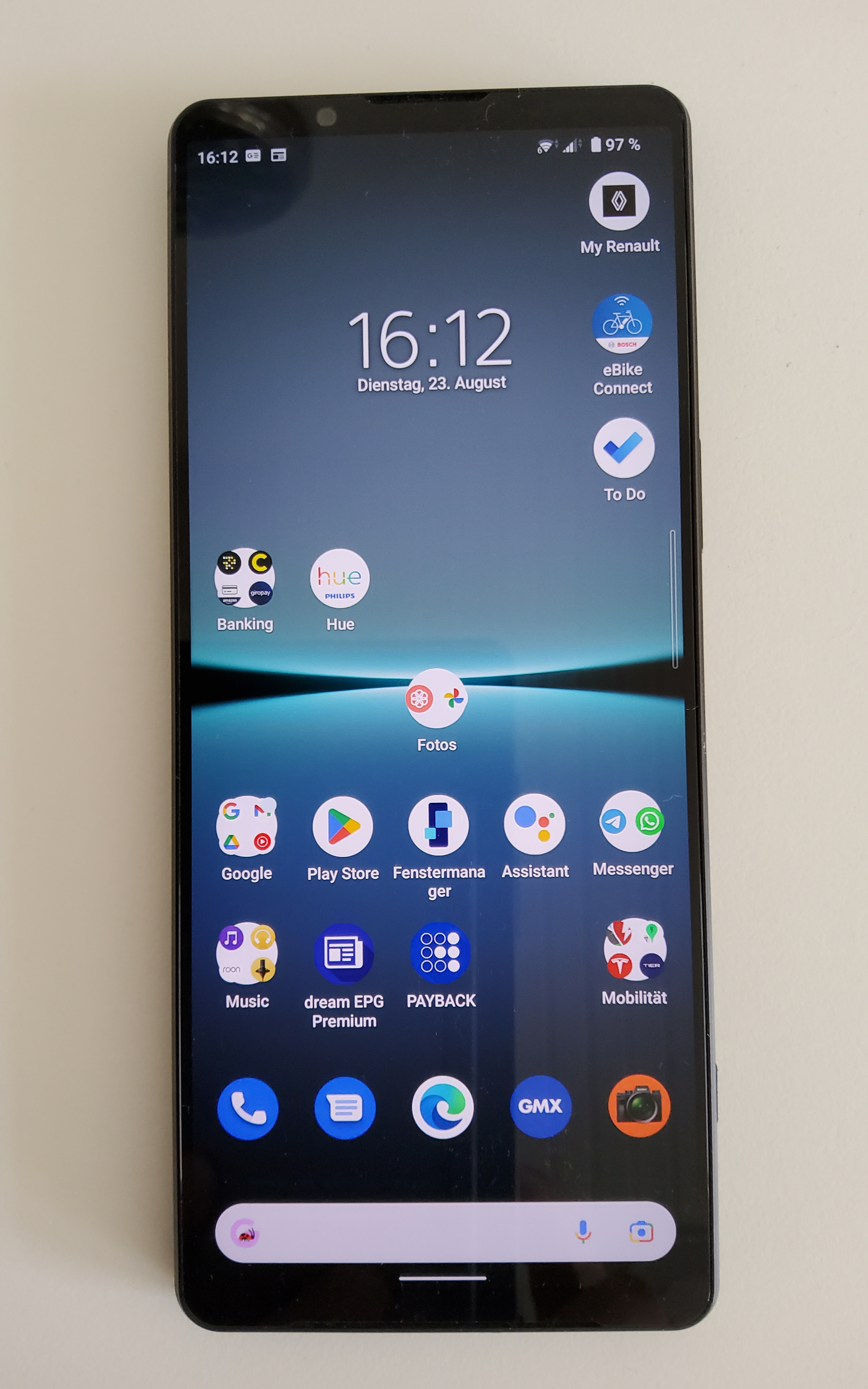
- Also known as: Sony Xperia 1 Mark IV
- Brand: Sony
- Manufacturer: Sony Corporation
- Type: Phablet
- Series: Sony Xperia
- Family: Sony Xperia 1 Series
- First released: 1 June 2022; 4 years ago
- Availability by region: 1 June 2022; 4 years ago (China); 3 June 2022; 4 years ago (Japan; SO-51C, SOG06 and A201SO models); 11 June 2022; 4 years ago (Malaysia); 16 June 2022; 4 years ago (United Kingdom); 1 July 2022; 4 years ago (Singapore); 1 September 2022; 4 years ago (United States); 16 September 2022; 3 years ago (Japan; XQ-CT44 SIM-unlocked model)
- Predecessor: Sony Xperia 1 III
- Successor: Sony Xperia 1 V
- Related: Sony Xperia 5 IV; Sony Xperia 10 IV
- Compatible networks: 2G; 3G; 4G LTE; 5G; WiMAX 2+ (SOG06 model only)
- Form factor: Slate
- Colors: Black; Violet; White
- Dimensions: 165 mm (6.5 in) H 71 mm (2.8 in) W 8.2 mm (0.32 in) D
- Weight: 185 g (6.5 oz)
- Operating system: Android 12 (Upgradable to Android 14); 2 OS updates, 3 years of security patches
- System-on-chip: Qualcomm Snapdragon 8 Gen 1 (SM8450)
- CPU: Octa-core, 4 nm (4LPE); 1x 3.00 GHz Kryo Prime (ARM Cortex-X2-based); 3x 2.40 GHz Kryo Gold (ARM Cortex-A710-based); 4x 1.7 GHz Kryo Silver (ARM Cortex-A510-based)
- GPU: Adreno 730
- Modem: Qualcomm Snapdragon X65 5G
- Memory: LPDDR5 RAM; 12 GB (SO-51C, SOG06 and A201SO models); 16 GB (XQ-CT44 model)
- Storage: Universal Flash Storage (UFS 3.1); 256 GB (SO-51C, SOG06 and A201SO models); 512 GB (XQ-CT44 model)
- Removable storage: microSDXC, expandable up to 1 TB
- SIM: eSIM + nanoSIM nanoSIM + nanoSIM
- Battery: Non-removable Li-ion 5000 mAh; USB PD 3.1 30 W Charging; Qi Wireless Charging
- Charging: Fast Charging USB PD 3.1 30 W Charging; Qi 11 W Wireless Charging
- Rear camera: 12 MP (Sony Exmor RS IMX557), f/1.7, 24 mm (wide), 1/1.7", 1.8 μm, Dual Pixel PDAF, OIS 12 MP (Sony Exmor RS IMX650), f/2.3, 85 mm (telephoto), f/2.8, 125 mm (telephoto), 1/3.5", Dual Pixel PDAF, 3.5x/5.2x optical zoom, OIS 12 MP (Sony Exmor RS IMX563), f/2.2, 124˚, 16 mm (ultrawide), 1/2.55", Dual Pixel PDAF 0.3 MP (Sony Exmor R IMX316), TOF 3D, (depth); Zeiss optics, HDR, eye tracking 4K@24/25/30/60/120 fps, 1080p@30/60/120 fps, HDR
- Front camera: 12 MP (Sony Exmor RS IMX663), f/2.0, 20 mm (wide), 1/2.9", 1.0 μm, HDR Photo, Portrait selfie, Display flash, Hand and Smile Shutter; 4K@30fps, 1080p@30/60fps
- Display: 6.5 in (170 mm) 4K 21:9 (3840 x 1644) HDR OLED CinemaWide display, ~643 pixel density Gorilla Glass Victus; HDR10; HLG; 10-bit color depth 120 Hz
- Sound: Front stereo speakers and 3.5 mm headphone jack 4 Pole; Cirrus Logic Speaker Amp x2 High-Resolution Audio; High-Resolution Audio Wireless; 360 Reality Audio hardware decoding Dolby Atmos tuned by Sony Pictures and Sony Music; DSEE Ultimate; Stereo Recording; SBC; AAC; Qualcomm aptX; Qualcomm aptX HD; Qualcomm aptX adaptive Qualcomm aptX TWS+ LDAC
- Media: Music, Game Enhancer, Sony Pictures Core
- Connectivity: Wi-Fi 802.11 a/b/g/n/ac/ax (2.4/5GHz); Bluetooth 5.2; USB-C (supports DisplayPort); NFC; GPS with Assisted GPS; Galileo; GLONASS; BeiDou; Mobile FeliCa/Osaifu-Keitai (XQ-CT44, SO-51C, SOG06 and A201SO models only)
- Data inputs: Sensors: Accelerometer; Barometer; Fingerprint scanner (side-mounted, always on); Gyroscope; Proximity sensor; Colour spectrum sensor
- Water resistance: IP65/IP68 Water/dust resistant
- Model: XQ-CT44 (factory unlock; Japan); XQ-CT54 (single SIM) (United Kingdom); XQ-CT62 (dual SIM) (United States); XQ-CT72 (dual SIM) (Asia) (Europe); SO-51C (NTT Docomo; Japan); SOG06 (au/Okinawa Cellular; Japan); A201SO (SoftBank; Japan)
- Codename: taro
- Development status: Released, Discontinued
- Made in: Thailand
- Other: IP65/IP68 Water/dust resistant Native Sony Alpha camera support DUALSHOCK Control compatibility Game Enhancer; Dynamic Vibration System
- Website: Official website

The Sony Xperia 1 IV (Note: The model's Roman numeral suffix is read "Mark IV" (mark four).) is an Android smartphone manufactured by Sony. Launched on May 11, 2022, it succeeds the Xperia 1 III as the latest flagship of Sony's Xperia series. The device was announced along with the mid-range Xperia 10 IV, with expected release dates by June 2022 (Asian markets) and as late as September 2022 for other markets, including the US. US shipments were delayed and ultimately began in late October 2022.

== Design ==
The Xperia 1 IV is designed with more professionalism in mind, while improving on the now-signature designs of its predecessors, the Xperia 1 II and Xperia 1 III. It features a grippier matte frame and rear frosted glass finish akin to the Xperia PRO-I, and a boxier design than the previous flagships. The phone has Corning Gorilla Glass Victus protection both on the front and the back, as well as IP65 and IP68 certifications for water resistance.

The display still has symmetrical bezels on the top and the bottom, a hallmark Xperia design, where the front-facing dual stereo speakers and the front camera are placed. The left side of the phone is completely devoid of any controls or ports, with only antenna bands present. The microSD/SIM card combo tray now found at the bottom (or right-side if placed in landscape) along with the USB-C 3.2 port and the primary microphone, while the right side contains the fingerprint reader embedded into the power button, a volume rocker, and a dedicated 2-stage shutter button with an embossed finish, the previously included customisable shortcut button from the Mark 3 omitted. Xperia 1 IV is also the last Xperia 1 series to feature LED notification light, as Xperia 1 V removed the feature the following year.

The rear cameras are arranged in a vertical strip like its predecessor, with the LED flash and color spectrum sensor along the top. The phone will be available in three colors: Black, White, and Purple, with only Black and Purple being available in the North American market.

== Specifications ==
=== Hardware ===
The Xperia 1 IV is powered by the 4 nm (4LPE) Qualcomm Snapdragon 8 Gen 1 SoC and an Adreno 730 GPU, accompanied by 12 GB of LPDDR5 RAM, 256 GB or 512 GB storage space (expandable up to 1 TB), and single/dual-hybrid nano-SIM card slot depending on region. The phone features a 21:9 4K CinemaWide HDR 10-bit 120 Hz OLED display first seen in the Xperia 1 III, now improved with 50% more brightness. The Xperia 1 IV's touch sampling rate is 240 Hz. The phone has a larger 5000 mAh battery (from 4500 mAh of the 1 III), and supports 30 W Fast Charging alongside Qi wireless charging with reverse wireless charging support. The phone has front-facing dual stereo speakers with redesigned drivers, and support for 360 Reality Audio. There is also a 3.5 mm stereo audio jack with support for both high-resolution audio output and microphone input for plugged in peripherals such as an external microphone for vlogging.

=== Camera ===
The Xperia 1 IV has an improved triple camera setup from the 1 III. All three cameras are still 12 Megapixels, but sporting new sensors and optics for the ultrawide and telephoto. They consist of the main 12 MP Exmor RS IMX557 sensor behind a 24 mm f/1.7 lens with optical image stabilization (OIS), an ultrawide 12MP IMX563 sensor with 16 mm f/2.2 lens, both of which have phase-detection autofocus, and a 0.3 MP IMX316 3D TOF depth sensor. The latter is also the final time it was included in any Sony Xperia device, as Xperia 1 V removes the 3D TOF depth sensor and RGBC-IR sensor as well.

The highlight of the 1 IV is its continuous zoom telephoto lens, a major improvement over its predecessor's variable zoom telephoto. It is a 12 MP 1/3.5" sensor with 1.0 μm pixels and PDAF, contained in the same periscope design like the 1 III, it can now zoom between 85 mm and 125 mm without any stepping or using digital zoom, just like a true digital camera. There is no confirm detail on the specific Sony IMX sensor used on the telephoto, other than some insights by independent reviewers such as GSMArena where they've discovered that it is “presumably” an IMX650, a 40-MP sensor with a 1/1.7-inch optical format that was last used on the Huawei P30 and P30 Pro smartphones. Whether this is true, either implementing the same 12-MP crop as the Xperia PRO-I on the IMX650, or the hardware information app HWiNFO used could be reporting incorrect data (which according to Notebookcheck seems unlikely), or if it's using a new or unknown IMX sensor altogether, remains to be seen.

All 3 cameras of the 1 IV use ZEISS T✻ (T-Star) anti-reflective coating on each lens and has support for 4K video recording up to 120 FPS and 2K for up to 120 FPS like its predecessors, and it improves on the 20 FPS burst feature where it is now available on all 3 cameras. Digital zoom on the main camera can reach the equivalent of 300 mm with the "AI super resolution zoom" first featured on the 1 III. It also has improved Realtime Tracking with enhanced Eye AF for human, animals and birds, instantly locking focus on the subject's eyes without losing track upon sudden loss of focus from the frame.

For the first time, a new 12 MP front-facing camera with support for 4K video recording is present in the 1 IV. Surprisingly, it is the Sony IMX663 (in place of the previous Samsung ISOCELL sensor), the same sensor that was first used as the telephoto sensor for the Xperia 1 III and the Xperia PRO-I, making it on-par with the likes of Google's Pixel 6 Pro smartphone and marking another improvement over its predecessors' outdated 8 MP-resolution front cameras.

=== Software ===
The Xperia 1 IV runs on the latest Android 12, with promise for 2 major Android software revisions and 3 years of software support. It is also equipped with 3 different camera apps specifically made to take advantage of the 1 IV's camera hardware: “Photo Pro”, developed by Sony's α (Alpha) camera division, focuses on the full manual control setup and configuration commonly seen on Sony Alpha line of professional cameras; the professional movie-oriented “Cinema Pro”, developed by Sony's cinematography division CineAlta, and the “Basic Mode” first seen on the 1 III, replacing the stock camera app but with additional controls from the “Photo Pro”.

== See also ==
- List of longest smartphone telephoto lenses
