= Sony Xperia XA series =

Android-based smartphone line from Sony

The Sony Xperia XA series refers to a line of mid-range Android-based smartphones and phablets developed by Sony Corporation from 2016 to 2018 and is a branch of Sony Xperia X series. The original Sony Xperia XA was announced in February 2016 at MWC 2016 within the Sony Xperia X series.

All of devices in this line have IPS LCD displays, microSD card support, headphone jack, non-removable batteries and 64-bit octa-core processors and all except the Xperia XA and Xperia XA Ultra have the same 23 MP main camera. Xperia XA is the only single-SIM device in this line. All of these devices except Xperia XA2 family have 1080p video recording cameras.

== The original Xperia XA family ==
These devices come with MT6755 Helio P10 chipset and 16 GB of storage and have the same design language from Sony Xperia X and were launched with Android 6.0 Marshmallow and can be upgraded to Android 7.0 Nougat.

=== Xperia XA ===
The Xperia XA has a 5.0-inch HD display, 13 MP main camera and an 8 MP selfie camera with 2 GB of RAM. It won iF Design Award 2017 and Red Dot Award 2017.

=== Xperia XA Ultra ===
The first phablet in the series announced in May 2016 and comes with a 6.0-inch full-HD display, a 21 MP main camera, a 16 MP secondary camera and 3 GB of RAM.

== Xperia XA1 family ==
These devices use newer design language named Loop Surface and have upgraded chipset namely MT6757 Helio P20 and are shipped with Android 7.0 Nougat with an update to Android 8.0 Oreo and are first devices in this line to have USB-type C. The Xperia XA1 and XA1 Ultra was announced in Feb 2017.

=== Xperia XA1 ===
The Xperia XA1 comes with the same display as Xperia XA, 32 GB of storage, 3 GB of RAM and 8 MP selfie camera.

=== Xperia XA1 Ultra ===
With the same display as the Xperia XA Ultra, Xperia XA1 Ultra has 4 GB of RAM and 16 MP selfie camera. It has two storage options including 32 GB and 64 GB.

=== Xperia XA1 Plus ===
The Xperia XA1 Plus -announced in Aug 2017- has a 5.5-inch full-HD display, 32 GB of storage, 3/4 GB of RAM and an 8 MP selfie camera. This is the first device in the Xperia XA line that has fingerprint sensor.

== Xperia XA2 family ==
Announced in Jan 2018, these devices have newer design and fingerprint sensor in rear and have upgraded chipset Snapdragon 630. All have shipped with Android 8.0 Oreo and are the first in this series that have 4K recording cameras. These are the first Sony Xperia devices that have rear-mounted fingerprint sensors instead of side-mounted ones.

=== Xperia XA2 ===
It has 5.2" Full-HD display, 32 GB of internal storage, 3 GB of RAM and 8 MP selfie camera.

=== Xperia XA2 Ultra ===
The latest phablet in the series comes with a 6-inch full-HD display, 32/64 GB of internal storage, 4 GB of RAM and dual 16 MP + 8 MP selfie camera. This is the first Sony Xperia device that has dual cameras.

=== Xperia XA2 Plus ===
The Sony Xperia XA2 is a 6-inch phone with a 1080×1920p display. The Snapdragon 630 is paired with 3 GB of RAM and 32 GB of storage. The main camera is 23 MP and the selfie camera is 8 MP. The battery has a 3300 mAh capacity.
