= Sony Xperia 10 IV =

Android smartphone

- Brand: Sony
- Manufacturer: Sony Corporation
- Type: Smartphone
- Series: Sony Xperia
- Availability by region: 8 July 2022; 4 years ago (Japan; XQ-CC44, SO-52C, SOG07 and A202SO models)
- Predecessor: Sony Xperia 10 III
- Successor: Sony Xperia 10 V
- Related: Sony Xperia 1 IV; Sony Xperia 5 IV
- Compatible networks: 2G; 3G; 4G LTE; 5G; WiMAX 2+ (SOG07 model only)
- Form factor: Slate
- Dimensions: 153 mm (6.0 in) H 67 mm (2.6 in) W 8.3 mm (0.33 in) D
- Weight: 161 g (5.7 oz)
- Operating system: Android 12 (Upgradable to Android 14); 2 OS updates, 3 years of security patches
- System-on-chip: Qualcomm Snapdragon 695
- CPU: Octa-core (2 × 2.2 GHz Kryo 660 Gold + 6 × 1.7 GHz Kryo 660 Silver)
- GPU: Adreno 619
- Memory: 6 GB LPDDR4X RAM
- Storage: Universal Flash Storage (UFS); 128 GB
- Removable storage: microSD, expandable up to 1 TB
- Battery: Non-removable 5000 mAh; USB PD 30 W Charging
- Rear camera: 12 MP f/1.8, 27 mm (wide), 1/2.8", PDAF, OIS + 8 MP f/2.4, 54 mm (telephoto), 1/4.4", PDAF, 2x optical zoom + 8 MP f/2.2, 16 mm (ultrawide), 1/4" LED flash, HDR, panorama, 1080p @ 30/60 fps
- Front camera: 8 MP, f/2.0, 24 mm (wide), 1/4", 1.0 μm, 1080p @ 30 fps
- Display: 6 in (150 mm) 1080p (2520 × 1080) HDR OLED, 457 px/in, Gorilla Glass Victus
- Sound: Loudspeaker, 3.5 mm headphone jack
- Connectivity: Wi-Fi 802.11 a/b/g/n/ac (2.4/5 GHz); Bluetooth 5.1; USB-C; NFC; GPS with Assisted GPS; GLONASS; Mobile FeliCa/Osaifu-Keitai (XQ-CC44, SO-52C, SOG07 and A202SO models only)
- Data inputs: Sensors: Accelerometer; Barometer; Fingerprint scanner (side-mounted, always on); Proximity sensor
- Water resistance: IP65/IP68, up to 1.5 m for 30 minutes
- Model: XQ-CC44 (Rakuten Mobile and SIM-unlocked; Japan); SO-52C (NTT Docomo); SOG07 (au/Okinawa Cellular); A202SO (SoftBank); XQ-CC72 (Hong Kong)
- Website: Official website (UK)

The Sony Xperia 10 IV (Note: The model's Roman numeral suffix is pronounced Mark IV ("mark four").) is a mid-range Android smartphone manufactured by Sony. Part of Sony's Xperia series, it was unveiled alongside the Xperia 1 IV on May 11, 2022.

== Design ==
The Xperia 10 IV has a plastic frame and back panel and Corning Glass Victus for the screen. The earpiece, front-facing camera, notification LED, and various sensors are housed in the top bezel, while the single front-firing speaker is housed in the bottom bezel. The power button/fingerprint sensor and volume rocker are located on the right side of the device, while the 3.5 mm headphone jack is located on the top. The rear cameras are located at the upper left-hand corner of the phone, with the LED flash above. The bottom edge has the primary microphone and a USB-C port. It is rated IP65/IP68 dust/water-proof up to 1.5 metres for 30 minutes. Black, white, mint, and lavender are the colours available at launch. Xperia 10 IV is also the last Xperia 10 series to feature an LED notification light, as the successor, the Xperia 10 V, removed the feature the following year.

== Specifications ==
=== Hardware ===
The device is powered by the Qualcomm Snapdragon 695 5G SoC and the Adreno 619 GPU. It is available with 6 GB of RAM and 128 GB of storage. MicroSD card expansion is supported up to 1 TB with a single-SIM or hybrid dual-SIM setup. The display is an OLED with HDR10 support, using a 6-inch (150 mm) 21:9 1080p (1080 × 2520) screen, which results in a pixel density of 457 ppi. It has a 5000 mAh battery ,which can be recharged at up to 30 W via the USB-C port. A triple camera setup is present on the rear, with a 12 MP f/1.8 primary sensor with PDAF and OIS, an 8 MP telephoto sensor and an 8 MP ultrawide sensor. The front-facing camera has an 8 MP sensor.

=== Software ===
The Xperia 10 IV runs on Android 12 at launch, with custom features such as Side Sense and Multi-window Switch. Updating to Android 13 was made available via OTA in January 2023. New updates over OTA are released for every other AOSP security update, but the delay between releases varies for each device variant. Sony Xperia 10 IV received its second and final OS update, Android 14 simultaneously with its flagship siblings, the Xperia 1 IV and 5 IV, on 8 January 2024.

== Notes ==
Preceded by Sony Xperia 10 III	Sony Xperia 10 IV; 2022	Succeeded by Sony Xperia 10 V
