= Shutter button =

Push-button found on cameras

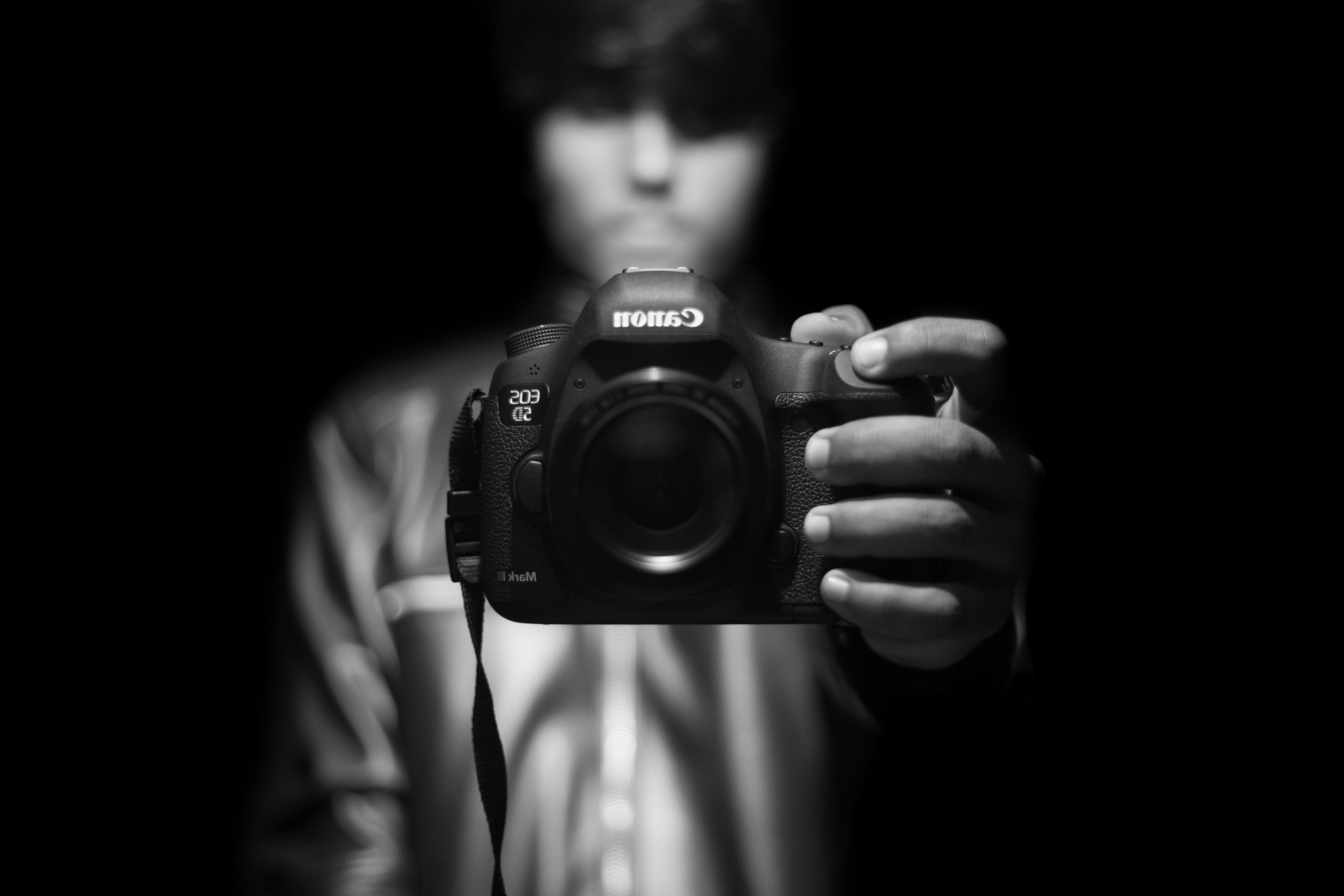
Pressing the shutter button

In photography, the shutter-release button (or shutter button or shutter release, also capture button) is a push-button found on many cameras, used to record photographs. When fully pressed, the shutter of the camera is "released", so that it opens to capture a picture, and then closes, allowing an exposure time as determined by the shutter speed setting (which may be automatic). Some cameras also utilize an electronic shutter, as opposed to a mechanical shutter.

In addition, many cameras, such as the Nikon Z50II, allow for the shutter button to be pressed halfway down. At that point, the camera focuses the lens. When the camera settings are for continuous focus, the lens stays focussed on the subject until the picture is taken by fully depressing the button. A half press is also used to initiate a pre-release capture.

The shutter-release button is one of the most basic features of a dedicated handheld camera. Mobile devices such as modern smartphones have a touchscreen button for capturing photos, but also have a physical shutter button as well, as the sound volume buttons are used as such, with exception of some phones having a dedicated shutter button.

The term "release" comes from old mechanical shutters that were "cocked" or "tensioned" by one lever, and then "released" by another. In modern or digital photography, this notion is less meaningful, so the term "shutter button" or simply "capture button" is more used.

== See also ==
- Remote shutter
- Selfie stick
- Bulb (photography)
