= Low-temperature polycrystalline silicon =

Transistor type used in the flat-panel display industry

Low-temperature polycrystalline silicon (LTPS) is polycrystalline silicon that has been synthesized at relatively low temperatures (~650 °C and lower). LTPS is important for display industries, since the use of large glass panels prohibits exposure to deformative high temperatures. More specifically, the use of polycrystalline silicon in thin-film transistors (LTPS-TFT) has high potential for large-scale production of electronic devices like flat panel LCD displays or image sensors.

LTPS is polycrystalline silicon that has been synthesized at ~650 °C and lower, compared to traditional methods (above 900 °C).

== Development of polycrystalline silicon ==
Polycrystalline silicon (p-Si) is a pure and conductive form of the element composed of many crystallites, or grains of highly ordered crystal lattice. In 1984, studies showed that amorphous silicon (a-Si) is an excellent precursor for forming p-Si films with stable structures and low surface roughness. Silicon film is synthesized by low-pressure chemical vapor deposition (LPCVD) to minimize surface roughness. First, amorphous silicon is deposited at 560–640 °C. Then it is thermally annealed (recrystallized) at 950–1000 °C. Starting with the amorphous film, rather than directly depositing crystals, produces a product with a superior structure and a desired smoothness. In 1988, researchers discovered that further lowering the temperature during annealing, together with advanced plasma-enhanced chemical vapor deposition (PECVD), could facilitate even higher degrees of conductivity. These techniques have profoundly impacted the microelectronics, photovoltaic, and display enhancement industries.

== Use in liquid-crystal displays ==
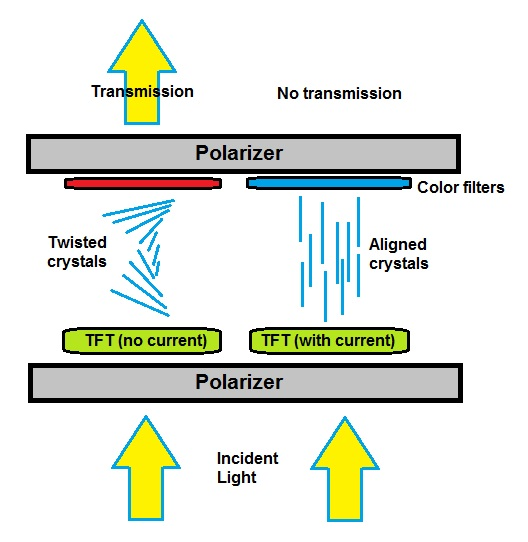
Diagram of liquid-crystal display. When current is applied to the transistor, the liquid crystals become aligned and no longer rotate the incident polarized light. This results in no transmission through the second polarizer, creating a dark pixel.

Amorphous silicon TFTs have been widely used in liquid-crystal display (LCD) flat panels because they can be assembled into complex high-current driver circuits. Amorphous Si-TFT electrodes drive the alignment of crystals in LCDs. The evolution of LTPS-TFTs can have many benefits such as higher device resolution, lower synthesis temperature, and reduced price of essential substrates. However, LTPS-TFTs also have several drawbacks. For example, the area of TFTs in traditional a-Si devices is large, resulting in a small aperture ratio (the amount of area which is not blocked by the opaque TFT and thus admits light). The incompatibility of different aperture ratios prevents LTPS-based complex circuits and drivers from being integrated into a-Si material. Additionally, the quality of LTPS decreases over time due to an increase in temperature upon turning on the transistor, which degrades the film by breaking the Si-H bonds in the material. This would cause the device to suffer from drain breakdown and current leakage, most notably in small and thin transistors, which dissipate heat poorly.

== Processing by laser annealing ==
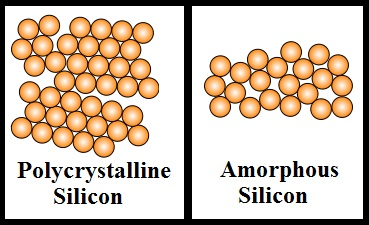
While amorphous silicon lacks crystal structure, polycrystalline silicon consists of various crystallites or grains, each of which has an organized lattice.

XeCl Excimer-Laser Annealing (ELA) is the first key method to produce p-Si by melting a-Si material through laser irradiation. The counterpart of a-Si, polycrystalline silicon, which can be synthesized from amorphous silicon by certain procedures, has several advantages over widely used a-Si TFT:

1. High electron mobility rate;
2. High resolution and aperture ratio;
3. Available for high integration of circuits.

XeCl-ELA succeeds in crystallizing a-Si (thickness ranges from 500-10000Å) into p-Si without heating the substrates. The polycrystalline form has larger grains that yield better mobility for TFTs due to reduced scattering from grain boundaries. This technique leads to the successful integration of complicated circuits in LCD displays.

== Development of LTPS-TFT devices ==
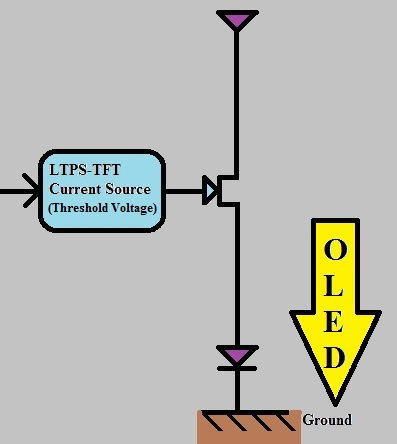
Schematic of LTPS-TFT being used to drive an OLED

Apart from the improvement of the TFTs themselves, the successful application of LTPS to graphical displays also depends on innovative circuits. One recent technique involves a pixel circuit in which the outgoing current from the transistor is independent of the threshold voltage, thus producing uniform brightness. LTPS-TFT is commonly used to drive OLED displays because it has high resolution and accommodation for large panels. However, variations in LTPS structure would result in non-uniform threshold voltage for signals and non-uniform brightness using traditional circuits. The new pixel circuit includes four n-type TFTs, one p-type TFT, a capacitor, and a control element to control the image resolution. Enhancing the performance and microlithography for TFTs is important for advancing LTPS active-matrix OLEDs.

These many important techniques have allowed the mobility of crystalline film to reach up to 13 cm2/Vs, and they have helped to mass-produce LEDs and LCDs over 500 ppi in resolution.

Characteristic	Amorphous Si	Polycrystalline Si
Mobility (cm^2 /(V*s))	0.5	>500
Deposition Method	PECVD	ELA
Deposition Temperature	350 °C	600 °C
Driver Integration	Only partial	System-on-glass
Resolution	Low	>500 ppi
Cost	Low	Relatively higher

== LTPO ==
Low-temperature polycrystalline oxide (LTPO) is a type of OLED display backplane technology developed by Apple that combines LTPS TFTs and oxide TFTs (indium gallium zinc oxide, or IGZO). In LTPO, the switching circuits use LTPS while the driving TFTs use IGZO materials. LTPO allows for more efficient use of power due to the lower leakage of the oxide gate insulation. LTPO displays are known for their improved battery life and can be found in some smartphones, smartwatches, and other mobile devices.

Although the core technology in LTPO is developed by Apple, Samsung also has its proprietary technology for LTPO AMOLED panels using a combination of LTPS TFTs and hybrid-oxide and polycrystalline silicon (HOP).

== See also ==
- Indium gallium zinc oxide
- Light-emitting diode
- Monocrystalline silicon
- Photovoltaics
- Wafer (electronics)
