= Sony Xperia 5 Series =

Line of Android smartphones

- Sony Xperia 5 logo

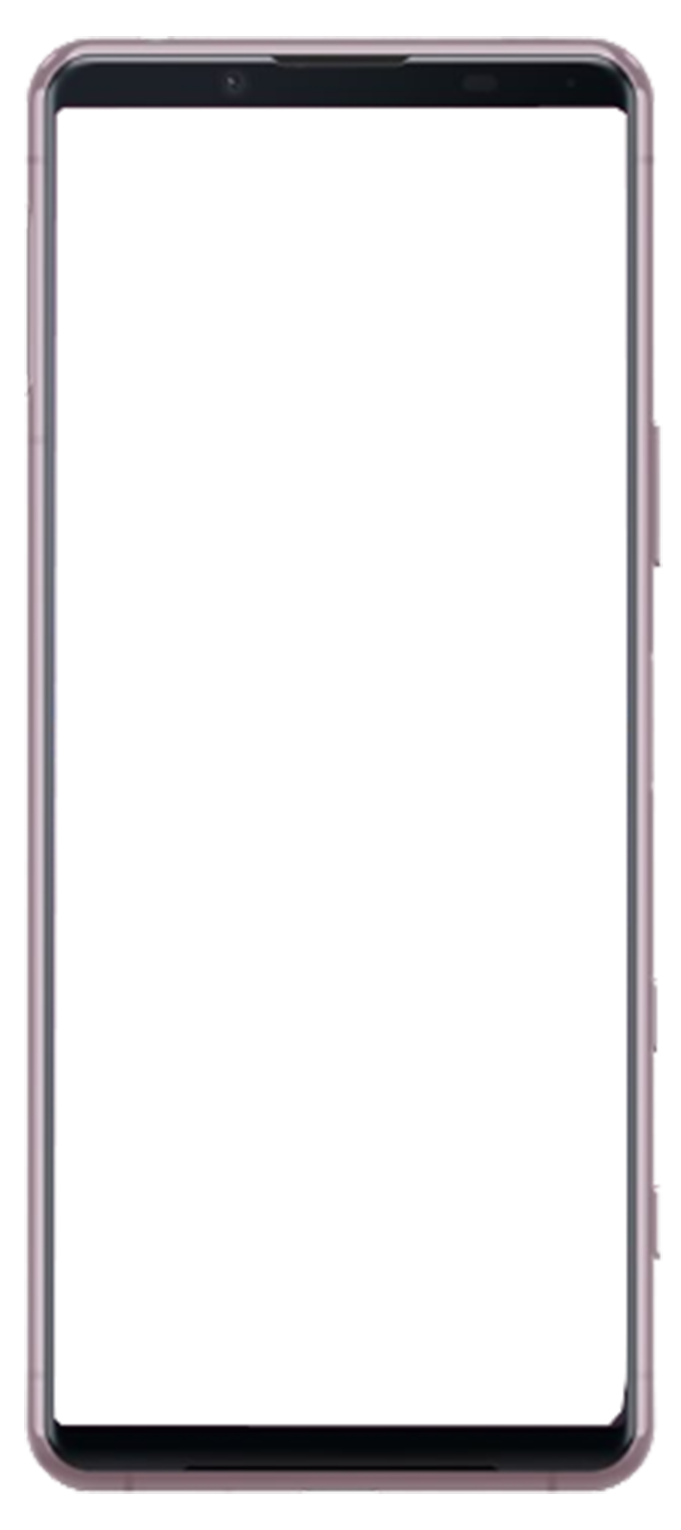
- Sony Xperia 5 II (2020) in Pink colorway
- Developer: Sony
- Manufacturer: Sony Electronics; Sony Mobile
- Product family: Sony Xperia
- Type: Smartphones
- Released: September 5, 2019; 7 years ago
- Lifespan: 2019-2025
- Introductory price: ~ 800 USD - 1000 USD
- Discontinued: 2025; 1 year ago
- Media: Sony Music, Game Enhancer, Video Creator App, Sony Pictures Core (Sony Xperia 5 IV and up)
- Operating system: Android
- System on a chip: Global: Qualcomm Snapdragon (2019−2023)
- CPU: Sony Xperia 5: Snapdragon 855; Sony Xperia 5 II: Snapdragon 865 5G; Sony Xperia 5 III: Snapdragon 888 5G; Sony Xperia 5 IV: Snapdragon 8 Gen 1 Sony Xperia 5 V: Snapdragon 8 Gen 2
- Memory: Sony Xperia 5: 6 GB; Sony Xperia 5 II- 5 V: 8 GB (LPDDR; Sony Xperia 5: LPDDR4X; Sony Xperia 5 II - 5 IV: LPDDR5; Sony Xperia 5 V: LPDDR5X)
- Storage: Universal Flash Storage (UFS); Xperia 5: UFS 2.1; Xperia 5 II: UFS 3.0; Xperia 5 III - V: UFS 3.1
- Removable storage: MicroSD card slot support Xperia 5: up to 512 GB; Xperia 5 II - V: 1 TB
- Display: 21:9 CinemaWide FHD+ HDR OLED (with 120Hz HRR since 5 II) (2019-2023)
- Graphics: Adreno GPU
- Sound: Stereo Speakers; Xperia 5: Hybrid stereo speakers Xperia 5 II-III: Front-firing stereo speakers Xperia 5 IV - V: Full-stage front-firing stereo speakers
- Input: Touchscreen; Sony Alpha camera support
- Controller input: DualShock; DualSense
- Camera: Main + Telephoto (except Xperia 5 V) + Ultrawide + Selfie Xperia 5: 12 MP Sony Exmor IMX563 26 mm OIS + 12 MP ISOCELL S5K3M3 52 mm OIS + 12 MP ISOCELL S5K3M3 16 mm + 8 MP Samsung ISOCELL S5K4H7; Xperia 5 II: 12 MP Exmor IMX557 24 mm OIS + 12 MP ISOCELL S5K3T2 70 mm OIS + 12 MP Exmor IMX363 16 mm Dual Pixel PDAF + 8 MP Samsung ISOCELL S5K4H7; Xperia 5 III: 12 MP Exmor IMX557 24 mm OIS + 12 MP Exmor IMX663 70 mm, 105 mm variable periscope telephoto OIS + 12 MP Exmor IMX363 16 mm Dual Pixel PDAF + 8 MP Samsung ISOCELL S5K4H7; Xperia 5 IV: 12 MP Exmor IMX557 24 mm OIS + 12 MP Exmor IMX650 60mm telephoto OIS + 12 MP Exmor IMX563 16 mm Dual Pixel PDAF + 12 MP Exmor IMX663; Xperia 5 V: 48 MP LYT-800/IMX888 24 mm OIS + 12 MP Exmor IMX563 16 mm Dual Pixel PDAF + 12 MP Exmor IMX663
- Connectivity: 2G; 3G; 4G; 5G (Xperia 5 II and up); Bluetooth 5.0-5.3; Wi-Fi 802.11 a/b/g/n/ac - a/b/g/n/ac/ax (6e) (2.4/5GHz); NFC; USB-C 3.1/3.2 Gen 1 (supports DisplayPort); GPS with Assisted GPS; Galileo; GLONASS; BeiDou
- Weight: 163 g (5.7 oz) - 182 g (6.4 oz)
- Predecessor: Sony Xperia Z series (2013-2015); Sony Xperia XZ series (2016-2018)
- Successor: Sony Xperia 1 Series (indirect, flagship specwise); Sony Xperia 10 series (only Sony Xperia 10 VII and up; size wise, indirect)
- Related: Sony Xperia 1 Series; Sony Xperia 10 Series
- Made in: Sony Xperia 5 - Sony Xperia 5 V: Thailand
- Website: https://www.sony.co.uk/smartphones/gallery

The Sony Xperia 5 Series was the former line of compact flagship Android smartphones in the Sony Xperia series manufactured by Sony Mobile from 2019 until its series discontinuation circa 2025. It succeeded both the Sony Xperia Z and Xperia XZ series, especially the Compact and Vanilla Z5 and XZ series, and acts as the compact variant of the Sony Xperia 1 series. Unlike in the Xperia Z and XZ naming scheme, the Sony Xperia 5 series (and subsequently the other numeral Xperia series introduced in 2019) borrowed their nomenclature from its Sony Alpha camera division, where every succession of the Xperia numeral series is stated with "Mark" (e.g., Xperia 5 II, spelled as "Sony Xperia 5 Mark 2), and was released annually instead of their predecessors' biennially. The latest and the final iteration of the Xperia 5 series was the Sony Xperia 5 V. The Xperia 5 series was later indirectly succeeded by the Sony Xperia 1 series for its flagship specs-wise and the Sony Xperia 10 series for its size-wise since the Sony Xperia 10 VII.

== Models ==
=== Smartphones ===
==== Sony Xperia 5 (2019) ====
At IFA 2019, Sony unveiled the original Xperia 5, replacing the Xperia XZ3, XZ2, and XZ2 Compact simultaneously. It is equipped with a 6.1-inch FHD+ HDR BT.2020 OLED with a 21:9 CinemaWide aspect ratio, introduced first in the original Sony Xperia 1 from MWC 2019. It is powered by Qualcomm Snapdragon 855 (TSMC-made 7 nm) with 6 GB of LPDDR4X RAM coupled with either 64 GB or 128 GB of UFS 2.1 of expandable storage (up to 512 GB) and is IP65/68 water and dust resistant, a typical feature in Sony flagships since the original Xperia Z from 2013. It is the second Sony Xperia device installed with a triple camera setup and OIS, after the original Xperia 1 itself. Likewise with the Xperia 1, it has a split power button and fingerprint sensor. It is equipped with Sony Alpha's signature feature of Eye Autofocus (AF) and pre-installed with the Sony CineAlta-developed Cinema Pro app. The Sony Xperia 5 is equipped with both front and back with Gorilla Glass 6, paired with a side aluminum alloy frame. The 21:9 aspect ratio emphasizes multitasking and multimedia consumption. It was announced 7 months after the Xperia 1, Xperia 10 series, and Xperia L3 at MWC 2019. It is the only Xperia 5 to ever be unveiled at the IFA event. Unlike the original Xperia 1, though, the Xperia 5 doesn't support the 960 fps Motion-Eye super slow motion feature seen first in the Xperia XZ Premium/XZs due to the different main camera sensor that does not support the multistacked sensor of the Xperia 1 or its predecessor, but it still supports Predictive Dual Pixel PDAF capture, the last Xperia to have it. Same as the original Xperia 1, it was the only Xperia 5 not to feature a 3.5 mm headphone jack, as its subsequent successors returned the feature the following year, first since the Xperia XZ1 series.

==== Sony Xperia 5 II (2020) ====
Due to the COVID-19 pandemic lockdown and restriction in 2020, especially since IFA 2020 should have taken place in Berlin, Germany, and was eventually cancelled, akin to the MWC 2020 event, the Xperia 5 II was announced by Sony via its online YouTube channel on 17 September 2020. It is equipped with a 6.1-inch FHD+ HDR BT.2020 OLED with a 21:9 CinemaWide aspect ratio, now with 120 Hz high refresh rate support, Sony's first smartphone to officially have and enable it. Powered by Qualcomm Snapdragon 865 5G (TSMC-made 7 nm+), it is the third Sony Xperia with 5G support after Sony Xperia 1 II and Sony Xperia PRO (2020), coupled with 8 GB of LPDDR5 RAM and 128 or 256 GB of UFS 3.0 of expandable storage (up to 1 TB), and with IP65/68 water-and-dust resistance.

==== Sony Xperia 5 IV (2022) ====
Sony unveiled the Mark IV of the Xperia 5 series on 1 September 2022 on its official YouTube channel, skipping IFA event for the third time, a tradition set by Xperia 5 II in 2020. It was announced 4 months after the Sony Xperia 1 IV and 10 IV. It is equipped with a Qualcomm Snapdragon 8 Gen 1 (Samsung-made 4 nm), IP 65/68 water-and-dust-resistant, 8 GB of LPDDR5, coupled with 128 GB or 256 GB of UFS 3.1 of expandable storage, up to 1 TB capacity. The Xperia 5 IV is installed with FHD+ HDR BT.2020 OLED with 120 Hz support of high refresh rate with a 21:9 CinemaWide aspect ratio, the same one equipped on its subsequent predecessor (5 II and 5 III), but like the 1 IV, with a brighter screen in every color mode. The Sony Xperia 5 IV introduced a more flat, industrial, boxier design reminiscent of the larger Xperia 1 IV, unlike its curved predecessors, and added wireless charging for the first time in the Xperia 5 series. However, unlike the larger Xperia 1 IV, the Xperia 5 IV didn't receive the continuous optical zoom technology, even dropping the variable optical zoom technology altogether. It is equipped with a standard 60 mm 2.5x telephoto lens, with a smaller, same Exmor IMX650 sensor of 1 IV. The Xperia 5 IV also received a selfie camera upgrade from the 8 MP Samsung ISOCELL S5K4H7 sensor at 1/4.0" into the 12 MP Sony IMX663 1/2.9", utilizing the same sensor of the 5 III's telephoto sensor. Just like the 1 IV, it enabled the 4K video capture for the selfie camera up to 30 fps, as the chassis for the 5 series was redesigned. Xperia 5 IV also enables all three rear cameras to capture up to 4K@120fps video recording. Music Pro and Video Pro have been brought from 1 IV and PRO-I. The 3.5 mm headphone jack and microSD card expandable storage capabilities are retained from its predecessor, while the battery capacity increased to 5000 mAh. It is the final Xperia 5 series to be equipped with a telephoto sensor and the very last Xperia ever to have a notification LED, as its successor, 5 V, removed the feature altogether. Xperia 5 IV is preinstalled with Android 12.

==== Sony Xperia 5 V (2023) ====
Sony announced the fifth generation and final iteration of the Xperia 5 series, the Xperia 5 V, on 1 September 2023 on its YouTube channel, skipping IFA for the fourth time despite being held on the same week. Unveiled four months after 1 V and 10 V, the Xperia 5 V is powered by a Qualcomm Snapdragon 8 Gen 2 (TSMC-made 4 nm), is IP65/68 water-and-dust resistant, and has 8 GB of LPDDR5X RAM paired with 128 GB or 256 GB of UFS 3.1 of expandable storage up to 1 TB. Just like the Xperia 1 V, the 5 V is equipped with a new Exmor T sensor/Sony Lytia sensor, which is equipped with 52 MP (48 MP effective), a 1/1.35" 4.3:3 multi-aspect sensor, and a 2-layer transistor pixel technology CMOS sensor for better low-light images for its main camera and doubling duty as the 5 V's 2x camera as well. It replaced the Exmor RS IMX557 sensor equipped since the Sony Xperia 5 II. The Sony Xperia 5 V removed the dedicated telephoto camera from its predecessor. It introduced a new redesign of the camera island that was also seen in the Xperia 10 VI in the following year. Same as the 5 IV and 1 V, Sony kept the 3.5 mm headphone jack and microSDXC card slot for expandable storage. Sony Xperia 5 V remained on sales in 2024 after Sony Xperia 5 VI was not coming.

== See also ==
- Sony Xperia 1 Series
- Sony Xperia
- Sony Xperia Z Series
- Sony Xperia 10 series
- Sony Xperia XA series
