= Sony Xperia 5 IV =

Android phablet

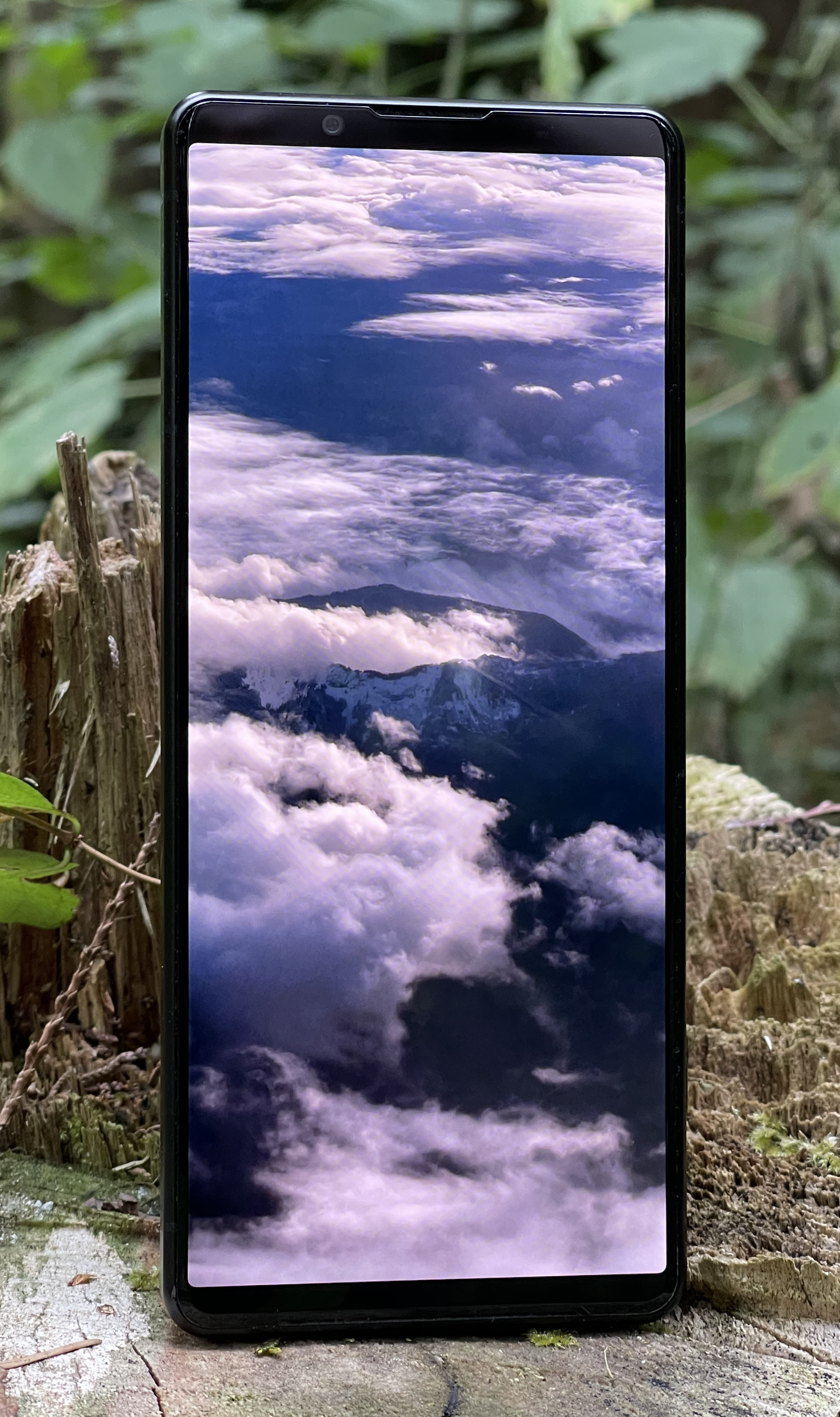
- Sony Xperia 5 IV in Black
- Also known as: Sony Xperia 5 Mark IV
- Brand: Sony
- Developer: Sony
- Manufacturer: Sony Corporation
- Type: Phablet
- Series: Sony Xperia
- Family: Sony Xperia 5 Series
- First released: 22 September 2022; 4 years ago
- Availability by region: 21 October 2022; 4 years ago (Japan; XQ-CQ44 for Rakuten Mobile, SO-54C, SOG09 and A204SO models); 1 February 2023; 3 years ago (Japan; XQ-CQ44 SIM-unlocked model)
- Predecessor: Sony Xperia 5 III
- Successor: Sony Xperia 5 V
- Related: Sony Xperia 1 IV
- Compatible networks: 2G; 3G; 4G LTE; 5G; WiMAX 2+ (SOG09 model only)
- Form factor: Slate
- Colors: Green; Black; Ecru White
- Dimensions: 156 mm (6.1 in) H 67 mm (2.6 in) W 8.2 mm (0.32 in) D
- Weight: 172 g (6.1 oz)
- Operating system: Android 12 (Upgradable to Android 14); 2 OS updates, 3 years of security patches
- System-on-chip: Qualcomm Snapdragon 8 Gen 1 (SM8450)
- CPU: Octa-core, 4 nm (4LPE); 1x 3.00 GHz Kryo Prime (ARM Cortex-X2-based); 3x 2.40 GHz Kryo Gold (ARM Cortex-A710-based); 4x 1.7 GHz Kryo Silver (ARM Cortex-A510-based)
- GPU: Adreno 730
- Modem: Qualcomm Snapdragon X65 5G
- Memory: 8 GB LPDDR5 RAM
- Storage: Universal Flash Storage (UFS 3.1); 128 GB (XQ-CQ44 for Rakuten Mobile, SO-54C, SOG09 and A204SO models); 256 GB (XQ-CQ44 SIM-unlocked model)
- Removable storage: microSDXC, expandable up to 1 TB
- SIM: eSIM + nanoSIM. nanoSIM + nanoSIM
- Battery: Non-removable Li-ion 5000 mAh
- Charging: USB PD 3.1 30 W Fast Charging; Qi 11 W Wireless Charging
- Rear camera: 12.2 MP (Sony Exmor RS IMX557), f/1.7, 24mm (wide), 1/1.7", 1.8 μm, predictive Dual Pixel PDAF, 5-axis OIS; 12.2 MP (Sony Exmor RS IMX650), f/2.4, 60mm (telephoto), 1/3.5", predictive Dual Pixel PDAF, 2.5x optical zoom, 5-axis OIS; 12.2 MP (Sony Exmor RS IMX363), f/2.2, 16mm (ultra-wide), 1/2.55", predictive Dual Pixel PDAF Zeiss optics, HDR, eye tracking 4K@24/25/30/60/120fps, 1080p@30/60/120/240fps
- Front camera: 12 MP (Sony Exmor RS IMX663), f/2.0, 20 mm (wide), 1/2.9", 1.0 μm, HDR, 4K@30fps, 1080p@30/60fps (5-axis gyro-EIS)
- Display: 6.1 in (150 mm) 1080p 21:9 (2520 × 1080) HDR OLED CinemaWide™ display, 120 Hz refresh rate, ~449 pixel density Gorilla Glass Victus; HDR BT.2020; 10-bit color depth (1B colors)
- Sound: Front Stereo speakers, 3.5 mm audio jack 360 Reality Audio hardware decoding LDAC Two Cirrus Logic CS35L41 amplifiers
- Media: Game Enhancer, Sony Pictures Core, Music,
- Connectivity: Wi-Fi 802.11 a/b/g/n/ac/ax (2.4/5GHz); Bluetooth 5.2; USB-C (supports DisplayPort); NFC; GPS with Assisted GPS; Galileo; GLONASS; BeiDou; Mobile FeliCa/Osaifu-Keitai (XQ-CQ44, SO-54C, SOG09 and A204SO models only)
- Data inputs: Sensors: Accelerometer; Barometer; Fingerprint scanner (side-mounted, always on); Gyroscope; Proximity sensor; Colour spectrum sensor
- Water resistance: IP65/IP68
- Model: XQ-CQ44(Japan); XQ-CQ54(Global); XQ-CQ62(USA); XQ-CQ72(China, Taiwan, South East Asia, Hong Kong); SO-54C (NTT Docomo); SOG09 (au/Okinawa Cellular); A204SO (SoftBank)
- Codename: XQ-CQ44, XQ-CQ54
- Development status: Released, Discontinued
- Made in: Thailand
- Other: Native Sony Alpha support IP65/IP68 Water/dust resistant PS5 Remote Play; DUALSENSE® Control compatibility Game Enhancer
- Website: Official website

The Sony Xperia 5 IV (Note: The model's Roman numeral suffix is read "Mark IV" (mark four).) is an Android-based smartphone manufactured by Sony. Part of Sony's Xperia series, the phone was announced on September 1, 2022. It is the last Xperia 5 series to be sold in the US market, as its successor, Xperia 5 V, was not sold in the US.

== Design ==
The Xperia 5 IV is built similarly to the Xperia 1 IV, using anodized aluminum for the frame and Corning Gorilla Glass Victus for the screen and back panel, as well as IP65 and IP68 certifications for water resistance. The build has a pair of symmetrical bezels on the top and the bottom, where the front-facing dual stereo speakers are placed. The right side contains a fingerprint reader embedded into the power button, a volume rocker and a shutter button. The earpiece, front-facing camera, notification LED and various sensors are housed in the top bezel. The bottom edge has the primary microphone, USB-C port, and SIM/microSDXC card slot; the rear cameras are arranged in a vertical strip. The phone is available in three colors: Black, Green and White. Xperia 5 IV marks the last both Xperia 5 series and all Xperia to feature notification LED, as the successor, Sony Xperia 5 V, has removed the feature.

== Specifications ==
=== Hardware ===
The Xperia 5 IV is powered by the Qualcomm Snapdragon 8 Gen 1 SoC and an Adreno 730 GPU, accompanied by 8 GB of LPDDR5 RAM. It has 128 or 256 GB of UFS internal storage, which can be expanded up to 1 TB via the microSD card slot with a hybrid dual-SIM setup. The display is a 6.1-inch 1080p (2520 × 1080) HDR OLED with a 21:9 aspect ratio, resulting in a pixel density of 449 ppi. It features a 120 Hz refresh rate, and is capable of displaying one billion colors. The battery capacity is 5000 mAh; USB Power Delivery 3.0 is supported at 30 W over USB-C in addition to wireless charging. The device includes a 3.5 mm audio jack as well as an active external amplifier.

==== Camera ====
The Xperia 5 IV has three 12 MP rear-facing cameras and a 12 MP front-facing camera. The rear cameras consist of a wide-angle lens (24 mm f/1.7), an ultra wide angle lens (16 mm f/2.2), and a telephoto lens (60 mm f/2.4) with 2.5× optical zoom; each uses ZEISS' T✻ (T-Star) anti-reflective coating.

=== Software ===
The Xperia 5 IV runs on Android 12. Sony has also paired the phone's camera tech with a "Pro" mode developed by Sony's camera division CineAlta, whose features take after Sony's Alpha camera lineup.
