= Sony Xperia 5 =

Android phablet

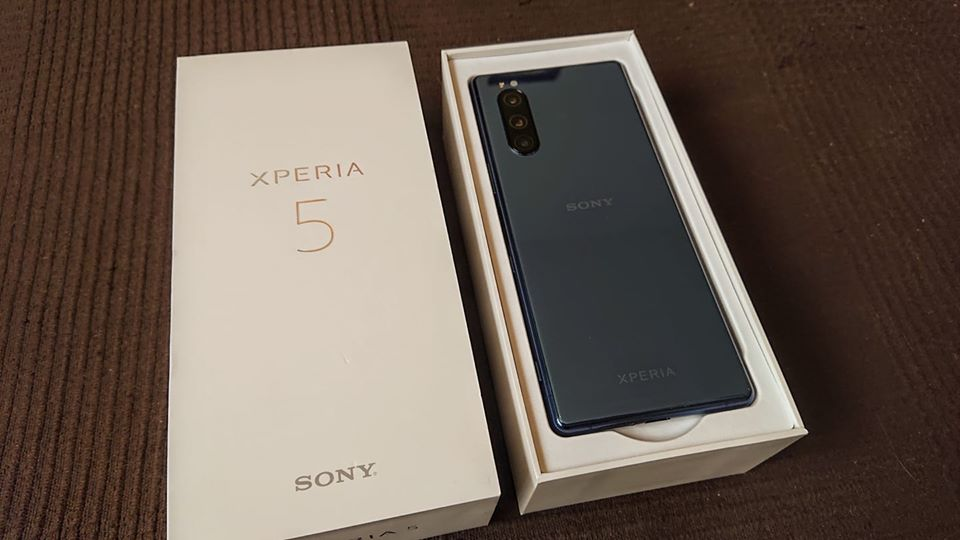
- Also known as: Sony Xperia 5 Mark I
- Brand: Sony
- Manufacturer: Sony Mobile Communications
- Type: Phablet
- Series: Sony Xperia
- Family: Sony Xperia 5 Series
- First released: 24 September 2019; 7 years ago
- Availability by region: 24 September 2019; 7 years ago (China); 4 October 2019; 7 years ago (United Kingdom); 25 October 2019; 6 years ago (Japan; SOV41 and 901SO models); 1 November 2019; 6 years ago (Japan; SO-01M model); 2 November 2019; 6 years ago (France); 5 November 2019; 6 years ago (United States); 28 August 2020; 6 years ago (Japan; J9260 SIM-unlocked model)
- Predecessor: Sony Xperia XZ2 Compact; Sony Xperia XZ3
- Successor: Sony Xperia 5 II
- Related: Sony Xperia 1
- Compatible networks: 2G; 3G; 4G LTE; WiMAX 2+ (SOV41 model only)
- Form factor: Slate
- Colors: Black; Blue; Red; Grey
- Dimensions: 158 mm (6.2 in) H 68 mm (2.7 in) W 8.2 mm (0.32 in) D
- Weight: 164 g (5.8 oz)
- Operating system: Android 9 "Pie" upgradeable to Android 11
- System-on-chip: Qualcomm Snapdragon 855
- CPU: Octa-core (1x 2.84 GHz Gold Prime, 3x 2.42 GHz Gold, 4x 1.8 GHz Silver) Kryo 485
- GPU: Adreno 640
- Modem: Qualcomm Snapdragon X24 4G
- Memory: 6 GB LPDDR4X RAM
- Storage: Universal Flash Storage (UFS); 64 GB (SO-01M, SOV41 and 901SO models); 128 GB (J8210, J8270, J9210 and J9260 models)
- Removable storage: microSD, expandable up to 512 GB
- Battery: Non-removable Li-ion 3140 mAh rated capacity: 3000 mAh
- Rear camera: 12.2 MP (Sony IMX563), f/1.6, 26mm (wide), 1/2.6", 1.4 μm, predictive Dual Pixel PDAF, 5-axis OIS; 12.2 MP (Samsung ISOCELL S5K3M3), f/2.4, 52mm (telephoto), 1/3.4", 1.0 μm, predictive Dual Pixel PDAF, 2x optical zoom, 5-axis OIS; 12.2 MP (Samsung ISOCELL S5K3M3), f/2.4, 16mm (ultra-wide), 1/3.4", 1.0 μm
- Front camera: 8 MP (Samsung ISOCELL S5K4H7), f/2.0, 24mm (wide), 1/4", 1.0 μm, 1080p@30fps (5-axis gyro-EIS)
- Display: 6.1 in (150 mm) 1080p (2520 x 1080) HDR OLED, ~449 pixel density, Gorilla Glass 6, 8-bit (16M colors)
- Sound: Stereo speakers (hybrid)
- Media: Music, Sony Album
- Connectivity: Wi-Fi 802.11 a/b/g/n/ac (2.4/5GHz); Bluetooth 5.0; USB-C; NFC; GPS with Assisted GPS; Galileo; GLONASS; BeiDou; 1seg (SO-01M, SOV41 and 901SO models only); Mobile FeliCa/Osaifu-Keitai (J9260, SO-01M, SOV41 and 901SO models only)
- Data inputs: Sensors: Accelerometer; Barometer; Fingerprint scanner (side-mounted, always on); Gyroscope; Proximity sensor; Colour spectrum sensor
- Water resistance: IP65/68
- Model: J8210; J8270; J9210; J9260; SO-01M (NTT Docomo); SOV41 (au/Okinawa Cellular); 901SO (SoftBank)
- Codename: Bahamut
- Development status: Released, Discontinued
- Made in: Thailand
- Other: IP65/68, DualShock support, Smart Connectivity Switch
- Website: Official website

The Sony Xperia 5 is an Android-based smartphone marketed and manufactured by Sony. Part of Sony's flagship Xperia series, it was unveiled at the annual IFA event on 5 September 2019. The device is a more compact and affordable variant of the Xperia 1.

== Design ==
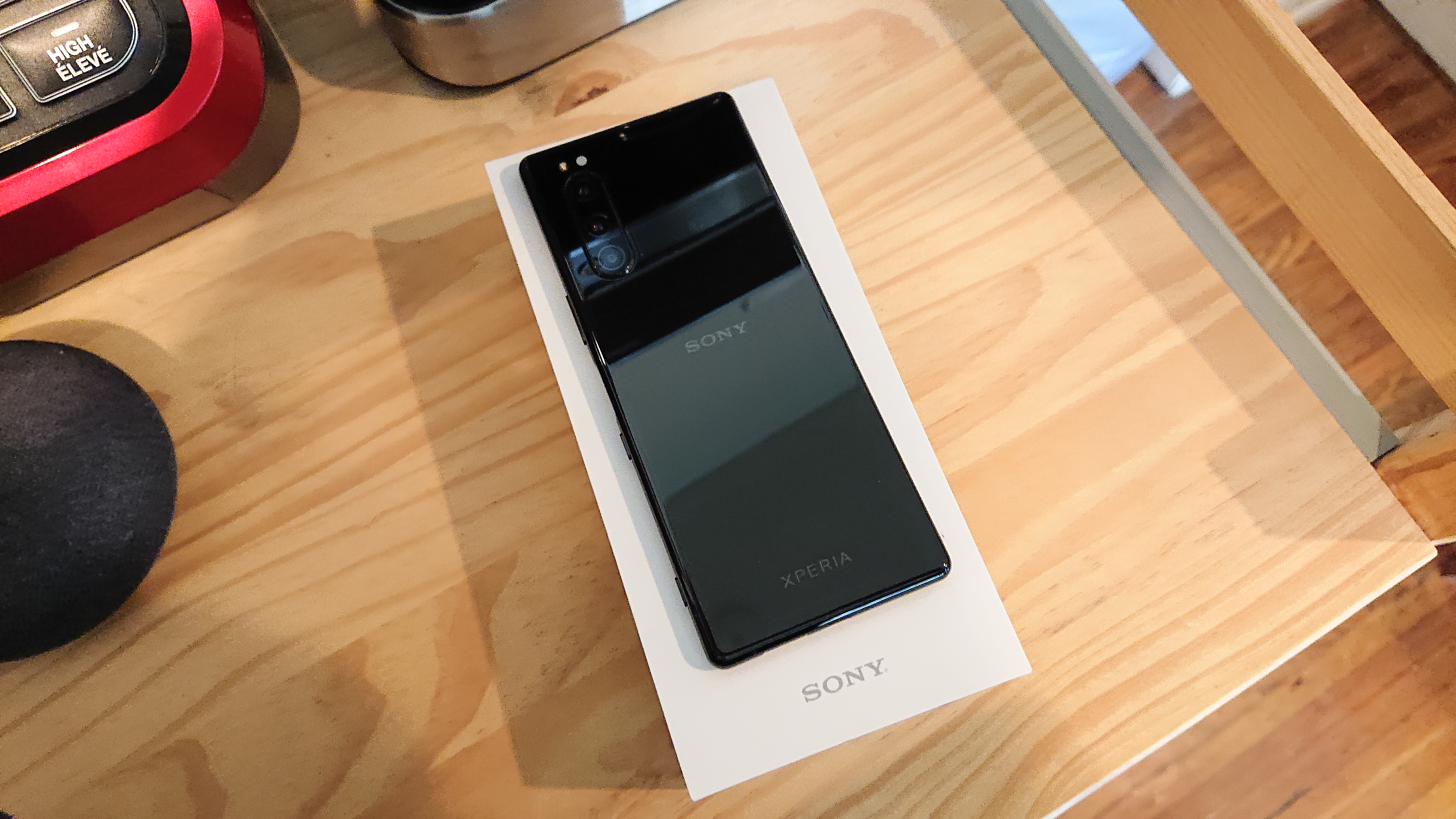
Sony Xperia 5 in black

The Xperia 5 closely resembles the Xperia 1 but features a smaller form factor. Like its predecessor, it uses an aluminum frame and Corning Gorilla Glass 6 for both the screen and back panel. The button layout remains unchanged, with the volume, power, and shutter release buttons, as well as the always-on fingerprint scanner, positioned on the right side. However, the card slot has been relocated to the left side, unlike the top-mounted tray on the Xperia 1. Notably, the camera module, color-sensing (RGBC-IR sensor), and LED flash have been moved to the upper-left corner, similar to earlier Xperia models. The top bezel houses the earpiece/top speaker, front-facing camera, notification LED, and various sensors. The bottom edge features the primary microphone, a downward-firing speaker, and the USB-C port. Measuring 158 × 68 × 8.2 mm, the Xperia 5 is 9 mm shorter and 4 mm narrower than the Xperia 1, though it retains the same depth. The reduced dimensions also result in a lighter weight of 164 g (5.78 oz), 14 g (0.5 oz) less than the Xperia 1. It maintains the same IP65/68 rating and is available in four colors: Blue, Red, Black, and Grey.

== Specifications ==
=== Hardware ===
The Xperia 5 retains the same chipset as the Xperia 1: a Qualcomm Snapdragon 855 SoC paired with an Adreno 640 GPU and 6 GB of LPDDR4X RAM. It is available only with 128 GB of UFS internal storage (omitting the 64 GB option found on the Xperia 1) and supports microSD expansion up to 512 GB via a hybrid dual-SIM setup. The display is smaller and lower-resolution than the Xperia 1's, featuring a 6.1-inch (155 mm) 21:9 1080p (2520 × 1080) HDR OLED panel with a pixel density of 449 ppi. The camera system shares similar hardware with the Xperia 1—a 12 MP primary lens, a 12 MP telephoto lens, and a 12 MP ultrawide lens, along with an 8 MP front camera—but lacks the 960 fps slow-motion capability due to the absence of a stacked memory sensor. However, Sony enhanced the Eye AF autofocus, enabling it to function at 30 fps. The battery is 6% smaller than the Xperia 1's, with a 3140 mAh capacity supporting 18W fast charging via the USB-C 3.1 port. The 3.5 mm audio jack remains absent, though an active external amplifier is included. Connectivity options are largely unchanged. (The Japanese SO-01M variant was available exclusively with 64 GB of storage.)

=== Software ===
The Xperia 5 launched with Android 9 "Pie", featuring Smart Stamina battery-saving modes and Sony's proprietary multimedia apps. It includes an improved Side Sense feature, which utilizes touch-sensitive areas on both sides of the phone. A tap or swipe activates user-configurable actions, including adjustable sensitivity. Another feature, Pair Shortcut, enables instant split-screen mode with two user-selected apps when triggered from the Side Sense menu. In December 2019, Sony began rolling out Android 10 for the Xperia 5. The device is upgradeable to Android 11, which marked its final major update before discontinuation.

== Variants ==
=== Japanese models ===
==== SO-01M, SOV41, and 901SO ====
On October 10, 2019, the localized model, modeled as the "SOV41" for the au carrier announced by KDDI It was released fifteen days later and also includes exlusive colorways: black, white, orange, and blue. On October 17, 2019, another model—the "901SO"—was announced by SoftBank with pre-orders on October 18 until it release alongside SOV41 model. Additionally, NTT Docomo announced the "SO-01M" model on October 11, 2019 and was scheduled to release on November 1.

== Reception ==
Camera tester DXOMARK give a score of 101 for photo and 95 for videos, making an overall score of 95. It was noticeably similar to the Sony Xperia 1 and was praised for its enhanced exposure, night-mode, wide-angle shots, and texture.
