= List of films released in IMAX (2010s) =

Films released in IMAX in the 2010s

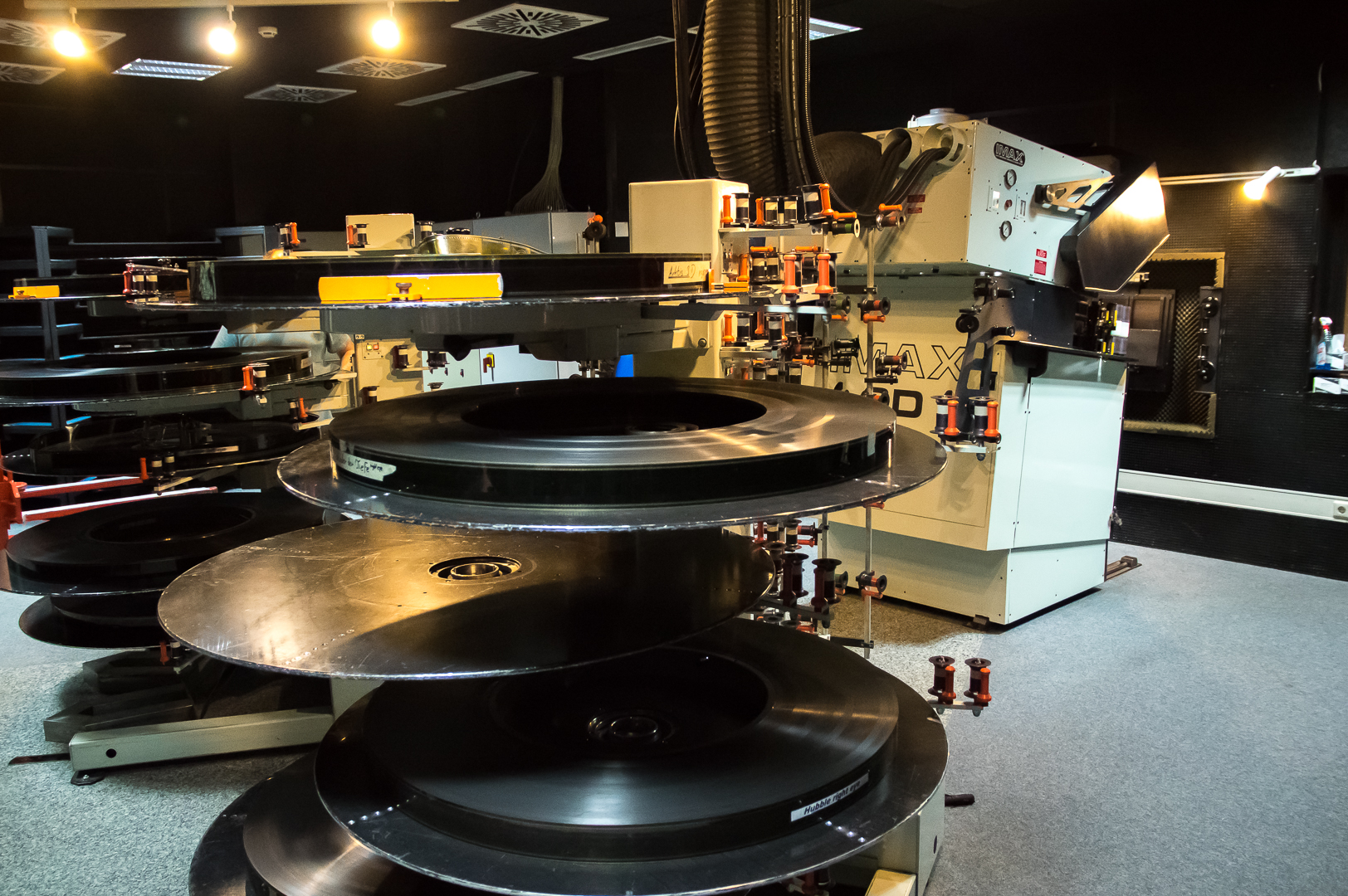
IMAX 70mm projection system

This is a list of films released in IMAX in the 2010s, a motion-picture film format and projection standard. IMAX cameras and film stock are rarely used for mainstream films; the cameras are heavy and the film stock is expensive. However, since 2002, some feature films shot with IMAX digital cameras or on original 35mm film stock have undergone IMAX Digital Media Remastering (DMR) processing for showing both in 70mm IMAX theaters and in IMAX Digital theaters.

Several animated titles (Fantasia 2000, Beauty and the Beast, Treasure Planet, The Lion King, Falling in Love Again, CyberWorld, Fly Me to the Moon 3D, and Santa vs. the Snowman 3D) were released in IMAX 70mm prints; however, they were not subject to DMR processing. Academy Award-winning cinematographer Roger Deakins supervised custom transfers for Skyfall, Blade Runner 2049, and 1917 rather than using IMAX's DMR process.

This list includes the films that have been released in IMAX theaters. Films that were presented in IMAX theaters using either 35mm or digital prints, but were never specifically mastered for IMAX, are not included.

== 2010 ==
Name	Release date	Format			Notes
Name	Release date	70mm	Digital	Laser	Notes
Alice in Wonderland	5 March 2010	Yes	Yes	No	In 3D (conversion).
How to Train Your Dragon (2010)	26 March 2010	Yes	Yes	No	In 3D.
Iron Man 2	7 May 2010	Yes	Yes	No	Limited engagement.
Shrek Forever After	21 May 2010	Yes	Yes	No	In 3D.
Prince of Persia: The Sands of Time	28 May 2010	Yes	No	No	Selected territories only.
Toy Story 3	18 June 2010	Yes	Yes	Yes	In 3D. Preceded by the short film Day & Night.
The Twilight Saga: Eclipse	30 June 2010	Yes	No	No	Limited engagement.
Inception	16 July 2010	Yes	Yes	Yes	Select scenes filmed in standard 65mm. Re-released as a 10th Anniversary on 12 August 2020.
Aftershock	22 July 2010	No	Yes	No	First IMAX DMR Chinese release. Selected territories only.
Avatar: Special Edition	27 August 2010	Yes	Yes	No	In 3D (conversion). Presented in 1.78:1 aspect ratio. Re-release with extended scenes. First IMAX DMR film to surpass 170 minutes. Closing credits changed to slide format and one closing credits song omitted to reduce running time for 70mm prints.
Resident Evil: Afterlife	10 September 2010	No	Yes	No	In 3D. Filmed with the Fusion Camera System. Preserved on home media for IMAX Enhanced on Sony Pictures Core.
Legend of the Guardians: The Owls of Ga'Hoole	24 September 2010	Yes	Yes	No	In 3D. Preceded by the short film Fur of Flying.
Paranormal Activity 2	20 October 2010	No	Yes	No	Limited engagement.
Megamind	5 November 2010	Yes	Yes	No	In 3D.
Harry Potter and the Deathly Hallows – Part 1	19 November 2010	Yes	Yes	Yes	3D converted version released direct-to-video due to time constraints.
Tron: Legacy	17 December 2010	Yes	Yes	Yes	In 3D. Filmed with the Fusion Camera System. 45 minutes printed with a 1.78:1 aspect ratio for IMAX 70mm prints and 1.90:1 for IMAX Digital. Preserved on home media in 1.78:1 (16:9) aspect ratio. Re-released 8 October 2025 in IMAX 3D as part of a one-night-only double-feature with Tron: Ares.

== 2011 ==
Name	Release date	Format			Notes
Name	Release date	70mm	Digital	Laser	Notes
The Green Hornet	14 January 2011	No	Yes	No	In 3D (conversion).
Tangled	2 February 2011	No	Yes	No	In 3D. Released in Asia only.
Sanctum	4 February 2011	No	Yes	No	In 3D. Filmed with the Fusion Camera System. Limited engagement.
I Am Number Four	18 February 2011	No	Yes	No	
Mars Needs Moms	11 March 2011	Yes	Yes	No	In 3D.
Sucker Punch	25 March 2011	Yes	Yes	No	
Born to be Wild	8 April 2011	Yes	Yes	No	In 3D. Filmed with an IMAX 65mm camera and a prototype Phantom 65 IMAX 3D Digital camera. First feature to be partially filmed with an IMAX 3D digital camera with ~20 minutes of footage.
Fast Five	29 April 2011	Yes	Yes	No	
Thor	6 May 2011	No	Yes	Yes	In 3D (conversion).
Pirates of the Caribbean: On Stranger Tides	20 May 2011	Yes	Yes	No	In 3D. Filmed with the Fusion Camera System.
Kung Fu Panda 2	26 May 2011	No	Yes	No	In 3D. Selected territories only. Limited engagement.
Super 8	10 June 2011	Yes	Yes	No	
The Founding of a Party	15 June 2011	No	Yes	No	Released in China only. International version released in 35mm only, under the title Beginning of the Great Revival.
Cars 2	24 June 2011	Yes	Yes	No	In 3D. Preceded by the short film Hawaiian Vacation.
Transformers: Dark of the Moon	29 June 2011	Yes	Yes	Yes	In 3D (conversion). Filmed with the Fusion Camera System. Half of the film was shot in 2D, then converted to 3D in post-production.
Harry Potter and the Deathly Hallows – Part 2	15 July 2011	Yes	Yes	Yes	In 3D (conversion).
Sector 7	4 August 2011	No	Yes	No	In 3D. First IMAX DMR South Korean release. Released in South Korea only.
Cowboys & Aliens	11 August 2011	No	Yes	No	Selected territories only.
Final Destination 5	12 August 2011	No	Yes	Yes	In 3D. Filmed with the Fusion Camera System.
Contagion	9 September 2011	No	Yes	No	
Real Steel	7 October 2011	Yes	Yes	No	
Puss in Boots	28 October 2011	No	Yes	No	In 3D.
Happy Feet Two	18 November 2011	Yes	Yes	No	In 3D. Preceded by the short film I Tawt I Taw a Puddy Tat. Limited engagement. The most recent IMAX 70mm DMR release of an animated feature on standard IMAX screens.
Flying Swords of Dragon Gate	15 December 2011	No	Yes	No	In 3D. Aspect ratio opened up to 1.90:1 for the entire film.
Mission: Impossible – Ghost Protocol	16 December 2011	Yes	Yes	Yes	30 minutes shot with IMAX 65mm cameras, presented in a 1.43:1 aspect ratio at IMAX GT Venues. Six-minute preview of The Dark Knight Rises attached to IMAX 70mm prints.
The Adventures of Tintin	21 December 2011	No	Yes	No	In 3D.

== 2012 ==
Name	Release date	Format			Notes
Name	Release date	70mm	Digital	Laser	Notes
Underworld: Awakening	20 January 2012	No	Yes	No	In 3D.
Journey 2: The Mysterious Island	10 February 2012	Yes	Yes	No	In 3D. Filmed with the Fusion Camera System. Preceded by the short film Daffy's Rhapsody.
Dr. Seuss' The Lorax	2 March 2012	No	Yes	No	In 3D.
John Carter	9 March 2012	Yes	Yes	No	In 3D (conversion).
The Hunger Games	23 March 2012	No	Yes	No	Limited engagement.
HOUBA! On the Trail of the Marsupilami	28 March 2012	No	Yes	No	First IMAX DMR French release. Selected territories only.
Wrath of the Titans	30 March 2012	Yes	Yes	No	In 3D (conversion).
James Cameron's Titanic	4 April 2012	Yes	Yes	No	In 3D (conversion). Originally released in 1997 with a 2.39:1 aspect ratio, opened up to 1.78:1 for this presentation and preserved on home media for Blu-ray 3D. First IMAX DMR film to surpass both 180 and 190 minutes. For IMAX 70mm prints, the film was split into 2 parts due to platter size limits, with the first part running approximately 108 minutes and the second part running approximately 87 minutes with a 15-minute intermission in between. The longest IMAX 3D DMR film to date. Re-released in HFR (48fps) 3D on 10 February 2023, for its 25th anniversary. At 194 minutes, Titanic is the longest IMAX 3D release of all time as of October 2023.
Battleship	12 April 2012	No	Yes	No	Selected territories only.
The Avengers	4 May 2012	No	Yes	Yes	In 3D (conversion).
Dark Shadows	11 May 2012	Yes	Yes	No	
Men in Black 3	25 May 2012	No	Yes	Yes	In 3D (conversion). 5-minute preview of The Amazing Spider-Man attached. Preserved on home media for IMAX Enhanced on Sony Pictures Core.
Prometheus	1 June 2012	Yes	Yes	No	In 3D. Aspect ratio opened up to 2.00:1 for the entire film.
Madagascar 3: Europe's Most Wanted	8 June 2012	No	Yes	No	In 3D. Selected territories only. Limited engagement.
Rock of Ages	15 June 2012	No	Yes	No	Limited engagement.
The Amazing Spider-Man	3 July 2012	Yes	Yes	Yes	In 3D. 20 minutes of footage, surrounding most of the finale, presented in a 1.9:1 aspect ratio. Preserved on home media. Locked to 2.39:1 for IMAX Enhanced on Sony Pictures Core.
The Dark Knight Rises	20 July 2012	Yes	Yes	Yes	70 minutes shot with IMAX 65mm cameras, in an expanded 1.43:1 aspect ratio for IMAX GT Venues. Home-Media (excl Streaming & DVD) retained the expanded Aspect Ratio in a cropped 1.78:1 (16:9) for IMAX scenes. The pre-show included a special version of the IMAX Countdown.
Total Recall	3 August 2012	No	Yes	No	Selected territories only. Limited engagement.
Raiders of the Lost Ark	7 September 2012	No	Yes	Yes	Originally released in 1981. Re-released in select North American IMAX theaters on 26 June 2020.
Resident Evil: Retribution	14 September 2012	No	Yes	No	In 3D. Preserved on home media for IMAX Enhanced on Sony Pictures Core.
The Bourne Legacy	19 September 2012	No	Yes	No	Selected territories only. Limited engagement.
Tai Chi 0	27 September 2012	No	Yes	No	In 3D. China only.
Frankenweenie	6 October 2012	No	Yes	No	In 3D. Limited engagement. The first stop-motion film released in IMAX 3D.
Paranormal Activity 4	19 October 2012	No	Yes	No	Limited engagement.
Tai Chi Hero	25 October 2012	No	Yes	No	In 3D. China only.
Cloud Atlas	26 October 2012	No	Yes	No	
Skyfall	26 October 2012	Yes	Yes	No	Aspect ratio opened up to 1.90:1 for the entire film. The DMR process was not used for the film, instead a custom transfer was made.
Cirque du Soleil: Worlds Away	9 November 2012	No	Yes	No	In 3D. Filmed with the Fusion Camera System. IMAX 3D version released in Japan only.
The Twilight Saga: Breaking Dawn – Part 2	16 November 2012	No	Yes	No	Selected territories only.
Life of Pi	21 November 2012	No	Yes	No	In 3D. Filmed with the Fusion Camera System. Enhanced framing technique known as "Frame-Break" used to enhance 3D effects, making effects travel "outside" the screen.
Rise of the Guardians	21 November 2012	No	Yes	No	In 3D. Limited engagement.
Back to 1942	29 November 2012	No	Yes	No	China only.
CZ12	12 December 2012	No	Yes	No	In 3D. China only.
The Hobbit: An Unexpected Journey	14 December 2012	Yes	Yes	No	In 3D. First IMAX 3D film to be filmed in 5K HDR and HFR (48fps), with presentations in 24fps and 48fps. 10-minute preview of Star Trek Into Darkness attached to IMAX Digital prints. Closing credits changed to slide format and two closing credits songs omitted to reduce running time for IMAX 70mm prints.
Les Misérables	25 December 2012	No	Yes	No	Select territories only.

== 2013 ==
Name	Release date	Format			Notes
Name	Release date	70mm	Digital	Laser	Notes
The Grandmaster	8 January 2013	No	Yes	No	China only.
Hansel & Gretel: Witch Hunters	25 January 2013	No	Yes	No	In 3D (conversion). Half of the film was shot in 2D, then converted to 3D during post-production. 5-minute preview of G.I. Joe: Retaliation attached.
Top Gun	8 February 2013	No	Yes	Yes	In 3D (conversion). Originally released in 1986. Limited engagement. Re-released on 13 May 2026 in 2D with Top Gun: Maverick for the film's 40th anniversary.
Journey to the West: Conquering the Demons	10 February 2013	No	Yes	No	In 3D (conversion). China only.
A Good Day to Die Hard	14 February 2013	No	Yes	No	
Jack the Giant Slayer	1 March 2013	Yes	Yes	No	In 3D.
Oz the Great and Powerful	8 March 2013	No	Yes	No	In 3D. 5-minute preview of Jurassic Park 3D attached.
G.I. Joe: Retaliation	29 March 2013	No	Yes	No	In 3D (conversion). Limited engagement.
Dragon Ball Z: Battle of Gods	30 March 2013	No	Yes	No	
Jurassic Park	5 April 2013	Yes	Yes	No	In 3D (conversion). Originally released in 1993.
Oblivion	19 April 2013	Yes	Yes	No	Aspect ratio opened up to 1.90:1 for the entire film.
Iron Man 3	3 May 2013	Yes	Yes	No	In 3D (conversion).
Star Trek Into Darkness	17 May 2013	Yes	Yes	Yes	In 3D (conversion). 30 minutes shot with IMAX 65mm cameras, in expanded 1.66:1 and 1.90:1 aspect ratios for IMAX GT and IMAX Digital Venues. Home-Media (4K Blu-ray) retained the expanded Aspect Ratio in a cropped 1.78:1 (16:9) for IMAX scenes.
Fast & Furious 6	22 May 2013	No	Yes	No	Selected territories only.
After Earth	31 May 2013	No	Yes	No	Limited engagement. Preserved on home media for IMAX Enhanced on Sony Pictures Core.
Man of Steel	14 June 2013	Yes	Yes	No	In 3D (conversion).
Despicable Me 2	20 June 2013	No	Yes	No	In 3D. Selected territories only.
World War Z	21 June 2013	No	Yes	No	In 3D (conversion). Selected territories only. Expanded to select domestic theaters on 2 August 2013.
White House Down	28 June 2013	No	Yes	No	Selected territories only. Limited engagement.
Man of Tai Chi	5 July 2013	No	Yes	No	China only.
Pacific Rim	12 July 2013	Yes	Yes	No	In 3D (conversion).
The Lone Ranger	2 August 2013	No	Yes	No	Selected territories only. Limited engagement.
Elysium	9 August 2013	Yes	Yes	No	Preserved on home media for IMAX Enhanced on Sony Pictures Core.
The Mortal Instruments: City of Bones	21 August 2013	No	Yes	No	First IMAX DMR German release. Limited engagement.
Riddick	6 September 2013	No	Yes	No	Aspect ratio opened up to 1.90:1 for select sequences.
The Wizard of Oz	20 September 2013	No	Yes	No	In 3D (conversion). Originally released in 1939. Limited engagement. The pre-show included a special version of the IMAX Countdown.
Metallica: Through the Never	27 September 2013	No	Yes	No	In 3D. Limited engagement.
Young Detective Dee: Rise of the Sea Dragon	28 September 2013	No	Yes	No	In 3D. China only. Aspect ratio opened up to 1.90:1 for the entire film.
Gravity	4 October 2013	No	Yes	Yes	In 3D (conversion).
Stalingrad	10 October 2013	No	Yes	No	In 3D. First IMAX DMR Russian release. Selected territories only.
Captain Phillips	11 October 2013	No	Yes	No	Limited engagement.
The Young and Prodigious T.S. Spivet	16 October 2013	No	Yes	No	In 3D. France only.
Ender's Game	1 November 2013	No	Yes	No	
Thor: The Dark World	8 November 2013	No	Yes	Yes	In 3D (conversion). Limited engagement.
The Hunger Games: Catching Fire	22 November 2013	Yes	Yes	Yes	50-minute expanded 1.43:1 aspect ratio arena battle sequence shot with IMAX 65mm cameras. Home-Media (Blu-ray & DVD) retained the expanded Aspect Ratio in a cropped 1.78:1 (16:9) for IMAX scenes.
The Hobbit: The Desolation of Smaug	13 December 2013	Yes	Yes	No	In 3D. Presented in 24fps and HFR (48fps). The final IMAX 3D 70mm DMR release on standard IMAX screens.
Dhoom 3	20 December 2013	No	Yes	No	First IMAX DMR Indian release. Selected territories only. Limited engagement.
Police Story 2013	24 December 2013	No	Yes	No	In 3D. China only.

== 2014 ==
Name	Release date	Format			Notes
Name	Release date	70mm	Digital	Laser	Notes
Jack Ryan: Shadow Recruit	17 January 2014	No	Yes	No	
I, Frankenstein	24 January 2014	No	Yes	No	In 3D (conversion). Aspect ratio opened up to 1.90:1 for the entire film.
The Monkey King	31 January 2014	No	Yes	No	In 3D. China only.
RoboCop	7 February 2014	No	Yes	No	In 2D. 3D (conversion) version in China only. 5-minute preview of 300: Rise of an Empire attached.
Galapagos: Nature's Wonderland	7 February 2014	No	Yes	No	In 3D. Selected territories only.
300: Rise of an Empire	7 March 2014	No	Yes	No	In 3D (conversion).
Need for Speed	14 March 2014	No	Yes	No	In 3D (conversion). Selected territories only. Limited engagement.
Divergent	21 March 2014	No	Yes	No	
Captain America: The Winter Soldier	26 March 2014	No	Yes	Yes	In 3D (conversion).
Noah	28 March 2014	No	Yes	No	Released in 2D in United States, Japan and United Kingdom. Released in 3D (conversion) in selected territories.
D-Day: Normandy 1944	28 March 2014	No	Yes	No	In 3D. Selected territories only.
Transcendence	18 April 2014	No	Yes	No	In 2D. 3D (conversion) version in China only.
The Amazing Spider-Man 2	2 May 2014	No	Yes	Yes	In 3D (conversion). Preserved on home media for IMAX Enhanced on Sony Pictures Core.
Coming Home	16 May 2014	No	Yes	No	China only.
Godzilla	16 May 2014	No	Yes	No	In 3D (conversion). The pre-show included a special version of the IMAX Countdown.
Maleficent	30 May 2014	No	Yes	No	In 3D (conversion).
Edge of Tomorrow	6 June 2014	No	Yes	No	In 3D (conversion).
How to Train Your Dragon 2	13 June 2014	No	Yes	Yes	In 3D.
Transformers: Age of Extinction	27 June 2014	No	Yes	Yes	In 3D. Filmed with Phantom 65 IMAX 3D Digital cameras. Select scenes filmed in 35mm and converted to 3D. First narrative feature to be partially filmed with IMAX 3D digital cameras with 95 minutes of IMAX 3D footage. Aspect ratio alternates between 2.39:1, 2.00:1, and 1.90:1 and preserved on home media for Blu-ray 3D. The longest IMAX 3D movie ever filmed.
Hercules	25 July 2014	No	Yes	No	In 3D (conversion).
Lucy	25 July 2014	No	Yes	No	Selected sequences filmed with IMAX cameras. Cropped to 2.39:1 aspect ratio. Selected territories only. 3D (conversion) version in China only.
The White Haired Witch of Lunar Kingdom	31 July 2014	No	Yes	No	In 3D (conversion). China only.
Guardians of the Galaxy	1 August 2014	No	Yes	Yes	In 3D (conversion). Aspect ratio opened up to 1.90:1 for 35 minutes of the film and preserved on home media for Blu-ray 3D & IMAX Enhanced on Disney+. Enhanced framing technique known as "Frame-Break" used to enhance CGI effects, making effects travel "outside" the screen.
The Expendables 3	1 September 2014	No	Yes	No	China only. Limited engagement.
Forrest Gump	5 September 2014	No	Yes	No	Originally released in 1994. Limited engagement.
Teenage Mutant Ninja Turtles	12 September 2014	No	Yes	No	In 3D (conversion). Expanded to select domestic theaters on 12 September 2014.
The Maze Runner	19 September 2014	No	Yes	Yes	
The Equalizer	26 September 2014	No	Yes	No	Limited engagement. Preserved on home media for IMAX Enhanced on Sony Pictures Core.
Breakup Buddies	30 September 2014	No	Yes	No	China only.
Bang Bang!	2 October 2014	No	Yes	No	India and selected territories only. Limited engagement.
Dracula Untold	10 October 2014	No	Yes	No	
Fury	17 October 2014	No	Yes	No	Selected territories only. Preserved on home media for IMAX Enhanced on Sony Pictures Core.
John Wick	24 October 2014	No	Yes	No	
Interstellar	7 November 2014	Yes	Yes	Yes	64 minutes shot with IMAX 65mm cameras. Presented in an expanded 1.43:1 aspect ratio for IMAX GT Venues and 1.90:1 for IMAX Digital. Home-Media (excl Streaming & DVD) retained the expanded Aspect Ratio in a cropped 1.78:1 (16:9) for IMAX scenes. The final worldwide IMAX 70mm DMR release for three years. Closing credits changed to slide format, and one closing credits song was omitted to reduce running time for IMAX 70mm prints. Re-released on 6 December 2024 for its 10th anniversary.
Big Hero 6	7 November 2014	No	Yes	Yes	In 3D. Preceded by the short film Feast.
Penguins of Madagascar	26 November 2014	No	Yes	No	In 3D. Selected territories only.
The Crossing: Part 1	2 December 2014	No	Yes	No	In 3D. China only.
Exodus: Gods and Kings	12 December 2014	No	Yes	No	In 3D (conversion).
The Hobbit: The Battle of the Five Armies	17 December 2014	No	Yes	Yes	In 3D. Presented in Standard 24fps and HFR (48fps). First feature film to be released in IMAX with Laser and IMAX with Laser 3D.
Seventh Son	17 December 2014	No	Yes	Yes	In 3D (conversion). Aspect ratio opened up to 1.90:1 for the opening sequence only.
Gone with the Bullets	18 December 2014	No	Yes	No	In 3D. Selected sequences filmed with Phantom 65 IMAX 3D Digital cameras. China only.
Night at the Museum: Secret of the Tomb	19 December 2014	No	Yes	No	

== 2015 ==
Name	Release date	Format			Notes
Name	Release date	70mm	Digital	Laser	Notes
Taken 3	9 January 2015	No	Yes	No	Selected territories only. 3D (conversion) version in China only.
American Sniper	16 January 2015	No	Yes	Yes	Limited engagement. Re-released in select North American IMAX theaters on 6 November 2020.
Kingsman: The Secret Service	29 January 2015	No	Yes	Yes	Selected territories only.
Game of Thrones	30 January 2015	No	Yes	Yes	TV series. Season 4, episodes 9 and 10. Limited engagement.
Jupiter Ascending	6 February 2015	No	Yes	Yes	In 3D (conversion).
Fifty Shades of Grey	13 February 2015	No	Yes	No	Limited engagement.
Dragon Blade	19 February 2015	No	Yes	No	In 3D (conversion). China only.
Wolf Totem	19 February 2015	No	Yes	Yes	In 3D. Selected territories only. Limited engagement.
Focus	27 February 2015	No	Yes	Yes	Limited engagement.
Chappie	6 March 2015	No	Yes	Yes	Limited engagement. Preserved on home media for IMAX Enhanced on Sony Pictures Core.
Cinderella	13 March 2015	No	Yes	No	Preceded by the short film Frozen Fever.
The Divergent Series: Insurgent	20 March 2015	No	Yes	Yes	In 3D (conversion).
Jean-Michel Cousteau's Secret Ocean	31 March 2015	No	Yes	Yes	In 3D and 2D. Selected territories only.
Furious 7	3 April 2015	No	Yes	Yes	Released in 2D in United States, United Kingdom, Australia, and selected territories. Released in 3D (conversion) in other territories. The pre-show included a special version of the IMAX Countdown.
Dragon Ball Z: Resurrection 'F'	18 April 2015	No	Yes	No	In 3D (conversion). First Japanese animated film to be released in IMAX 3D. Japan only.
The Water Diviner	24 April 2015	No	Yes	Yes	First IMAX DMR Australian release.
Avengers: Age of Ultron	1 May 2015	No	Yes	Yes	In 3D (conversion). 5-minute preview of Tomorrowland attached.
Mad Max: Fury Road	14 May 2015	No	Yes	Yes	In 3D (conversion). Re-released for one week on 11 September.
Tomorrowland	22 May 2015	No	Yes	Yes	Aspect ratio opened up to 1.90:1 for the entire film.
San Andreas	29 May 2015	No	Yes	Yes	In 3D (conversion).
Jurassic World	12 June 2015	No	Yes	Yes	In 3D (conversion). 5-minute preview of Ant-Man attached. Re-released for one week on 28 August.
Inside Out	19 June 2015	No	Yes	Yes	In 3D. Selected territories only. Preceded by the short film Lava.
Terminator Genisys	1 July 2015	No	Yes	Yes	In 3D (conversion). 5-minute preview of Mission: Impossible – Rogue Nation attached.
Monk Comes Down the Mountain	3 July 2015	No	Yes	No	In 3D (conversion). China only. The pre-show included a special version of the IMAX Countdown.
Minions	10 July 2015	No	Yes	Yes	In 3D. Selected territories only.
Monster Hunt	16 July 2015	No	Yes	Yes	In 3D (conversion). China only.
Ant-Man	17 July 2015	No	Yes	Yes	In 3D (conversion).
Pixels	24 July 2015	No	Yes	Yes	In 3D (conversion). Enhanced framing technique known as "Frame-Break" used to enhance CGI effects, making effects travel "outside" the screen. Preserved on home media for IMAX Enhanced on Sony Pictures Core.
Mission: Impossible – Rogue Nation	31 July 2015	No	Yes	Yes	The pre-show included a special version of the IMAX Countdown.
Attack on Titan	1 August 2015	No	Yes	No	First Japanese live-action film to be released in IMAX theaters. Selected territories only. Limited engagement.
To the Fore	7 August 2015	No	Yes	No	China only.
Go Away Mr. Tumor	13 August 2015	No	Yes	No	China only.
The Man from U.N.C.L.E.	14 August 2015	No	Yes	Yes	
The Transporter Refueled	4 September 2015	No	Yes	Yes	
Everest	18 September 2015	No	Yes	Yes	In 3D (conversion). Released a week early in IMAX theaters.
Maze Runner: The Scorch Trials	18 September 2015	No	Yes	Yes	In 3D (conversion). Japan only.
Attack on Titan: End of the World	19 September 2015	No	Yes	No	Selected territories only. Limited engagement.
Lost in Hong Kong	25 September 2015	No	Yes	No	China only.
The Walk	30 September 2015	No	Yes	Yes	In 3D (conversion). Released a week early in IMAX theaters. Preserved on home media for IMAX Enhanced on Sony Pictures Core.
Crimson Peak	16 October 2015	No	Yes	Yes	
The Martian	30 October 2015	No	Yes	Yes	In 3D. Re-released for one week only in IMAX theaters.
Spectre	6 November 2015	No	Yes	Yes	5-minute preview of The Hunger Games: Mockingjay - Part 2 attached.
The Hunger Games: Mockingjay - Part 2	20 November 2015	No	Yes	Yes	Released in 2D in North America. Released in 3D (conversion) in select territories.
In the Heart of the Sea	11 December 2015	No	Yes	Yes	In 3D (conversion).
Star Wars: The Force Awakens	18 December 2015	Yes	Yes	Yes	In 3D (conversion). 5-minute Millennium Falcon pursuit sequence shot with IMAX 65mm cameras with 1.43:1 aspect ratio for IMAX GT Venues and 1.90:1 aspect ratio for IMAX Digital.
Mojin: The Lost Legend	18 December 2015	No	Yes	Yes	In 3D. China only. Aspect ratio opened up to 1.90:1 for 50 minutes of underground tomb overrunning sequences.

== 2016 ==
Name	Release date	Format			Notes
Name	Release date	70mm	Digital	Laser	Notes
The Revenant	15 January 2016	No	Yes	Yes	Selected territories only. Limited engagement. Re-released on 26 February and 1 March 2026 for its 10th anniversary.
The Finest Hours	29 January 2016	No	Yes	Yes	In 3D (conversion).
Kung Fu Panda 3	29 January 2016	No	Yes	Yes	In 3D. Selected territories only.
Wild Africa	5 February 2016	Yes	Yes	Yes	In 3D. Selected territories only.
The Monkey King 2	8 February 2016	No	Yes	Yes	In 3D. China only. Enhanced framing technique known as "Frame-Break" used to enhance 3D effects, making effects travel "outside" the screen.
Deadpool	12 February 2016	No	Yes	Yes	
National Parks Adventure	12 February 2016	Yes	Yes	Yes	In 3D. Shot with 15-perf IMAX 3D 65mm cameras. Selected territories only.
Crouching Tiger, Hidden Dragon: Sword of Destiny	26 February 2016	No	Yes	Yes	3D (conversion) in China only. Released on Netflix the same day.
Gods of Egypt	26 February 2016	No	Yes	Yes	In 3D (conversion).
Zootopia	4 March 2016	No	Yes	Yes	In 3D.
10 Cloverfield Lane	11 March 2016	No	Yes	Yes	Limited engagement.
The Divergent Series: Allegiant	18 March 2016	No	Yes	Yes	5-minute preview of The Jungle Book attached.
Batman v Superman: Dawn of Justice	25 March 2016	Yes	Yes	Yes	In 3D (conversion) and 2D. 25 minutes shot with IMAX 65mm cameras. Presented in an expanded 1.43:1 aspect ratio for IMAX GT Venues and 1.90:1 aspect ratio for IMAX Digital. 2D 70mm version released on select screens.
The Jungle Book	15 April 2016	No	Yes	Yes	In 3D. Re-released for two weeks on 26 August.
Flight Crew	21 April 2016	No	Yes	Yes	In 3D. Aspect ratio opened up to 1.90:1 for the majority of the film. Russia, the CIS, and China only.
A Beautiful Planet	29 April 2016	Yes	Yes	Yes	In 3D and 2D.
Captain America: Civil War	6 May 2016	No	Yes	Yes	In 3D (conversion) and 2D. First American feature to be partially filmed with IMAX Arri Alexa cameras with 15 minutes of IMAX footage, presented in a 1.90:1 aspect ratio and preserved on home media for Blu-ray 3D & IMAX Enhanced on Disney+.
Alice Through the Looking Glass	27 May 2016	No	Yes	Yes	In 3D (conversion).
X-Men: Apocalypse	27 May 2016	No	Yes	Yes	In 3D and 2D. Selected territories only.
Teenage Mutant Ninja Turtles: Out of the Shadows	3 June 2016	No	Yes	Yes	In 3D (conversion).
Warcraft	10 June 2016	No	Yes	Yes	In 3D (conversion) and 2D.
Finding Dory	17 June 2016	No	Yes	Yes	In 3D. Preceded by the short film Piper.
Independence Day: Resurgence	24 June 2016	No	Yes	Yes	In 3D (conversion).
The BFG	1 July 2016	No	Yes	Yes	In 3D (conversion).
The Legend of Tarzan	1 July 2016	No	Yes	Yes	In 3D (conversion).
Cold War 2	8 July 2016	No	Yes	Yes	In 3D (conversion). China and Taiwan only.
The Secret Life of Pets	8 July 2016	No	Yes	Yes	In 3D. Preceded by the short film Mower Minions.
For a Few Bullets	15 July 2016	No	Yes	Yes	China only.
Ghostbusters	15 July 2016	No	Yes	Yes	In 3D (conversion). Enhanced framing technique known as "Frame-Break" used to enhance CGI effects, making effects travel "outside" the frame to fill entire 1.43:1 screen at IMAX GT Venues. 1 minute of climactic "portal" scene opened up to 1.85:1 aspect ratio for 3D (standard and IMAX) screenings. Home-Media retained the expanded Aspect Ratio in a cropped 1.78:1 (16:9) for the portal sequence & IMAX Enhanced on Sony Pictures Core.
Skiptrace	21 July 2016	No	Yes	Yes	In 3D (conversion). China only.
Ice Age: Collision Course	22 July 2016	No	Yes	Yes	In 3D. Selected territories only.
Star Trek Beyond	22 July 2016	No	Yes	Yes	In 3D (conversion).
Jason Bourne	29 July 2016	No	Yes	Yes	In 3D (conversion). Selected territories only. Expanded to select domestic theaters on 26 August.
League of Gods	29 July 2016	No	Yes	Yes	In 3D (conversion). China only.
Shin Godzilla	29 July 2016	No	Yes	Yes	Selected territories only.
Suicide Squad	5 August 2016	No	Yes	Yes	In 3D (conversion) and 2D. The pre-show included a special version of the IMAX Countdown.
Time Raiders	5 August 2016	No	Yes	Yes	In 3D (conversion). China only.
Ben-Hur	19 August 2016	No	Yes	Yes	In 3D (conversion) and 2D.
Sully	9 September 2016	No	Yes	Yes	Filmed almost entirely with IMAX Arri Alexa cameras. Aspect ratio opened up to 1.90:1 for the entire film. The pre-show included a special version of the IMAX Countdown.
My War	15 September 2016	No	Yes	Yes	In 3D (conversion). China only.
The Magnificent Seven	23 September 2016	No	Yes	Yes	
Storks	23 September 2016	No	Yes	Yes	In 3D. US, UK, China, and Thailand only.
The Duelist	29 September 2016	No	Yes	Yes	Russia and selected territories only.
Deepwater Horizon	30 September 2016	No	Yes	Yes	
L.O.R.D: Legend of Ravaging Dynasties	30 September 2016	No	Yes	Yes	In 3D. China only. The pre-show included a special version of the IMAX Countdown.
The Search for Life in Space	7 October 2016	Yes	Yes	Yes	In 3D.
Voyage of Time	7 October 2016	Yes	Yes	Yes	Aspect ratio 3.6:1 for select sequences.
Harry Potter and the Philosopher's Stone	13 October 2016	No	Yes	Yes	Originally released in 2001. Included in the re-release of the entire Harry Potter film series. Limited engagement. Re-released as 3D (conversion) in China in 2020.
Harry Potter and the Chamber of Secrets	13 October 2016	No	Yes	Yes	Originally released in 2002. Included in the re-release of the entire Harry Potter film series. Limited engagement.
Jack Reacher: Never Go Back	21 October 2016	No	Yes	Yes	
Inferno	28 October 2016	No	Yes	Yes	Preserved on home media for IMAX Enhanced on Sony Pictures Core.
Doctor Strange	4 November 2016	No	Yes	Yes	In 3D (conversion) and 2D. Aspect ratio opened up to 1.90:1 for 60 minutes of the film and preserved on home media for Blu-ray 3D & IMAX Enhanced on Disney+.
Fantastic Beasts and Where to Find Them	18 November 2016	No	Yes	Yes	In 3D (conversion) and 2D. Enhanced framing technique known as "Frame-Break" used to enhance 3D effects, making effects travel "outside" the screen.
La La Land	9 December 2016	No	Yes	Yes	Selected territories only. Limited engagement. Expanded to select domestic theaters on 13 January 2017 and was re-released on 3 February 2017.
Rogue One: A Star Wars Story	16 December 2016	Yes	Yes	Yes	In 3D (conversion). IMAX 70mm version released on select-screens. 5-minute preview of Dunkirk attached at IMAX GT 70mm, IMAX GT with Laser, and IMAX Digital locations.
The Great Wall	16 December 2016	No	Yes	Yes	In 3D (conversion) and 2D.
Assassin's Creed	21 December 2016	No	Yes	Yes	In 3D (conversion). Selected territories only. Limited engagement.

== 2017 ==
Name	Release date	Format			Notes
Name	Release date	70mm	Digital	Laser	Notes
Your Name	13 January 2017	No	Yes	Yes	Re-release in IMAX theaters. Originally released in 2016. Selected territories only. Limited engagement. Re-released on 23 August 2017 in selected territories, and re-released on 30 September 2022 in Japan.
xXx: Return of Xander Cage	20 January 2017	No	Yes	Yes	In 3D (conversion).
Attraction	26 January 2017	No	Yes	Yes	In 3D (conversion). Russia and the CIS only.
Resident Evil: The Final Chapter	27 January 2017	No	Yes	Yes	In 3D (conversion). Preserved on home media for IMAX Enhanced on Sony Pictures Core.
Journey to the West: The Demons Strike Back	28 January 2017	No	Yes	Yes	In 3D. Selected territories only.
The Lego Batman Movie	10 February 2017	No	Yes	Yes	Released in 2D in select territories. Released in 3D in other territories.
Dream Big	17 February 2017	Yes	Yes	Yes	In 3D. Filmed with 15-perf 70mm IMAX 3D cameras.
Sing	17 February 2017	No	Yes	Yes	In 3D. China and Japan only. Limited engagement.
Extreme Weather	24 February 2017	Yes	Yes	Yes	In 3D and 2D.
Logan	3 March 2017	No	Yes	Yes	
Kong: Skull Island	10 March 2017	No	Yes	Yes	In 3D (conversion). The pre-show included a special version of the IMAX Countdown.
Beauty and the Beast (2017)	17 March 2017	No	Yes	Yes	In 3D (conversion) and 2D. Aspect ratio opened up to 1.90:1 for the entire film.
Life	24 March 2017	No	Yes	Yes	Selected territories only. Limited engagement. Preserved on home media for IMAX Enhanced on Sony Pictures Core.
Ghost in the Shell (2017)	31 March 2017	No	Yes	Yes	In 3D (conversion).
The Fate of the Furious	14 April 2017	No	Yes	Yes	Released in 2D in North America and select territories. Released in 3D (conversion) in other territories. The pre-show included a special version of the IMAX countdown.
Baahubali 2: The Conclusion	28 April 2017	No	Yes	Yes	First IMAX DMR Telugu-language release. Aspect ratio opened up to 1.90:1 for the entire film. India and selected territories only. Limited engagement.
Battle of Memories	28 April 2017	No	Yes	Yes	China only.
Guardians of the Galaxy Vol. 2	5 May 2017	No	Yes	Yes	In 3D (conversion) and 2D. Aspect ratio opened up to 1.90:1 for 40 minutes of the film and preserved on home media for Blu-ray 3D (for the Best Buy Exclusive 4K Steelbook) & IMAX Enhanced on Disney+. Enhanced framing technique known as "Frame-Break" used to enhance 3D effects, making effects travel "outside" the screen.
Alien: Covenant	19 May 2017	No	Yes	Yes	Aspect ratio opened up to 1.90:1 for the entire film on select-screens.
Pirates of the Caribbean: Dead Men Tell No Tales	26 May 2017	No	Yes	Yes	In 3D (conversion) and 2D. Aspect ratio opened up to 1.90:1 for the entire film.
Wonder Woman	2 June 2017	No	Yes	Yes	In 3D (conversion) and 2D. Re-released for one week only on 25 August 2017 in select territories.
The Mummy	9 June 2017	No	Yes	Yes	In 3D (conversion).
Mountain	12 June 2017	No	Yes	Yes	
Cars 3	16 June 2017	No	Yes	Yes	Released in 2D in North America and select territories. Released in 3D in other territories. Preceded by the short film Lou.
Transformers: The Last Knight	21 June 2017	No	Yes	Yes	In 3D. Filmed almost entirely with IMAX Arri Alexa cameras in 3D rigs. Aspect ratio alternates between 1.90:1, 2.00:1, and 2.39:1 throughout the entire film.
Despicable Me 3	30 June 2017	No	Yes	Yes	Selected territories only. Limited engagement. 3D version in selected territories only.
Spider-Man: Homecoming	7 July 2017	No	Yes	Yes	In 3D (conversion) and 2D. The pre-show included a special version of the IMAX Countdown. Preserved on home media for IMAX Enhanced on Sony Pictures Core.
Wu Kong	13 July 2017	No	Yes	Yes	In 3D (conversion). China only.
Dunkirk	21 July 2017	Yes	Yes	Yes	80 minutes shot with IMAX 65mm cameras. IMAX 70mm version shown in 35 theaters globally. Presented in an expanded 1.43:1 aspect ratio for IMAX GT Venues (70mm & Laser) and 1.90:1 aspect ratio for IMAX Digital. Home-Media (excl Streaming) retained the expanded Aspect Ratio in a cropped 1.78:1 (16:9) for IMAX scenes.
Valerian and the City of a Thousand Planets	21 July 2017	No	Yes	Yes	In 3D (conversion). Selected territories only.
The Founding of an Army	27 July 2017	No	Yes	Yes	China only.
Atomic Blonde	28 July 2017	No	Yes	Yes	Selected territories only. Limited engagement.
Once Upon a Time	3 August 2017	No	Yes	Yes	In 3D (conversion). China only.
The Adventurers	11 August 2017	No	Yes	Yes	China only.
Legend of the Naga Pearls	11 August 2017	No	Yes	Yes	In 3D. China only.
Wolf Warrior 2	14 August 2017	No	Yes	Yes	Re-released in IMAX theaters. China and selected territories only.
War for the Planet of the Apes	18 August 2017	No	Yes	Yes	Selected territories only. Limited engagement. 2D version in South Korea, North America and Japan. 3D (conversion) in China and Japan.
Inhumans	1 September 2017	No	Yes	Yes	TV series. The first two episodes were filmed with Arri Alexa IMAX cameras and released in IMAX theaters four weeks before they debuted on ABC. IMAX version is 10 minutes shorter than the ABC version. Limited engagement.
Amazon Adventure	8 September 2017	Yes	Yes	Yes	In 3D.
It	8 September 2017	No	Yes	Yes	Re-released in select North American IMAX theaters on 28 October 2020.
Blade Runner: The Final Cut	20 September 2017	No	Yes	Yes	Originally released in 1982. Selected territories only. Limited engagement. Re-released in select North American IMAX theatres on 26 June 2020.
Kingsman: The Golden Circle	22 September 2017	No	Yes	Yes	Released in 2D in select territories. Released in 3D (conversion) in other territories. Aspect ratio opened up to 1.90:1 for 10 minutes of the film.
American Made	29 September 2017	No	Yes	Yes	Selected territories only. Limited engagement.
Ajin: Demi-Human	30 September 2017	No	Yes	Yes	Japan only.
The Foreigner	30 September 2017	No	Yes	Yes	Released in 2D in North America. Released in 3D (conversion) in China.
Never Say Die	30 September 2017	No	Yes	Yes	China only.
Blade Runner 2049	6 October 2017	No	Yes	Yes	Released in 2D in North America and South Korea. Released in 3D (conversion) in selected territories. Aspect ratio opened up to 1.90:1 for the entire film. The pre-show included a special version of the IMAX Countdown. The DMR process was not used for the film, instead a custom transfer was made.
Hurricane	11 October 2017	Yes	Yes	Yes	In 3D. Selected territories only.
Salyut-7	12 October 2017	No	Yes	Yes	In 3D (conversion). Russia and the CIS only.
Bad Genius	13 October 2017	No	Yes	Yes	China only. First IMAX DMR Thai release.
Geostorm	20 October 2017	No	Yes	Yes	In 3D (conversion).
Only the Brave	20 October 2017	No	Yes	Yes	Selected territories only. Limited engagement. Aspect ratio opened up to 1.90:1 for the entire film. Preserved on home media Locked to 2.39:1 for IMAX Enhanced on Sony Pictures Core.
Jigsaw	27 October 2017	No	Yes	Yes	Limited engagement.
Thor: Ragnarok	3 November 2017	No	Yes	Yes	In 3D (conversion) and 2D. Aspect ratio opened up to 1.90:1 for 40 minutes of the film and preserved on home media for Blu-ray 3D (in the UK) & IMAX Enhanced on Disney+.
Paddington 2	10 November 2017	No	Yes	Yes	Selected territories only.
Justice League	17 November 2017	No	Yes	Yes	Released in 2D in North America. Released in 3D (conversion) in selected territories.
Furious	30 November 2017	No	Yes	Yes	Russia and the CIS only.
Coco	1 December 2017	No	Yes	Yes	Released 2D in North America. Released 3D in other territories. Preceded by the short film Olaf's Frozen Adventure.
Fullmetal Alchemist	1 December 2017	No	Yes	Yes	Japan only.
The Disaster Artist	8 December 2017	No	Yes	Yes	Limited engagement.
Star Wars: The Last Jedi	15 December 2017	Yes	Yes	Yes	In 3D (conversion). 40 minutes shot with IMAX 65mm cameras, projected in 2.39:1 on all screens. IMAX 70mm DMR version released on 10 screens in the United States, one in Canada, and one in the United Kingdom.
The Thousand Faces of Dunjia	15 December 2017	No	Yes	Yes	In 3D. China only.
Youth	15 December 2017	No	Yes	Yes	China only.
The Greatest Showman	20 December 2017	No	Yes	Yes	Selected territories only. Expanded to select domestic theaters on 2 February 2018.
Jumanji: Welcome to the Jungle	20 December 2017	No	Yes	Yes	In 3D (conversion). Selected territories only. Expanded to select domestic theaters in 2D on 12 January 2018. Preserved on home media for IMAX Enhanced on Sony Pictures Core.
Legend of the Demon Cat	22 December 2017	No	Yes	Yes	China only.
Bleeding Steel	22 December 2017	No	Yes	Yes	In 3D (conversion). China only.

== 2018 ==
Name	Release date	Format			Notes
Name	Release date	70mm	Digital	Laser	Notes
The Commuter	12 January 2018	No	Yes	Yes	Limited engagement.
12 Strong	19 January 2018	No	Yes	Yes	
Padmaavat	25 January 2018	No	Yes	Yes	In 3D (conversion). First Indian film to be released in IMAX 3D. Selected territories only.
Maze Runner: The Death Cure	26 January 2018	No	Yes	Yes	Released in 2D in North America, Japan, China, and London. Released in 3D (conversion) in other territories. Aspect ratio opened up to 1.90:1 for the entire film.
Fifty Shades Freed	9 February 2018	No	Yes	Yes	.
America's Musical Journey	16 February 2018	Yes	Yes	Yes	In 3D and 2D. Selected territories only.
Black Panther	16 February 2018	No	Yes	Yes	In 3D (conversion) and 2D. Aspect ratio opened up to 1.90:1 for 50 minutes of the film and preserved on home media for Blu-ray 3D (in the UK) & IMAX Enhanced on Disney+.
Operation Red Sea	16 February 2018	No	Yes	Yes	In 3D (conversion). China only.
Monster Hunt 2	16 February 2018	No	Yes	Yes	China only.
Detective Chinatown 2	16 February 2018	No	Yes	Yes	China only.
Red Sparrow	2 March 2018	No	Yes	Yes	
A Wrinkle in Time	9 March 2018	No	Yes	Yes	Released in 2D in North America. Released in 3D (conversion) in selected territories.
Raid	16 March 2018	No	Yes	No	India and selected territories.
Tomb Raider	16 March 2018	No	Yes	Yes	Released in 2D in North America, Japan, and London. Released in 3D (conversion) in other territories.
Pacific Rim Uprising	23 March 2018	No	Yes	Yes	In 3D (conversion) and 2D.
Ready Player One	29 March 2018	No	Yes	Yes	In 3D (conversion) and 2D.
Pandas	6 April 2018	Yes	Yes	Yes	In 3D and 2D. Filmed with IMAX Arri Alexa cameras. Re-released in select territories on 24 August 2018.
Taxi 5	11 April 2018	No	Yes	Yes	France and Japan only.
Rampage	13 April 2018	No	Yes	Yes	Released in 2D in North America. Released in 3D (conversion) in selected territories.
Avengers: Infinity War	27 April 2018	No	Yes	Yes	In 3D (conversion) and 2D. First American feature film to be entirely filmed with IMAX Arri Alexa cameras equipped with Panavision Sphero 65 and Ultra Panavision 70 lenses in 3D rigs. Expanded 1.90:1 aspect ratio for entire runtime and preserved on home media for IMAX Enhanced on Disney+.
A or B	28 April 2018	No	Yes	Yes	China only.
Deadpool 2	18 May 2018	No	Yes	Yes	
Backyard Wilderness	24 May 2018	Yes	Yes	Yes	In 3D and 2D. Selected territories only.
Solo: A Star Wars Story	25 May 2018	No	Yes	Yes	In 3D (conversion) and 2D.
Ocean's 8	7 June 2018	No	Yes	Yes	Selected territories only. Limited engagement.
The Incredibles	13 June 2018	No	Yes	Yes	Originally released in 2004. Only screening as part of a double feature with Incredibles 2 for one-night-only.
Incredibles 2	15 June 2018	No	Yes	Yes	Released in 2D in North America and selected territories. Released in 3D in other territories. Preceded by the short film Bao.
Jurassic World: Fallen Kingdom	22 June 2018	No	Yes	Yes	In 3D (conversion) and 2D. Exclusive preview of Mission: Impossible – Fallout attached.
The Trolley	23 June 2018	No	Yes	No	Selected territories only.
Aircraft Carrier: Guardians of the Sea	23 June 2018	Yes	Yes	Yes	Selected territories only.
Animal World	29 June 2018	No	Yes	Yes	In 3D (conversion). China only.
Turtle Odyssey	30 June 2018	No	Yes	Yes	In 3D and 2D. Selected territories only.
Dying to Survive	5 July 2018	No	Yes	Yes	China only.
Ant-Man and the Wasp	6 July 2018	No	Yes	Yes	In 3D (conversion) and 2D. Aspect ratio opened up to 1.90:1 for 30 minutes of the film and preserved on home media for Blu-ray 3D (in the UK) & IMAX Enhanced on Disney+. Exclusive preview of Mission: Impossible – Fallout attached.
Hidden Man	13 July 2018	No	Yes	Yes	China only.
Skyscraper	13 July 2018	No	Yes	Yes	In 3D (conversion) and 2D.
The Equalizer 2	20 July 2018	No	Yes	Yes	Limited engagement. Released in an IMAX Enhanced version on 4K Blu-ray on 14 November 2023. Preserved on home media for IMAX Enhanced on Sony Pictures Core.
Mamma Mia! Here We Go Again	20 July 2018	No	Yes	Yes	
Mission: Impossible – Fallout	27 July 2018	No	Yes	Yes	Released in 2D in North America and selected territories. Released in 3D (conversion) in other territories. Aspect ratio opened up to 1.90:1 for 20 minutes of the film. Exclusive preview of First Man attached.
Detective Dee: The Four Heavenly Kings	27 July 2018	No	Yes	Yes	In 3D (conversion). China, Australia, and New Zealand only. Aspect ratio opened up to 1.90:1 for the entire film.
Hello Mr. Billionaire	27 July 2018	No	Yes	Yes	China only.
Along with the Gods: The Last 49 Days	1 August 2018	No	Yes	Yes	South Korea, Hong Kong, and Taiwan only. Limited engagement.
The Meg	10 August 2018	No	Yes	Yes	Released in 2D in North America and select territories. Released in 3D (conversion) in other territories.
Gold	15 August 2018	No	Yes	No	Selected territories only. Limited engagement.
Alpha	17 August 2018	No	Yes	Yes	In 3D (conversion) and 2D. Limited engagement. Preserved on home media for IMAX Enhanced on Sony Pictures Core.
Mile 22	17 August 2018	No	Yes	Yes	Selected territories only. Limited engagement.
Europe Raiders	17 August 2018	No	Yes	Yes	China only.
2001: A Space Odyssey	24 August 2018	Yes	Yes	Yes	Originally released in 1968. IMAX 70mm version shown in 5 theaters in North America. Limited engagement.
Iron Man	30 August 2018	No	Yes	Yes	Originally released in 2008. Aspect ratio opened up to 1.90:1 for select sequences and preserved on home media for IMAX Enhanced on Disney+. A part of the Marvel Studios 10th Anniversary IMAX Film Festival. Limited engagement.
The Incredible Hulk	30 August 2018	No	Yes	Yes	Originally released in 2008. A part of the Marvel Studios 10th Anniversary IMAX Film Festival. Limited engagement.
Captain America: The First Avenger	31 August 2018	No	Yes	Yes	Originally released in 2011 in 3D (conversion). A part of the Marvel Studios 10th Anniversary IMAX Film Festival. Limited engagement.
Kin	31 August 2018	No	Yes	Yes	Selected territories only. Limited engagement.
The Nun	7 September 2018	No	Yes	Yes	
The Predator	14 September 2018	No	Yes	Yes	Released in 2D in North America and select territories. Released in 3D (conversion) in other territories.
Australia's Great Wild North	14 September 2018	Yes	Yes	Yes	
Michael Jackson's Thriller 3D	21 September 2018	No	Yes	Yes	In 3D (conversion). Originally released in 1983. Screened before The House with A Clock in Its Walls during its first week. Exclusive to North America.
The House with A Clock in Its Walls	21 September 2018	No	Yes	Yes	Released in 2D in North America and selected territories. Released in 3D (conversion) in other territories. Attached Michael Jackson's Thriller 3D music video in North America for the first week only.
Golden Job	21 September 2018	No	Yes	Yes	China only.
Hello, Mrs. Money	30 September 2018	No	Yes	Yes	China only.
Shadow	30 September 2018	No	Yes	Yes	China only.
Project Gutenberg	30 September 2018	No	Yes	Yes	China only.
Venom	5 October 2018	No	Yes	Yes	In 3D (conversion) and 2D. Preserved on home media for IMAX Enhanced on Sony Pictures Core.
First Man	12 October 2018	No	Yes	Yes	10-minute Lunar Sequence shot with IMAX 65mm cameras and presented in a 1.43:1 aspect ratio for IMAX GT Venues with Laser and 1.90:1 aspect ratio for IMAX Digital. Debuted at the Toronto International Film Festival in IMAX at the Ontario Place Cinesphere on 9 September 2018. Home-Media retained the expanded Aspect Ratio in a cropped 1.78:1 (16:9) for the Lunar Sequence.
Halloween	26 October 2018	No	Yes	Yes	Re-released for one week only in IMAX theaters. Limited engagement. Re-released in select North American IMAX theaters on 28 October 2020.
Volcanoes – The Fires of Creation	October 2018	No	Yes	Yes	In 3D (conversion) and 2D. Selected territories only.
Bohemian Rhapsody	2 November 2018	No	Yes	Yes	Released two days early in select IMAX theaters.
Thugs of Hindostan	8 November 2018	No	Yes	Yes	India and selected territories only.
Overlord	9 November 2018	No	Yes	Yes	Selected territories only.
Dr. Seuss' The Grinch	9 November 2018	No	Yes	Yes	Released in 2D in North America. Released in 3D in selected territories.
Fantastic Beasts: The Crimes of Grindelwald	16 November 2018	No	Yes	Yes	Released in 2D in North America and select territories. Released in 3D (conversion) in other territories. Enhanced framing technique known as "Frame-Break" used to enhance 3D effects, making effects travel "outside" the frame.
Ralph Breaks the Internet	21 November 2018	No	Yes	Yes	Released in 2D in North America. Released in 3D in selected territories. Limited engagement.
Creed II	29 November 2018	No	Yes	Yes	Re-released in IMAX theaters. Selected territories only. Limited engagement.
A Star Is Born	7 December 2018	No	Yes	Yes	Re-released in IMAX theaters. Selected territories only. Limited engagement.
Mortal Engines	14 December 2018	No	Yes	Yes	In 3D (conversion) and 2D.
Spider-Man: Into the Spider-Verse	14 December 2018	No	Yes	Yes	In 3D and 2D. Preserved on home media for IMAX Enhanced on Sony Pictures Core.
Dragon Ball Super: Broly	14 December 2018	No	Yes	Yes	Selected territories only. Limited engagement. Released for one-day-only screenings in North America on 16 January 2019.
Aquaman	21 December 2018	No	Yes	Yes	In 3D (conversion) and 2D. Aspect ratio opened up to 1.90:1 for 90 minutes of the film.
Bumblebee	21 December 2018	No	Yes	Yes	In 3D (conversion) and 2D.
Mary Poppins Returns	21 December 2018	No	Yes	Yes	Selected territories only. Limited engagement.
Airpocalypse	21 December 2018	No	Yes	Yes	China only.
Master Z: The Ip Man Legacy	21 December 2018	No	Yes	Yes	China only.
Kung Fu Monster	21 December 2018	No	Yes	Yes	China only.
T-34	27 December 2018	No	Yes	Yes	Russia, the CIS only. Japan 109 Cinema has a limited one-week engagement on 15 November 2019.
Mojin: The Worm Valley	29 December 2018	No	Yes	Yes	In 3D (conversion). China only.

== 2019 ==
Name	Release date	Format			Notes
Name	Release date	70mm	Digital	Laser	Notes
Free Solo	10 January 2019	No	Yes	Yes	Re-released in IMAX theaters. Limited engagement.
Glass	18 January 2019	No	Yes	Yes	
The Wandering Earth	5 February 2019	No	Yes	Yes	In 3D (conversion) and 2D. China, New Zealand and limited three-day release in North America only.
Crazy Alien	5 February 2019	No	Yes	Yes	China only.
Pegasus	5 February 2019	No	Yes	Yes	China only.
The Lego Movie 2: The Second Part	8 February 2019	No	Yes	Yes	Released in 2D in North America. Released in 3D in selected territories.
Alita: Battle Angel	14 February 2019	No	Yes	Yes	In 3D and 2D. Filmed with the Fusion Camera System. Aspect ratio opened up to 1.90:1 for 40 minutes of the film. Re-released in select North American IMAX theaters on 28 October 2020.
Great Bear Rainforest	15 February 2019	Yes	Yes	Yes	In 3D and 2D. Selected territories only.
How to Train Your Dragon: The Hidden World	22 February 2019	No	Yes	Yes	Released in 2D in North America and select territories. Released in 3D in other territories.
Dilan 1991	28 February 2019				First IMAX DMR Indonesian release. Limited engagement.
Apollo 11	1 March 2019	Yes	Yes	Yes	Limited engagement. Re-released in select IMAX theaters on 6 December 2019. The shortened "First Steps" version was the only version to be released on IMAX 70mm.
Captain Marvel	8 March 2019	No	Yes	Yes	Released in 2D in North America and England. Released in 3D (conversion) in other territories. Aspect ratio opened up to 1.90:1 for 35 minutes of the film and preserved on home media for IMAX Enhanced on Disney+.
Superpower Dogs	15 March 2019	No	Yes	Yes	In 3D and 2D.
Us	22 March 2019	No	Yes	Yes	Selected territories only. Limited engagement.
Dumbo	29 March 2019	No	Yes	Yes	Released in 2D in North America, Japan, and South Korea. Released in 3D (conversion) in other territories.
Shazam!	5 April 2019	No	Yes	Yes	Released in 2D in North America and Japan. Released in 3D (conversion) in other territories. Exclusive 5-minute preview of Godzilla: King of the Monsters attached.
Hellboy	12 April 2019	No	Yes	Yes	
Penguins	17 April 2019	No	Yes	Yes	
The Curse of La Llorona	19 April 2019	No	Yes	Yes	Limited engagement. Exclusive 5-minute preview of Godzilla: King of the Monsters attached.
Avengers: Endgame	26 April 2019	No	Yes	Yes	In 3D (conversion) and 2D. Filmed entirely with IMAX Arri Alexa cameras equipped with Panavision Sphero 65 & Ultra Panavision 70 lenses in 3D rigs. Presented in an expanded 1.90:1 aspect ratio for the entire film. Exclusive 5-minute preview of Godzilla: King of the Monsters attached at AMC Theatres locations in the US. Expanded 1.90:1 aspect ratio for entire runtime and preserved on home media for IMAX Enhanced on Disney+. Re-released on 25 September 2026 in 3D (conversion) and 2D.
Pokémon Detective Pikachu	10 May 2019	No	Yes	Yes	In 3D (conversion) and 2D.
John Wick: Chapter 3 – Parabellum	17 May 2019	No	Yes	Yes	Selected territories only. Limited engagement.
Aladdin	24 May 2019	No	Yes	Yes	In 3D (conversion) and 2D.
Godzilla: King of the Monsters	31 May 2019	No	Yes	Yes	Released in 2D in North America. Released in 3D (conversion) in selected territories.
Dark Phoenix	7 June 2019	No	Yes	Yes	Released in 2D in North America. Released in 3D (conversion) in selected territories.
Men in Black: International	14 June 2019	No	Yes	Yes	Released in 2D in North America. Released in 3D (conversion) in selected territories. Preserved on home media for IMAX Enhanced on Sony Pictures Core.
Toy Story 4	21 June 2019	No	Yes	Yes	Released in 2D in North America and Japan. Released in 3D in selected territories.
Annabelle Comes Home	26 June 2019	No	Yes	Yes	Limited engagement.
Secrets of the Universe	28 June 2019	Yes	Yes	Yes	15/70mm and Digital release.
Soundgarden: Live from the Artists Den	1 July 2019	No	Yes	Yes	One-night-only engagement.
Spider-Man: Far From Home	2 July 2019	No	Yes	Yes	In 3D (conversion) and 2D. Aspect ratio opened up to 1.90:1 for 45 minutes of the film and preserved on home media for IMAX Enhanced on Sony Pictures Core and Disney+. Re-released as an extended cut on 30 August with aspect ratio opened up to 1.90:1 for 50 minutes of the film.
The Lion King (2019)	19 July 2019	No	Yes	Yes	In 3D and 2D. Filmed entirely with IMAX Arri Alexa cameras. Aspect ratio opened up to 1.43:1 for 25 minutes of musical sequences on select IMAX with Laser GT Venues.
Weathering with You	19 July 2019	No	Yes	Yes	Japan and selected territories only. Released in North America for a limited one-week engagement on 31 January 2020. Re-released on 30 September 2022 in Japan.
Ne Zha	26 July 2019	No	Yes	Yes	In 3D. China only. Released in North America and the UK for a limited one-week engagement on 30 August 2019. Released in Thailand on 5 December 2019.
Looking Up	26 July 2019	No	Yes	Yes	China only.
Exit	31 July 2019	No	Yes	Yes	South Korea only.
The Bravest	1 August 2019	No	Yes	Yes	China only.
Fast & Furious Presents: Hobbs & Shaw	2 August 2019	No	Yes	Yes	Released in 2D in North America. Released in 3D (conversion) in selected territories.
Once Upon a Time in Hollywood	8 August 2019	No	Yes	Yes	Re-released in IMAX theaters. Selected territories only. Limited engagement.
BoBoiBoy Movie 2	8 August 2019	No	Yes	Yes	First IMAX DMR for Malaysian in 3D. Limited engagement.
Shanghai Fortress	9 August 2019	No	Yes	Yes	In 3D (conversion). China only.
Apocalypse Now: Final Cut	13 August 2019	No	Yes	Yes	Originally released in 1979. Selected territories only. Limited engagement. Released in North America for a two-day engagement on 15 and 18 August 2019.
Saaho	30 August 2019	No	Yes	Yes	Aspect ratio opened up to 1.90:1 for the entire film. India and selected territories only. Limited engagement.
It: Chapter Two	6 September 2019	No	Yes	Yes	
Jade Dynasty	12 September 2019	No	Yes	Yes	China only.
Viy 2: Journey to China	12 September 2019	No	Yes	Yes	In 3D. Russia and selected territories only.
Australia: The Wild Top End	12 September 2019	No	Yes	Yes	In 3D (conversion). Australia only.
Ad Astra	20 September 2019	No	Yes	Yes	
The Climbers	30 September 2019	No	Yes	Yes	China only. Released in North America and UK for a four-day engagement between 30 September and 3 October 2019.
My People, My Country	30 September 2019	No	Yes	Yes	China only.
The Captain	30 September 2019	No	Yes	Yes	China only.
Joker	4 October 2019	No	Yes	Yes	Exclusive 5-minute preview of Terminator: Dark Fate attached. Re-released in select IMAX theaters on 6 December 2019.
Gemini Man	11 October 2019	No	Yes	Yes	Shown in 3D HFR (60fps) at 100 IMAX with Laser Venues worldwide. Shown in 2D at 24fps at all additional IMAX theaters.
Maleficent: Mistress of Evil	18 October 2019	No	Yes	Yes	Released in 2D in North America and select territories. Released in 3D (conversion) in other territories. Aspect ratio opened up to 1.90:1 for the entire film.
Jesus is King	25 October 2019	No	Yes	Yes	Limited engagement.
Terminator: Dark Fate	1 November 2019	No	Yes	Yes	
The Aeronauts	1 November 2019	No	Yes	Yes	Aspect ratio opened up to 1.90:1 for 60 minutes of the film. UK only. Released in China on 13 November 2020.
Doctor Sleep	8 November 2019	No	Yes	Yes	Limited engagement.
Ford v Ferrari	15 November 2019	No	Yes	Yes	Re-released in select North American IMAX theaters on 26 June 2020.
Charlie's Angels	15 November 2019	No	Yes	Yes	Selected territories only. Limited engagement. Released in an IMAX Enhanced version on 4K Blu-ray on 10 March 2020. Preserved on home media for IMAX Enhanced on Sony Pictures Core.
Frozen 2	22 November 2019	No	Yes	Yes	Released in 2D in North America and selected territories. Released in 3D in other territories.
Wings Over Everest	29 November 2019	No	Yes	Yes	In 3D (conversion). China only.
Jumanji: The Next Level	13 December 2019	No	Yes	Yes	Released in 2D in North America. Released in 3D (conversion) in select territories. Released in an IMAX Enhanced version on 4K Blu-ray on 17 March 2020. Preserved on home media for IMAX Enhanced on Sony Pictures Core.
Sheep Without a Shepherd	13 December 2019	No	Yes	Yes	China only.
Star Wars: The Rise of Skywalker	20 December 2019	No	Yes	Yes	In 3D (conversion) and 2D. An exclusive 5-minute prologue preview of Tenet was attached at select IMAX theaters, with the prologue being shown in an expanded 1.43:1 aspect ratio at select IMAX GT Venues (Film & Laser) including 5 in the US and one in the UK.
