= Sony Xperia 5 V =

Japanese flagship smartphone

Xperia 5 V
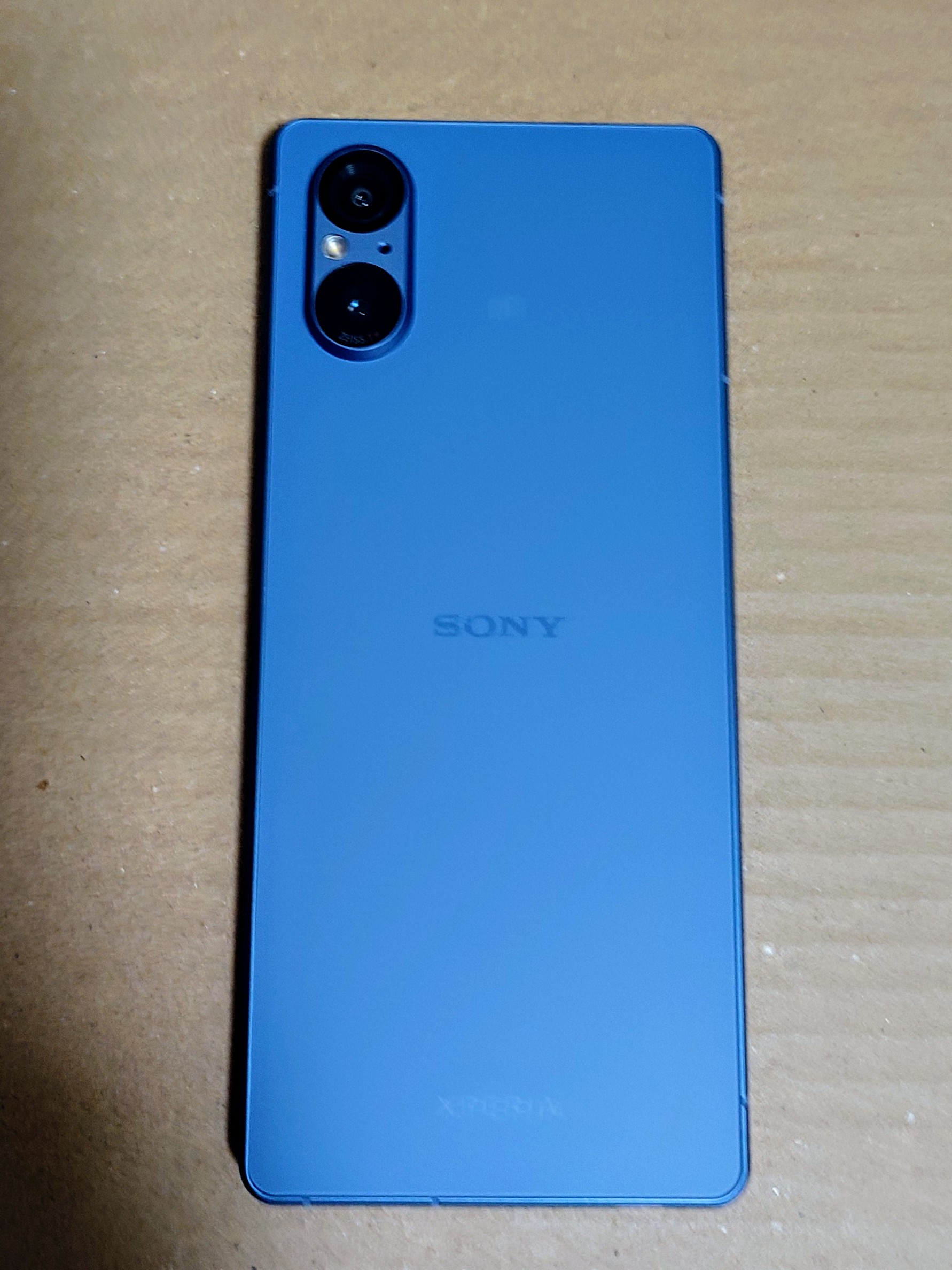
- Sony Xperia 5 V in Blue colorway
- Also known as: Sony Xperia 5 Mark V
- Brand: Sony
- Developer: Sony
- Manufacturer: Sony Mobile
- Type: Smartphone
- Series: Xperia
- Family: Sony Xperia 5 series
- First released: October 13, 2023; 3 years ago
- Availability by region: Japan; United Kingdom; Taiwan; Hong Kong; Germany; Austria; Malaysia
- Predecessor: Sony Xperia 5 IV
- Successor: Sony Xperia 10 VII (indirect)
- Related: Sony Xperia 1 V Sony Xperia 10 V
- Compatible networks: 5G; 4G; 3.9G
- Form factor: Slate
- Colors: Black, Blue, Platinum Silver
- Dimensions: 154 mm (6.1 in) H 68 mm (2.7 in) W 8.6 mm (0.34 in) D
- Weight: 182 g (6.4 oz)
- Operating system: Android 13 (Upgradable to Android 15); Up to 2 years of OS upgrades and 3 years of security updates
- System-on-chip: Qualcomm Snapdragon 8 Gen 2
- CPU: Octa-core (1x 3.2 GHz Cortex-X3, 2x 2.8 GHz Cortex-A715, 2x 2.8 GHz Cortex-A710, 3x 2.0 GHz Cortex-A510)
- GPU: Adreno 740
- Modem: Qualcomm Snapdragon X70 5G
- Memory: LPDDR5X RAM; 8 GB
- Storage: Universal Flash Storage (UFS 3.1); 128 GB; 256 GB
- Removable storage: microSDXC (up to 1TB)
- SIM: nanoSIM, eSIM, 1 nanoSIM + 1 eSIM, 1 nanoSIM + 1 nanoSIM
- Battery: Non-removable lithium-ion battery 5000 mAh, 18.91 Wh
- Charging: Fast Charging USB PD 3.1 30 W Charging; Qi 11 W Wireless Charging
- Rear camera: 48 MP, f/1.9, 24mm (wide), 1/1.35", 1.12µm, dual pixel PDAF, OIS (Sony Exmor T IMX888/Lytia LYT-800); 12 MP, f/2.2, 16mm (ultrawide), 1/2.5", dual pixel PDAF (Sony Exmor RS IMX563); Features Zeiss optics, Zeiss T* lens coating, color spectrum sensor, LED flash, panorama, HDR, eye tracking Video: 4K@24/25/30/60/120fps HDR, 1080p@30/60/120fps; 5-axis gyro-EIS, OIS, HDR
- Front camera: 12 MP, f/2.0, 24mm (wide), 1/2.9", 1.25µm (Sony Exmor RS IMX663) Features HDR Video: 4K@30fps, 1080p@30/60fps, 5-axis gyro-EIS
- Display: 6.1 in (150 mm) OLED; Full HD+ (2520×1080 pixels); CinemaWide display 120Hz refresh rate HDR support Gorilla Glass Victus 2
- Sound: Front Full-stage stereo speakers and 3.5 mm headphone jack 4 Pole; Cirrus Logic Speaker Amp x2 High-Resolution Audio; High-Resolution Audio Wireless; 360 Reality Audio hardware decoding Dolby Atmos tuned by Sony Pictures and Sony Music; DSEE Ultimate; Stereo Recording; SBC; AAC; Qualcomm aptX; Qualcomm aptX HD; Qualcomm aptX adaptive Qualcomm aptX TWS+ LDAC
- Media: Game Enhancer, Sony Pictures Core, Music, Video Editor App
- Connectivity: Wi-Fi 802.11 a/b/g/n/ac/ax (2.4/5GHz); Bluetooth 5.3; USB-C 3.2 Gen 1 (supports DisplayPort); NFC; GPS with Assisted GPS; Galileo; GLONASS; BeiDou
- Data inputs: Sensors: Accelerometer; Barometer; Fingerprint scanner (side-mounted, always on); Gyroscope; Proximity sensor; Compass
- Water resistance: Water and dust resistant (IP65/IP68)
- Model: XQ-DE54
- Development status: Released, Discontinued
- Made in: Thailand
- Other: Native Sony Alpha support IP65/IP68 Water/dust resistant PS5 Remote Play; DUALSENSE® Control compatibility Game Enhancer
- Website: www.sony.jp/xperia/xperia/xperia5m5/

The Sony Xperia 5 V (pronounced Mark 5 in "V") is a flagship Android-based smartphone developed and marketed by Sony, supporting 5G mobile networks. It was announced on September 1, 2023, and released on October 13, 2023. The Sony Xperia 5 V marks the final Xperia 5 series, as Sony didn't release Mark VI of the Xperia 5 series in 2024. Unlike its predecessor, the Sony Xperia 5 IV, or its bigger siblings, the Sony Xperia 1 V, it wasn't sold in the US market.

== Specifications ==
In this model, the telephoto camera has been removed. It features a 6.1-inch FHD+ OLED HDR BT.2020 display with a 120 Hz refresh rate and Sony's standard 21:9 aspect ratio, intended to allow 21:9 cinematic video content to render natively without letterboxing. While physically smaller than the Xperia 1 V, the display size remains substantially larger than that of earlier models in the Sony Xperia Compact series. It no longer has the notification LED present in its subsequent predecessor.

Similar to the Xperia 1 V, the device is powered by the Qualcomm Snapdragon 8 Gen 2 system-on-chip, paired with 8 GB of LPDDR5X RAM and 128 GB or 256 GB of UFS 3.1 expandable storage.
