= Sony Xperia 5 III =

Android phablet

- Also known as: Sony Xperia 5 Mark III
- Brand: Sony
- Developer: Sony Mobile
- Manufacturer: Sony
- Type: Phablet
- Series: Sony Xperia
- Family: Sony Xperia 5 Series
- First released: 1 October 2021; 5 years ago
- Availability by region: 1 October 2021; 5 years ago (UK); 8 October 2021; 5 years ago (Worldwide); 12 November 2021; 4 years ago (Japan; SO-53B, SOG05 and A103SO models); 22 April 2022; 4 years ago (Japan; XQ-BQ42 SIM-unlocked model)
- Predecessor: Sony Xperia 5 II
- Successor: Sony Xperia 5 IV
- Related: Sony Xperia 1 III
- Compatible networks: 2G; 3G; 4G LTE; 5G; WiMAX 2+ (SOG05 model only)
- Form factor: Slate
- Colors: Black; Green; Pink
- Dimensions: 157 mm (6.2 in) H 68 mm (2.7 in) W 8.2 mm (0.32 in) D
- Weight: 168 g (5.9 oz)
- Operating system: Android 11 (upgradable up to Android 13)
- System-on-chip: Qualcomm Snapdragon 888
- CPU: Octa-core (1x 2.84 GHz Gold Prime, 3x 2.42 GHz Gold, 4x 1.8 GHz Silver) Kryo 680
- GPU: Adreno 660
- Modem: Qualcomm Snapdragon X60 5G
- Memory: 8 GB LPDDR5 RAM
- Storage: Universal Flash Storage (UFS 3.X); 128 GB (SO-53B, SOG05 and A103SO models); 256 GB (XQ-BQ42 model)
- Removable storage: microSDXC, expandable up to 1 TB
- Battery: Non-removable Li-ion 4500 mAh; USB PD 3.1 30W Charging
- Rear camera: 12.2 MP (Sony Exmor RS IMX557), f/1.7, 24mm (wide), 1/1.7", 1.8 μm, predictive Dual Pixel PDAF, 5-axis OIS; 12.2 MP (Sony Exmor RS IMX663), f/2.3-2.8, 70-105mm (telephoto), 1/2.9", predictive Dual Pixel PDAF, 3x/4.4x optical zoom, 5-axis OIS; 12.2 MP (Sony Exmor RS IMX363), f/2.2, 16mm (ultra-wide), 1/2.6", predictive Dual Pixel PDAF Zeiss optics, HDR, eye tracking 4K@24/25/30/60/120fps, 1080p@30/60/120/240fps
- Front camera: 8 MP (Samsung ISOCELL S5K4H7), f/2.0, 24mm (wide), 1/4", 1.0 μm, HDR, 1080p@30fps (5-axis gyro-EIS)
- Display: 6.1 in (150 mm) 1080p 21:9 (2520 × 1080) HDR OLED CinemaWide™ display, 120 Hz refresh rate, ~449 pixel density Gorilla Glass 6 HDR BT.2020; 10-bit color depth (1B colors)
- Sound: Front Stereo speakers, 3.5 mm audio jack 360 Reality Audio hardware decoding LDAC
- Media: Music
- Connectivity: Wi-Fi 802.11 a/b/g/n/ac/ax (2.4/5GHz); Bluetooth 5.2; USB-C (supports DisplayPort); NFC; GPS with Assisted GPS; Galileo; GLONASS; BeiDou; Mobile FeliCa/Osaifu-Keitai (XQ-BQ42, SO-53B, SOG05 and A103SO models only)
- Data inputs: Sensors: Accelerometer; Barometer; Fingerprint scanner (side-mounted, always on); Gyroscope; Proximity sensor; Colour spectrum sensor
- Water resistance: IP65/68
- Model: XQ-BQ42; XQ-BQ52; XQ-BQ62; XQ-BQ72; SO-53B (NTT Docomo); SOG05 (au/Okinawa Cellular); A103SO (SoftBank)
- Codename: PDX-214
- Development status: Released, Discontinued
- Made in: Thailand
- Website: Official website

The Sony Xperia 5 III (Note: The model's Roman numeral suffix is read "Mark III" (mark three).) is an Android smartphone manufactured by Sony. Part of Sony's Xperia series, the phone was announced on April 14, 2021, along with the larger Xperia 1 III and the mid-range Xperia 10 III.

== Design ==
The Xperia 5 III retains Sony's signature square design that is seen on previous Xperia phones. It is built similarly to the Xperia 1 III, using anodized aluminum for the frame and Corning Gorilla Glass 6 for the screen and back panel, as well as IP65 and IP68 certifications for water resistance. The build has a pair of symmetrical bezels on the top and the bottom, where the front-facing dual stereo speakers are placed. The left side of the phone contains a slot for a SIM card and a microSDXC card, while the right side contains a fingerprint reader embedded into the power button, a volume rocker and a shutter button. A dedicated Google Assistant button is located between the power and shutter buttons. The earpiece, front-facing camera, notification LED and various sensors are housed in the top bezel. The bottom edge has the primary microphone and USB-C port; the rear cameras are arranged in a vertical strip. The phone ships in three colors: Black, Green and Pink.

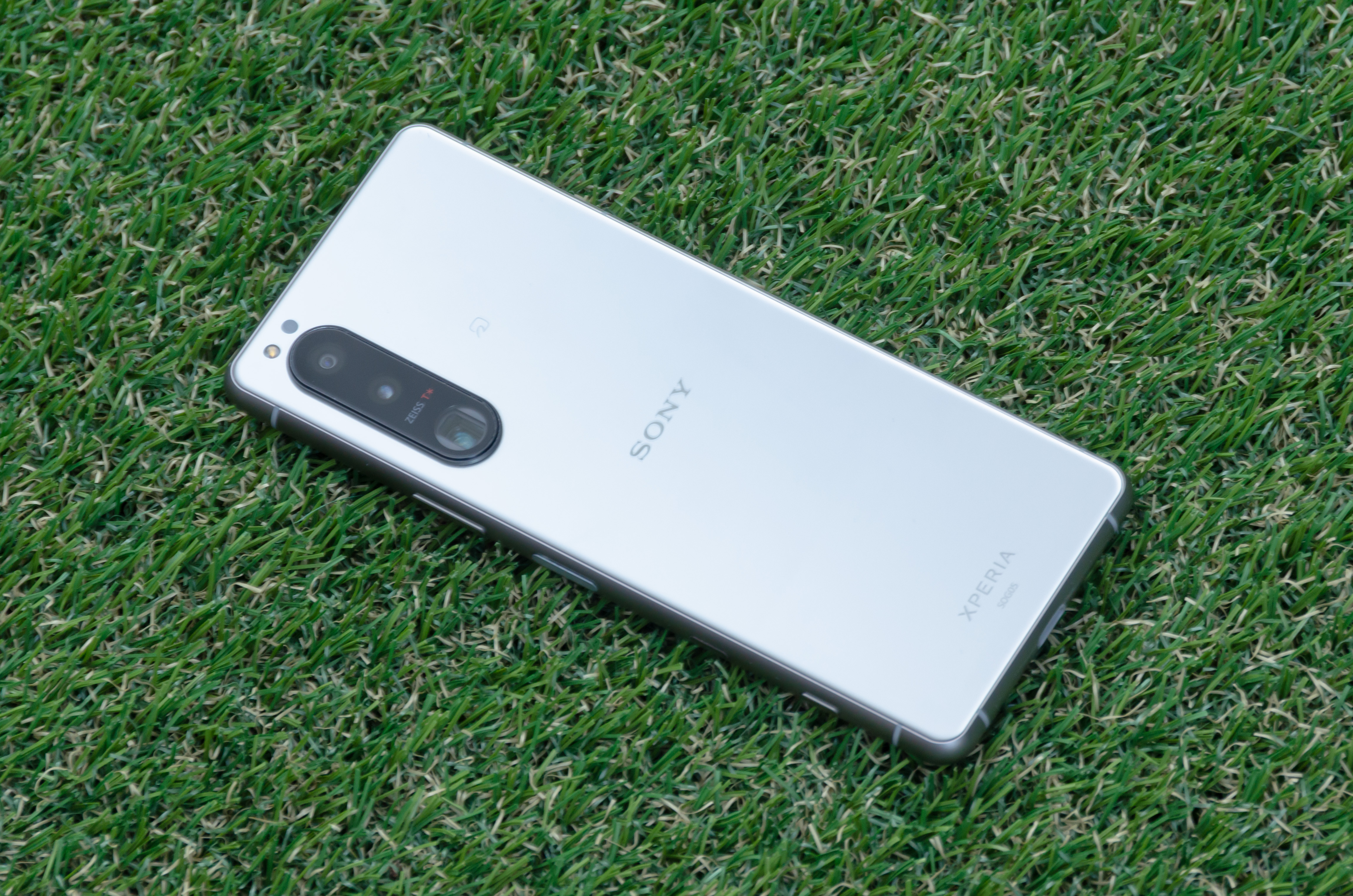
Japanese domestic silver edition, backside

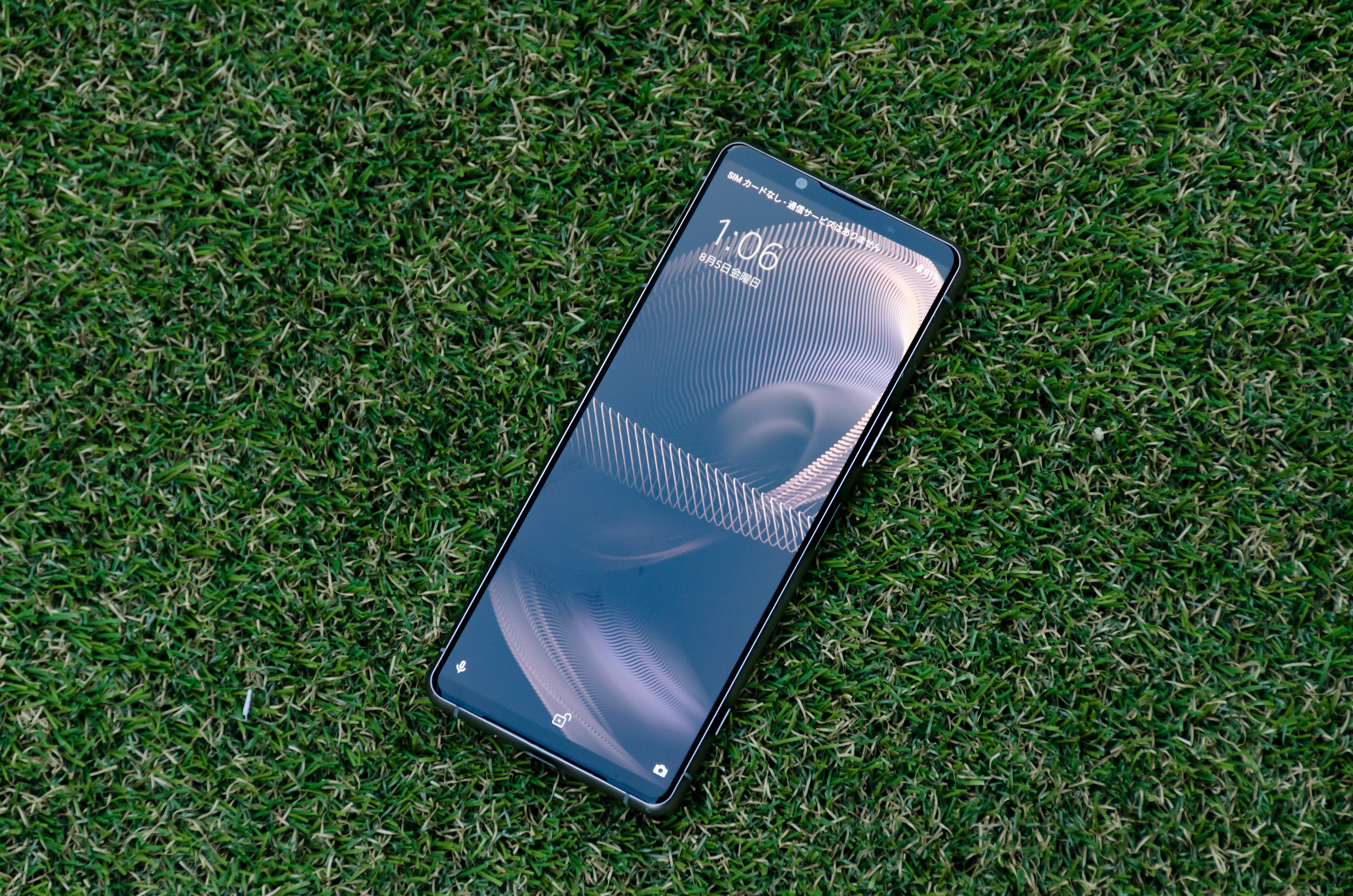
frontside

== Specifications ==
=== Hardware ===
The Xperia 5 III is powered by the Qualcomm Snapdragon 888 SoC and an Adreno 660 GPU, accompanied by 8 GB of LPDDR5 RAM. It has 128 or 256 GB of UFS internal storage, which can be expanded up to 1 TB via the microSD card slot with a hybrid dual-SIM setup. The display is a 6.1-inch 1080p (2520 × 1080) HDR OLED with a 21:9 aspect ratio, resulting in a pixel density of 449 ppi. It features a 120 Hz refresh rate, and is capable of displaying one billion colors. The battery capacity is 4500 mAh; USB Power Delivery 3.0 is supported at 30 W over USB-C, although it lacks wireless charging capabilities. The device includes a 3.5 mm audio jack as well as an active external amplifier.

==== Camera ====
The Xperia 5 III has three 12 MP rear-facing cameras and an 8 MP front-facing camera. The rear cameras consist of a wide-angle lens (24 mm f/1.7), an ultra wide angle lens (16 mm f/2.2), and a variable telephoto lens that can switch between 70 mm and 105 mm with 3× or 4.4× optical zoom; each uses ZEISS' T✻ (T-Star) anti-reflective coating. Software improvements include real-time Eye AF and Optical SteadyShot.

=== Software ===
The Xperia 5 III runs on Android 11. Sony has also paired the phone's camera tech with a "Pro" mode developed by Sony's camera division CineAlta, whose features take after Sony's Alpha camera lineup.
