= Sony Pictures Core =

Video on demand service provided by Sony

- Developer: Sony Corporation
- Release: April 2021; 5 years ago
- Operating system: Google TV, Android
- Platform: PlayStation; Xperia; Bravia
- Website: www.sonypicturescore.com

Sony Pictures Core (stylized in all caps, formerly known as Bravia Core) is a video on demand service made by Sony for its televisions and smartphones, launched in April 2021 and available for devices including PlayStation, Xperia, and Bravia. The service offers the streaming of films at up to 4K resolution provided by Sony Pictures Entertainment. CORE stands for Centre of Real Entertainment.

== History ==
Bravia Core initially came built into Bravia XR television sets made in 2021 and has since also been expanded to Sony's Mini LED, OLED, and QD-OLED ranges. In 2022, Bravia Core was released for the Sony Xperia 1 III and 1 IV smartphones and has since also been preloaded on the Xperia 5 IV line.

In October 2023, Bravia Core was renamed Sony Pictures Core, and was officially launched on PlayStation 5 and PlayStation 4 consoles. New features included early access to select films from Sony's studios, with Gran Turismo (2023) being the first early access film in select markets. Other content on Sony Pictures Core includes television shows by Sony Pictures Television and select anime provided by Crunchyroll.

In December 2025, the service was made available as a Prime Video Channel in the US and Canada, offering a curated collection of films and television shows from the Sony Pictures catalog. The service was subsequently launched as a Prime Video Channel in Japan in April 2026, and in the UK in the following month.

== Compatibility ==
Sony claims that the service has one of the largest libraries of IMAX Enhanced format film content. Streaming, which is marketed as Pure Stream, is claimed to be available at speeds of up to 80 Mbit/s.

Depending on the TV model, the number of redeem codes and the unlimited streaming period may vary.

- A80J, X95J, X90J have 5 redeem codes.
- Z9J, A90J have 10 redeem codes.
- A80J, X95J, X90 have 12 months
- Z9J, A90J have 24 months.
- Xperia 1 IV, Xperia 1 V, Xperia 5 IV, and Xperia 5 V have 12 months, and 5 redeem codes.
- PlayStation 4 and PlayStation 5 have no redeem codes.

The streaming period cannot be renewed. When the users buy a film using the codes, they can watch said film for an unlimited amount of time. More films can be bought or rented on the application.

- PlayStation users do not get free redeem codes or an unlimited streaming period, and using the software on PlayStation does not require a PlayStation Subscription. Active PlayStation Plus Premium/Deluxe members have access to exclusive benefits.
- Some Redeem Codes expire after a set amount of time, and films bought with Redeem Codes can expire, depending on the device.
