= Notification LED =

Light on a smartphone to indicate new notifications

A notification LED on a smartphone

A Notification LED is a small RGB or monochrome LED light usually present on the front-facing screen bezel (display side) of smartphones and feature phones whose purpose is to blink or pulse to notify the phone user of missed calls, incoming SMS messages, notifications from other apps, low battery warning, etc., and optionally to facilitate locating the mobile phone in darkness. It usually pulses in a continuous way to draw the attention of the user. It is a part of the device's notification system that uses a cloud-powered push notification service to relay remote notification messages to the user, or local notifications. Similar to audio notifications, a notification LED is a very battery-efficient way to inform the user of new notifications without turning on the screen at all.

== Overview ==
In any mobile phone or smartphone, battery life is an important consideration and the display is the component that consumes the maximum battery when it is fully lit up. In regular usage, a user may only want to briefly turn on their phone to check if anything requires attention.

By blinking unobtrusively, the notification LED light discreetly conveys to the user of any potentially important message or call. This way, the whole display does not have to be turned on every time a message arrives, thus saving the battery. When the user is away from the phone or when the phone is in silent mode, the blinking LED can effectively convey the user that some action is needed. Conversely, if the light does not blink, then it conveys to the user that there is no unread message or notification that requires their attention, again saving battery and the user's time and effort required to unlock the device, and check for new messages.

In some phones, the LED notification light is also sometimes designed to glow red when the battery is low, when the battery is charging and turn green when the battery is fully charged. This saves the user the hassle of turning on the screen to check the battery percentage.

While most phones used to include the notification LED light on the front side, some smartphone manufacturers like LG or Nokia also integrated it into the power button, while some phones from Motorola, Xiaomi, Razer or ASUS had their brand logo on the back side of the phone, serving as the notification light.

== Depreciation ==
Starting 2019 most smartphones vendors have stopped adding the notification LED which could be explained by the advent of AOD and a drive for smaller bezels.

== Customization based on app ==
In some Android and BlackBerry smartphones, the notification LED light's behavior could be customized per app, so that, each color would indicate a different app. Apps like WhatsApp or Telegram also include a setting to set this color for the LED light.

== Alternative always on display feature ==
The notification LED light was popular when feature phones were widely used. In early smartphones running Windows Mobile or the Android operating system, the LED notification light was also a fairly common feature. These smartphones usually had LCD screens, so without the LED present, the entire backlight behind the display would need to be turned on to check for any new notifications.

Gradually, the smartphone industry has been moving towards OLED displays. With this transition, the dedicated notification LED light has slowly been eliminated from newer smartphones. There is also a focus by smartphone designers to minimize the screen bezels or keep them very thin, thus leaving no room for the notification LED light.

As a replacement for the LED light, some smartphones from Samsung, LG, and Nokia include an Always On Display feature. On OLED displays, the Always-On Display (AOD) shows limited information while the phone is asleep, that is, when the entire display is not lit up. With OLED screens, only a part of the screen, or a few pixels on it can be turned on to convey information.

With any pixel on an OLED screen effectively being a notification LED, software can be used to customize its appearance. It can blink or pulse like a light continuously, or some phone manufacturers light up the display's pixels like a ring or have edge lighting.

Smartphones with Notification LEDs (since 2017)
Manufacturer	Model	Year	LED Position	LED Color	Notes
Librem	5	2020	Front Top	RGB	
OnePlus	5	2017	Front Top	RGB	
OnePlus	5t	2017	Front Top	RGB	
OnePlus	6	2018	Front Top	RGB	Last OnePlus model with Notification LED
Samsung	Galaxy J8	2018	?	?	
Sony	Xperia 1	2019	Front Top	RGB	
Sony	Xperia 1 II	2020	Front Top	RGB	
Sony	Xperia 1 III	2021	Front Top	RGB	
Sony	Xperia 1 IV	2022	Front Top	RGB	Last Xperia 1 series with Notification LED
Sony	Xperia 5	2019	Front Top	RGB	
Sony	Xperia 5 II	2020	Front Top	RGB	
Sony	Xperia 5 III	2021	Front Top	RGB	
Sony	Xperia 5 IV	2022	Front Top	RGB	Last Sony Xperia 5 series with Notification LED
Sony	Xperia 10	2019	Front Top	RGB	
Sony	Xperia 10 II	2020	Front Top	RGB	
Sony	Xperia 10 III	2021	Front Top	RGB	
Sony	Xperia 10 IV	2022	Front Top	RGB	Last Sony Xperia 10 series with Notification LED
Sony	Xperia L3	2019	Front Top	RGB	
Sony	Xperia XZ Premium	2017	Front Top	RGB	
Sony	Xperia XZ1	2017	Front Top	RGB	
Sony	Xperia XZ2 series	2018	Front Top	RGB	
Sony	Xperia XZs	2017	Front Top	RGB	
Sony	Xperia 8	2019	Front Top	RGB	
Sony	Xperia L4	2020	Front Top	RGB	
Xiaomi	Redmi Note 9	2020	Front Top	?	Also on various related models
Xiaomi	Redmi Note 7	2019	?	?	
Samsung	Galaxy S8 series	2017	Front Top	RGB	
Samsung	Galaxy S9 series	2018	Front Top	RGB	Last Samsung flagship smartphone with Notification LED
Samsung	Galaxy Note 8	2017	Front Top	RGB	
Samsung	Galaxy Note 9	2018	Front Top	RGB	Last Samsung phablet with Notification LED
BlackBerry	Key1	2017	Front Top	RGB	
BlackBerry	Key2	2018	Front Top	RGB	
BlackBerry	Motion	2017	Front Top	RGB	
Oppo	Reno 7 Pro	2021	Rear Top	Blue	
Motorola	Moto G7 series	2019	Front Top	RGB	May need 3rd party S/W to enable. May be sub-model distinctions.
Motorola	Moto Z3	2018	Front Top	?	May need 3rd party S/W to enable.
Motorola	Moto G5 series	2017	Front Top	?	May need 3rd party S/W to enable. May be sub-model distinctions.
Nokia	3.2	2019	Side button	White	Overlaid with power button, white color only.
Nokia	4.2	2019	Side button	White	Overlaid with power button, white color only.
Xiaomi	Redmi K50	2022	Rear	?	Includes variants eg Poco F4 GT etc. Some are in camera module.
ASUS	Zenfone 8	2021	Bottom Edge	Simple color	Reputedly only supports red, green and yellow
Xiaomi	Mi 10T Pro	2020	Front, Top Left	White	
Huawei	Y6 (2018)	2018	Front, Top Left	RGB	The phone uses Red, White, and Green (follows battery level) for generic notifications. Otherwise, the phone follows the LED color that the app uses.
Xiaomi	Pocophone F1	2018	Front, Bottom	White	
