= Asie =

Asie is the French word for Asia, a continent. It could also refer to:

- Asie Payton (1937–1997), American musician
- Asieh Ahmadi, Iranian musician
- Asie, a Danish pickled cucumber

== See also ==
- Ase (disambiguation)
- ASI (disambiguation)
- Brice Assie, Côte-d'Ivorean and French basketball player
- Hasie, South African rugby player
