= ASE =

ASE may refer to:

== Organisations ==
- Academia de Studii Economice (the Economic Sciences Academy), in Bucharest, Romania
- Admiralty Signal Establishment, a former defense research organization in the UK
- ASE Group (Advanced Semiconductor Engineering),
- African School of Economics, a private university located in Benin
- Agence spatiale européenne, the French name for European Space Agency
- Alliance to Save Energy, a non-profit coalition in Washington, D.C., US
- Amalgamated Society of Engineers
- American Society of Echocardiography
- Amity School of Engineering, a private engineering college located in Noida, India
- The Association for Science Education, a professional association in the United Kingdom for teachers of science
- Association for Social Economics, an international association dedicated to social economics
- Association of Space Explorers, a non-governmental space organization of international astronauts
- Atomstroyexport, the Russian nuclear power equipment and service export monopoly
- Auslands- und Spezialeinsätze, a specialised police unit within the Federal Criminal Police Office (Germany)
- Australian Screen Editors, an Australian film editing guild headquartered in Sydney
- Automotive Service Excellence, a U.S.-based group to improve the quality of automobile servicing

=== Stock exchanges ===
- Ahmedabad Stock Exchange, the second oldest exchange in India
- Alberta Stock Exchange, a defunct stock exchange in Calgary
- American Stock Exchange, now known as NYSE American
- Amman Stock Exchange, the Jordanian stock exchange
  - ASE Market Capitalization Weighted Index, a stock index of the Amman Stock Exchange in Jordan
- Athens Stock Exchange, the Greek stock exchange
- Australian Securities Exchange

== Science and technology ==
- Accelerated solvent extraction, a method for extracting chemicals from a matrix
- Amplified spontaneous emission or superluminescence
- Advanced silicon etching, a deep reactive ion etching

=== Computing ===
- Adaptive Server Enterprise, a database product from Sybase
- Android Scripting Environment, now known as Scripting Layer for Android
- Application-specific extensions, supplemental optional architectural extensions in the MIPS architecture
- Applied Systems Engineering
- ASCII Scene Export, a file format originated in 3D Studio
- The All-Seeing Eye, an application to help Internet gamers find game servers

== Publication ==
- Anatomical Sciences Education, an academic journal
- Anglo-Saxon England (journal), an academic journal
- Armed Services Editions (ACEs), a paperback book format used during World War II

== Other uses ==
- Aspen–Pitkin County Airport (IATA airport code)
- American Silver Eagle, an American bullion coin for precious-metal investors
- International Conference on Automated Software Engineering, an academic conference
- American Sign Language ISO code

== See also ==
- Ase (disambiguation)
