= Carousel (advertisement) =

2009 online advertisement

- A frame from Carousel in 21:9 aspect ratio
- Agency: Tribal DDB, Amsterdam
- Client: Philips
- Language: English
- Running time: 139 seconds (2:19)
- Product: Philips Cinema 21:9 TV
- Release date(s): April 2009 (online)
- Directed by: Adam Berg
- Music by: "Carousel" – Michael Fakesch
- Production company: Stinkdigital, London
- Produced by: John Reardon; Jeroen Jedeloo; Iwona Echt
- Followed by: Parallel Lines
- Official website: http://www.philips.co.uk/cinema

Carousel is an online advertisement launched in April 2009 by Philips to promote Philips Cinema 21:9 LCD televisions. The 139-second (2m19s) piece is a continuous tracking shot of a frozen moment after an armoured car heist gone wrong, with robbers dressed in clown masks holding a pitched battle with police officers inside a hospital. The campaign surrounding Carousel was led by the central Philips team at DDB in London and produced by advertising agency Tribal DDB in Amsterdam. It was directed by Adam Berg, with production contracted to London-based production company Stinkdigital. The ad went on to become a huge critical success, winning the advertising industry's most prestigious award: the Grand Prix at the Cannes Lions International Advertising Festival. It is only the second online advertisement to win in the Film category, after Dove's Evolution in 2007. Scenes from Carousel were used in the music video for hip hop artist 50 Cent's single "Ok, You're Right".

== Sequence ==
After a credit sequence, Carousel opens on a police officer kneeling on a parked police car. The camera pans across and travels past an armoured car in mid-explosion. It continues to the entrance of a hospital, where two officers are engaged in a firefight with a criminal in a clown mask, while a further two are dragging a clown out of a station wagon. The camera passes into the hospital to a reception desk, where a clown is kicking an officer through a glass window while others come up behind him. The camera rotates upwards to reveal another clown/officer pair in midair after falling from a balcony above. The camera travels up to the second floor, through an explosion into a corridor filled with clowns and officers, with several civilians cowering against the floor. Passing a ward where more figures are shooting at each other, the camera reaches a clown carrying a sack of cash who has just been shot in the back, before panning right to reveal a team of officers surrounding a man stripped to his underwear. The camera exits the window and returns to ground level, to the pointing officer on the car (revealed to be number 219) at the start. It scrolls past the officer, who hides a clown mask and a sack of cash, revealing that he is in fact one of the criminals. The piece then begins a fresh loop from the beginning.

== Production ==
=== Background and filming ===
In January 2009, Philips announced its new Philips Cinema 21:9 line of LCD televisions, promoting them as being the first production television whose proportions matched that of a cinema screen. To inform consumers about the product's features, Philips collaborated with their central agency team at DDB in London and advertising agency Tribal DDB in Amsterdam with a request to create an advertising campaign based around an educational website The team assigned to the campaign knew that many, many variations on "real cinema experience" advertisements had been tried in the past, and quickly came up with the idea of a piece composed of a single tracking shot. The team proposed the idea to several production companies, eventually settling on London-based production house Stinkdigital. After consultation with Stinkdigital about the possibility of having the tracking shot move through a frozen moment in time, the team brought on director Adam Berg, who had produced a similar advertisement for JC Jeans in 2006.

Working together with Stinkdigital executive producer Mark Pytlik, Berg began brainstorming ideas for the piece in February, including car chases and bank robberies. Eventually, they settled on the concept of a robbery gone wrong, with the clown-masked robbers escaping through a crowded hospital. The brief created, the team began scouting for locations to shoot the ad. Several hospitals in Prague were looked at, but with a recent outbreak of influenza in the Czech capital, most were unavailable. To speed up the location scouting, director of photography Fredrik Backar and post supervisor Richard Lyons accompanied the recce teams. Eventually, the team discovered an old Communist university which had been converted into a sports college, and gained permission to dress the location as a hospital.

An animatic was assembled exactly matching the proportions of the chosen location, though the action itself was made up by Berg as he went along. Tribal DDB had a schedule of seven weeks from the pitching to the end of post-production, and assigned two days for shooting the film itself. A crew of more than a hundred people was assembled for Carousel. The 60-strong cast of extras mostly comprised Czech dancers and stuntmen, who had the muscle control necessary to stay sufficiently still for the extended filming sessions.

The path taken through the location was 100 m long, and was broken into seven shots. These were taken on Kodak Vision3 500T 35 mm film stock in an Arriflex 435 camera. Three cranes (a Fisher, a SuperTechnoCrane 50, and a Scorpio) and a motion-controlled rig were needed to produce the range of movement the camera takes through the scenery. Two versions of each of the shots were taken, one at 50 fps (instead of the usual 25 fps) to minimise any motion from the extras, and a second "clean" shot with all extras and suspended vehicles removed, to aid in post-production editing.

=== Post-production and website ===
Even with 90 percent of the final footage and stunts captured in-camera, the post-production work required for Carousel was extensive. An initial telecine transfer was performed by colourist Jean-Clement Soret at The Moving Picture Company in London. The palette for each room was slightly altered to give the illusion of separate spaces, and the colour grading was deliberately made "flat" to make video effects work easier. The footage was then passed to Stockholm-based visual effects company Redrum, where editing and 3D effects work was overseen by Richard Lyons, who had worked with director Adam Berg on his earlier JC Jeans advertisement. The first thing done was to stitch together the seven shots using video editing software Flame and Xpress Pro. 3-D elements such as flying debris, bullets, explosions and muzzle flashes were created by Magoo Studios using 3ds max. Other video effects work included wire removal and set extension. When the work was completed, another telecine transfer was performed to push the contrast and blend the added effects with the live-action footage.

Carousel had been intended from the start to be primarily web-based, as it was felt that the length and level of violence in the piece were too great for screenings on television to be an option. A microsite was developed for the piece by Stinkdigital for Tribal DDB. Because of the time it would take to buffer a Flash Video of Carousel's length, a number of tricks were used to disguise the video's loading time. Buffering begins while users select their internet connection type on a page designed to look like an MPAA certification, and continues through a cinematic title sequence. The length of the title sequence varies depending on the connection speed selected.

At certain points during Carousel, viewers can elect to switch to watching one of three short films blended into the tracking shot. When one of the films is selected, the effects which were added in post-production disappear, and the rigging used in production reappears. An actor portraying a member of the cast comes on to discuss an element of the filming or a feature of the product. In the first, the director of photography discusses the lighting techniques used in Carousel. In the second, the director discusses the cinematic 21:9 aspect ratio and interacts with one of the extras. In the third, the VFX supervisor expands on the post-production process, and through a fake video-editing interface alters various aspects of the scene. The scripts for these short commentaries were written by Tribal DDB, with input from Stinkdigital and Redrum.

The soundtrack to Carousel was composed by Michael Fakesch. The music was altered for the Philips microsite by Stinkdigital so that, if users chose to move through the film at a different rate or in a different direction, the music would distort to match. Other features of the microsite included an Ambilight feature and the ability to switch at will between 21:9 and 16:9 aspect ratios.

== Release and reception ==
The release of Carousel was a huge success. In just over two weeks, it had been viewed over half a million times, with visitors to the minisite spending an average of 5m20s watching the film. Of these, 50 percent used one or more of the interactive features of the site. A number of celebrities commented on the quality of the ad; actor Ashton Kutcher pointed followers of his Twitter account to it, and hip hop artist Kanye West referred to it as "hands down the best video of the year".

In June 2009, Philips collaborated with hip hop artist 50 Cent on the music video for his single "Ok You're Right". The video begins by zooming into a Philips 21:9 LCD television, and contains footage from Carousel, as well as scenes of 50 Cent dressed as one of the robbers. The video was directed by Chris Romero, and featured 150 listeners of radio station Hot 97 as extras.

Carousel received much critical acclaim from within the advertising industry. Editors of the trade journal Boards said of the piece: "Technically, the stillness contrasted with the implied sound and fury is eerily fascinating, while the muffled sound design gives subtle, grim contextual cues. Masterful stuff." Early indications at the Cannes Lions International Advertising Festival, the industry's most prestigious awards ceremony, were that, with few stand-out televised candidates, the winner of the Film Grand Prix was likely to be an internet or viral film. As such, Carousel was pipped as a contender in both the Film and Cyber categories. Other potential winners in the Film category included Fate for Nike-brand sportswear, House of Cards for the homelessness charitable organisation Shelter, and Secrets and Lies for Levi's-brand jeans. In the Cyber category, Carousel's prime competition was believed to be the Whopper Sacrifice campaign for Burger King. The 22 members of the awarding jury unanimously voted Carousel the winner for the Grand Prix in the Film category, and the winner of a Silver award in the Cyber category.

A member of the awarding jury later said of the piece: "Philips' Carousel is a prime example of forward thinking. Not only is it a remarkable, highly watchable film in its own right, but viewers could scroll across the piece online to discover films hidden within the film. One winds up spending ten or 11 minutes with the brand voluntarily – what is that worth to a client?" As only the second online advertisement to receive the Film Grand Prix (after Dove's Evolution in 2007), Carousel's win, and the potential effect on the future of the category, was widely remarked upon within the advertising industry. Rae Ann Fera of Boards commented: "The Grand Prix winner was thrilling for [several] reasons. First, that an online-only film with well-integrated interactivity won the top Film award further signals the future direction of the industry." Campaign declared that "It took the prize at Cannes not because it was made for online, but because it succeeds where many ordinary ads fail – it draws viewers in voluntarily"

=== References in other media ===
Media outlets made comparisons between Carousel and the opening scenes of the 2008 film The Dark Knight, in which criminals wearing clown masks rob a bank under instructions from the Joker.

The first episode of the 10th season of CSI starts with a cold open that uses a similar time-frozen tracking shot. The Other Guys features a similar scene, except it shows the antics of the protagonists at a bar.

The launch trailer for the 2013 video game Payday 2 is strongly based on Carousel, depicting a similar still scene of robbers wearing clown masks battling police.

The opening credits scene of the 2016 film Deadpool is based on this ad. Director Adam Berg had, at one stage, been in the running to direct the movie.

Preceded by Gorilla; Believe	Cannes Lions Film Grand Prix Winner; 2009	Succeeded by The Man Your Man Could Smell Like
