= HARMST =

HARMST is an acronym for high aspect ratio microstructure technology, which describes fabrication technologies, used to create high-aspect-ratio microstructures with heights between tens of micrometers up to a centimeter, and aspect ratios greater than 10:1. Examples include the LIGA fabrication process, advanced silicon etch, and deep reactive ion etching.

== See also ==
- LIGA
- Micromechanical systems — high aspect ratio (HAR) micromachining
