= Stinkdigital =

Stink Studios
- Industry: Technology, design, interactive, advertising
- Founded: 2009
- Headquarters: London, United Kingdom
- Area served: Global
- Key people: Mark Pytlik, CEO; James Britton, Global Managing Director
- Number of employees: 140
- Divisions: New York City, Los Angeles, London, Paris, Berlin, Shanghai, São Paulo
- Website: www.stinkstudios.com

Stink Studios (formerly Stinkdigital) is a global creative studio with offices in London, New York, Los Angeles, Paris, Shanghai, Berlin and São Paulo. The company is part of the Stink Group, an independently-owned global creative network. Stink Studios creates digital and integrated advertising working across film, design, technology and strategy. Its clients include Google, Spotify, Twitter, Ray-Ban and Nike.

== History ==
Stink Studios was founded in January 2009 as an interactive production company by Mark Pytlik, and Daniel Bergmann, Founder and President of global commercial and music video production company Stink. The company opened with a small office of five people. Its first project, done with Tribal DDB Amsterdam, was Carousel (advertisement), an interactive long form internet film for Philips to promote Philips Cinema 21:9 TV. Carousel went on to win the Film Grand Prix at Cannes Lions International Festival of Creativity that year.

In April 2010, the company opened their second office in New York City, USA.

In December 2012, the company opened their third office in Paris, France.

In June 2014, the company opened their fourth office in Berlin, Germany.

In January 2015, the company opened their fifth office in Los Angeles, USA.

In January 2017, Stinkdigital was rebranded to Stink Studios.

== Notable work ==
=== 2009 ===
- 'Carousel (advertisement)', Philips Cinema 21:9 TV

=== 2011 ===
- 'Obsessed With Sound' for Philips

=== 2012 ===
- 'Tweetfuel'
- 'The Sound of Creation' for Philips

=== 2014 ===
- 'The Other Side', a dual-narrative interactive film created for the launch of Honda's Civic Type R car, created with Wieden+Kennedy.
- 'Monty's Goggles', an immersive 360° experience using Google Cardboard as part of John Lewis' 2014 Christmas campaign 'Monty The Penguin' with adam&eveDDB.

=== 2015 ===
- 'Inside Abbey Road', an online interactive experience that enables the public to access Abbey Road Studios created with Google and Abbey Road.

=== 2017 ===
- 'A Message From Earth', an interactive site of specially-commissioned music, film, art, and literature paying tribute to The Voyager Golden Record project to celebrate its 40th anniversary in partnership with WeTransfer.

=== 2018 ===
- 'The Most Exclusive Collection', an interactive campaign for Yoox

== Clients ==
- Ray-Ban
- Strava
- Airbnb
- TikTok
- WeWork
- Alibaba
- Google
- Spotify
- Netflix
- Adidas
- YOOX
- Channel 4
- WeTransfer
