= Sony Xperia 8 =

Android smartphone

- Brand: Sony
- Manufacturer: Sony Mobile Communications
- Type: Smartphone
- Series: Sony Xperia
- First released: 7 October 2019; 6 years ago
- Availability by region: Xperia 8: 25 October 2019; 6 years ago (Japan; au/Okinawa Cellular, UQ Mobile and Y!Mobile); Xperia 8 Lite: 1 September 2020; 5 years ago (Japan)
- Successor: Sony Xperia 10 II
- Related: Sony Xperia 10
- Compatible networks: 2G; 3G; 4G LTE; WiMAX 2+ (au/Okinawa Cellular and UQ Mobile models only)
- Form factor: Slate
- Dimensions: 158 mm (6.2 in) H 69 mm (2.7 in) W 8.1 mm (0.32 in) D
- Weight: 170 g (6.0 oz)
- Operating system: Original: Android 9 "Pie"; Current: Android 10
- System-on-chip: Qualcomm Snapdragon 630
- CPU: Octa-core (2.2 GHz Cortex-A53)
- GPU: Adreno 508
- Memory: 4 GB LPDDR4X RAM
- Storage: eMMC 5.1; 64 GB
- Removable storage: microSD, expandable up to 512 GB
- Battery: Non-removable; Xperia 8: 2760 mAh; Xperia 8 Lite: 2870 mAh
- Rear camera: 12 MP, f/1.8 (wide); 8 MP, f/2.4
- Front camera: 8 MP, f/2.0, 24mm (wide), 1/4", 1.0 μm, 1080p@30fps
- Display: 6 in (150 mm) 1080p (2520 x 1080) IPS LCD, ~457 pixel density, Gorilla Glass 5
- Sound: Loudspeaker, 3.5mm headphone jack
- Connectivity: Wi-Fi 802.11 a/b/g/n/ac (2.4/5GHz); Bluetooth 5.0; USB-C; NFC; GPS with Assisted GPS; GLONASS; Mobile FeliCa/Osaifu-Keitai
- Data inputs: Sensors: Accelerometer; Barometer; Fingerprint scanner (side-mounted, always on); Gyroscope; Proximity sensor
- Model: Xperia 8: SOV42 (au/Okinawa Cellular); 902SO (Y!Mobile); Xperia 8 Lite: J3273
- Website: Official website (Xperia 8); Official website (Xperia 8 Lite)

The Sony Xperia 8 is an Android smartphone marketed and manufactured by Sony. Part of Sony's midrange Xperia series, it was unveiled on October 7, 2019 as a Japan-exclusive device.

== Design ==
The Xperia 8 resembles the Xperia 10, but has an aluminum frame and Gorilla Glass 6 on the front and back. The screen has asymmetrical bezels, with the top bezel housing the earpiece, front-facing camera, notification LED and various sensors. The power button/fingerprint sensor and volume buttons are located on the right side of the device, while the 3.5mm headphone jack is located on the top. Notably, the shutter release button has been omitted. The rear cameras are centered and located near the top of the phone, with the LED flash above. The bottom edge has the primary microphone and a downward-firing speaker next to the USB-C port. At 158 mm × 69 mm × 8.1 mm and 170g (5.99 oz), the device is marginally larger and heavier than the 10 while seeing a slight decrease in depth. An IP65/68 rating is present, and four colors are available: White, Black, Orange and Blue.

== Specifications ==
=== Hardware ===
The device shares its chipset with the Xperia 10, a Qualcomm Snapdragon 630 SoC and the Adreno 508 GPU. It is available with 4 GB of RAM and 64 GB of eMMC storage. MicroSD card expansion is supported up to 512 GB with a single-SIM or hybrid dual-SIM setup. The display is also identical to the 10's, a 6-inch (152mm) 21:9 1080p (1080 × 2520) IPS LCD panel which results in a pixel density of 457 ppi. The Xperia 8's battery is 4% smaller than the 10's, with a 2760mAh cell. Power and data connections are provided through the USB-C port. A dual camera setup is present on the rear, with a 12 MP primary lens and an 8 MP secondary lens. The front-facing camera has an 8 MP sensor.

=== Software ===
The Xperia 8 runs on Android 9 "Pie".
