= Sony Xperia PRO-I =

2021 Android smartphone

- Brand: Sony
- Manufacturer: Sony Mobile
- Type: Phablet
- Series: Sony Xperia
- Family: Sony Xperia PRO series
- First released: 10 December 2021; 4 years ago (United States); 15 December 2021; 4 years ago (Japan)
- Predecessor: Sony Xperia PRO
- Related: Sony Xperia 1 III
- Compatible networks: 2G; 3G; 4G LTE; 5G
- Form factor: Slate
- Color: Black
- Dimensions: 166 mm (6.5 in) H 72 mm (2.8 in) W 8.9 mm (0.35 in) D
- Weight: 221 g (7.8 oz)
- Operating system: Android 11
- System-on-chip: Qualcomm Snapdragon 888 5G
- CPU: Octa-core (1x 2.84 GHz Gold Prime, 3x 2.42 GHz Gold, 4x 1.8 GHz Silver) Kryo 680
- GPU: Adreno 660
- Modem: Qualcomm Snapdragon X60 5G
- Memory: 12 GB LPDDR5 RAM
- Storage: Universal Flash Storage (UFS 3.1); 512 GB
- Removable storage: microSDXC, expandable up to 1 TB
- SIM: nanoSIM + nanoSIM
- Battery: Non-removable Li-ion 4500 mAh; USB PD 3.1 30 W Charging
- Charging: Fast Charging USB PD 3.1 30 W Charging
- Rear camera: 12 MP (Sony Exmor RS IMX478), f/2.0/4.0, 24mm (wide), 1", 2.4 μm, PDAF, OIS 12 MP (Sony Exmor RS IMX663), f/2.4, 50mm (telephoto), 1/2.9", PDAF, 2x optical zoom, OIS 12 MP (Sony Exmor RS IMX363), f/2.2, 124˚, 16mm (ultrawide), 1/2.55", Dual Pixel PDAF 0.3 MP (Sony Exmor R IMX316), TOF 3D, (depth) Zeiss Tessar optics, 12-bit RAW, HDR, eye tracking 4K@24/25/30/60/120fps, 1080p@30/60/120/240fps
- Front camera: 8 MP (Samsung ISOCELL S5K4H7), f/2.0, 24mm (wide), 1/4", 1.12 μm, HDR Photo, Portrait selfie, Display flash, Hand and Smile Shutter; 1080p@30fps
- Display: 6.5 in (170 mm) 4K 21:9 (3840 x 1644) HDR OLED CinemaWide™ display, ~643 pixel density Gorilla Glass Victus; HDR10; HLG; 10-bit color depth 120 Hz refresh rate
- Sound: Front-facing stereo speakers 3.5 mm headphone jack 24-bit/192kHz audio
- Media: Game Enhancer, Video Pro, Music
- Connectivity: Wi-Fi 802.11 a/b/g/n/ac/ax (6) (2.4/5GHz); Bluetooth 5.2; USB-C 3.2 Gen 2 (supports DisplayPort); DisplayPort support NFC; GPS with Assisted GPS; Galileo; GLONASS; BeiDou
- Data inputs: Sensors: Accelerometer; Barometer; Fingerprint scanner (side-mounted, always on); Gyroscope; Proximity sensor; Colour spectrum sensor
- Water resistance: IP65/IP68 Water/dust resistant
- Model: XQ-BE62; XQ-BE72
- Codename: PDX-217
- Development status: Released, Discontinued
- Made in: Thailand
- Other: IP65/IP68 Water/dust resistant PS4 Remote Play; DUALSHOCK 4 Control compatibility PS5 Remote Play; DUALSENSE® Control compatibility Game Enhancer; Dynamic Vibration System
- Website: Official Website

The Sony Xperia PRO-I is an Android smartphone manufactured by Sony. Designed to be the new professional flagship of Sony's Xperia series, the phone was announced on October 26, 2021.

== Specifications ==
=== Hardware ===
The Xperia PRO-I has a Qualcomm Snapdragon 888 SoC and an Adreno 660 GPU, with 12 GB of RAM and 512 GB of UFS internal storage (which can be expanded up to 1 TB via the microSD card slot) as well as a dual-hybrid nano-SIM card slot. The phone features a 6.5-inch 4K OLED with an ultrawide 21:9 aspect ratio, and has 10-bit color, support for HDR BT.2020, and a 120 Hz refresh rate. It has a 4500 mAh battery, and supports 30 W fast charging over USB-C, but lacks support for wireless charging. The phone has front-facing dual stereo speakers and a 3.5 mm audio jack.

=== Camera ===
The Xperia PRO-I has three rear-facing 12 MP sensors and a 3D iToF sensor, and a front-facing 8 MP sensor. The rear cameras include the wide lens (24 mm), the ultrawide lens (16 mm f/2.2) and the telephoto lens (50 mm f/2.4); all of which use ZEISS' T✻ (T-Star) anti-reflective coating. The wide lens uses a modified version of the 20 MP 1.0-type stacked sensor found in the RX100 VII, however only 60% of the sensor is used to output 12 MP photos. The lens has a mechanical dual aperture (f/2.0 and f/4.0) allowing users to control the depth of field. The cameras are capable of recording 4K video at up to 120 FPS and 1080p video at up to 240 FPS. The phone also has 12-bit RAW output.

=== Software ===
The Xperia PRO-I runs on Android 11. It is also equipped with a “Photo Pro” mode developed by Sony's camera division α (Alpha) and a “Cinema Pro” mode developed by Sony's cinematography division CineAlta, as well as a new “Video Pro” mode.
