= Sony Xperia PRO =

2020 Android smartphone

- Brand: Sony
- Manufacturer: Sony Mobile
- Type: Phablet
- Series: Sony Xperia
- Family: Sony Xperia PRO series
- First released: 27 January 2021; 5 years ago (Japan and United States); 13 June 2021; 5 years ago (United Kingdom); 14 June 2021; 5 years ago (Germany and Nordic countries)
- Predecessor: Sony Xperia 1 Professional Edition (J9150)
- Successor: Sony Xperia PRO-I
- Related: Sony Xperia 1 II
- Compatible networks: 2G; 3G; 4G LTE; 5G
- Form factor: Slate
- Color: Black
- Dimensions: 170.2 mm (6.70 in) H 76.2 mm (3.00 in) W 10.2 mm (0.40 in) D
- Weight: 225 g (7.9 oz)
- Operating system: Android 10, upgradable to Android 12; 2 OS updates, 2 years of security patches
- System-on-chip: Qualcomm Snapdragon 865
- CPU: Octa-core (1x 2.84 GHz Gold Prime, 3x 2.42 GHz Gold, 4x 1.8 GHz Silver) Kryo 585
- GPU: Adreno 650
- Modem: Qualcomm Snapdragon X55 5G
- Memory: 12 GB LPDDR5 RAM
- Storage: Universal Flash Storage (UFS 3.0); 512 GB
- Removable storage: microSDXC, expandable up to 1 TB
- SIM: nanoSIM + nanoSIM
- Battery: Non-removable Li-ion 4000 mAh
- Charging: USB Power Delivery (USB-PD) 3.0 21 W Fast Charging
- Rear camera: 12.2 MP (Sony Exmor RS IMX557), f/1.7, 24mm (wide), 1/1.7", 1.8 μm, predictive Dual Pixel PDAF, 5-axis OIS; 12.2 MP (Samsung ISOCELL S5K3T2), f/2.4, 70mm (telephoto), 1/3.4", 1.0 μm, predictive Dual Pixel PDAF, 3x optical zoom, 5-axis OIS; 12.2 MP (Sony Exmor RS IMX363), f/2.2, 16mm (ultra-wide), 1/2.55", predictive Dual Pixel PDAF; 3D iToF sensor Zeiss optics, HDR, eye tracking 4K@24/25/30/60/120fps, 1080p@30/60/120fps
- Front camera: 8 MP (Samsung ISOCELL S5K4H7), f/2.0, 24mm (wide), 1/4", 1.0 μm, 5-axis gyro-EIS, HDR; 1080p@30fps
- Display: 6.5 in (170 mm) 4K 21:9 (3840 x 1644) HDR OLED CinemaWide™ display, ~643 ppi Gorilla Glass 6 HDR10; HLG; 10-bit color depth
- Sound: Front-facing stereo speakers 3.5 mm headphone jack 24-bit/192kHz audio
- Media: Music; Game Enhancer
- Connectivity: Wi-Fi 802.11 a/b/g/n/ac/6 (2.4/5GHz); Bluetooth 5.1; USB-C 3.1 (supports DisplayPort); Micro-HDMI; NFC; GPS with Assisted GPS; Galileo; GLONASS
- Data inputs: Sensors: Accelerometer; Barometer; Fingerprint scanner (side-mounted, always on); Gyroscope; Proximity sensor; Color spectrum sensor
- Water resistance: IP65/IP68 Water/dust resistant
- Model: XQ-AQ52 (Dual SIM) (Japan); XQ-AQ62 (Dual SIM) (United States)
- Codename: PDX-204
- Other: IP65/IP68 Water/dust resistant Dynamic Vibration System
- Website: Official Website

The Sony Xperia PRO is an Android smartphone manufactured by Sony Mobile. It is exclusive to the United States, Japan, and Europe, and is intended as a phone for video professionals, offering HDMI input and mmWave 5G connectivity.

== Specifications ==
=== Hardware ===
The Xperia PRO is powered by the Qualcomm Snapdragon 865 and the Adreno 650 GPU, and has 12 GB of RAM and 512 GB of UFS 3.0 internal storage (which can be expanded up to 1 TB via the microSDXC card slot), as well as one nano SIM slot. The display is a 6.5-inch 4K OLED with an ultrawide 21:9 aspect ratio that supports HDR BT.2020 and is capable of displaying one billion colors. The battery capacity is 4000 mAh, and offers 21 W fast charging over USB-C, but does not support wireless charging. There are front-facing stereo speakers and a 3.5 mm audio jack. The Xperia PRO has a micro-HDMI port, which enables it to be used as a camera field monitor via the External Monitor app, or stream live video directly to YouTube from an external camera. The phone also has an additional Network Visualizer app displaying upload and download speeds in real time.

=== Camera ===
The Xperia PRO's camera setup is identical to the Xperia 1 II, with three rear-facing 12 MP sensors and a 3D iToF sensor, as well as a front-facing 8 MP sensor. The rear cameras comprise the main lens (24 mm f/1.7), the ultrawide angle lens (16 mm f/2.2), and the telephoto lens (70 mm f/2.4); each uses ZEISS' T✻ (T-Star) anti-reflective coating. The phone has support for 4K video recording for up to 60 FPS and for 1080p for up to 120 FPS.

=== Software ===
The Xperia PRO runs on Android 10. Sony has also paired the phone's camera tech with a “Pro” mode developed by Sony's camera division CineAlta, whose features take after Sony's Alpha camera line-up.
