= Sony Xperia 10 II =

Android smartphone

- Also known as: Sony Xperia 10 Mark II
- Brand: Sony
- Manufacturer: Sony Mobile
- Type: Smartphone
- Series: Sony Xperia
- Family: Sony Xperia 10 Series
- First released: 5 May 2020; 6 years ago
- Availability by region: Japan: 29 May 2020; 6 years ago (A001SO) 4 June 2020; 6 years ago (SOV43) 25 June 2020; 6 years ago (SO-41A) 1 October 2020; 6 years ago (XQ-AU42; SIM-unlocked); Taiwan: 5 May 2020; 6 years ago
- Predecessor: Sony Xperia 8 Sony Xperia 10; Sony Xperia Ace
- Successor: Sony Xperia 10 III
- Related: Sony Xperia L4; Sony Xperia 1 II; Sony Xperia 5 II
- Compatible networks: 2G; 3G; 4G LTE; WiMAX 2+ (SOV43 model only)
- Form factor: Slate
- Colors: Black; White; Mint Green; Berry Blue
- Dimensions: 157 mm (6.2 in) H 69 mm (2.7 in) W 8.2 mm (0.32 in) D
- Weight: 151 g (5.3 oz)
- Operating system: Android 10, upgradable to Android 12
- System-on-chip: Qualcomm Snapdragon 665
- CPU: Octa-core (4 × 2.0 GHz Kryo 260 Gold & 4 × 1.8 GHz Kryo 260 Silver)
- GPU: Adreno 610
- Modem: Qualcomm Snapdragon X12 LTE 4G
- Memory: 4 GB LPDDR4X RAM
- Storage: eMMC; 64 GB (XQ-AU42, SO-41A, SOV43 and A001SO models); 128 GB (XQ-AU51 and XQ-AU52 models)
- Removable storage: microSD, expandable up to 1 TB
- Battery: Non-removable 3600 mAh
- Rear camera: 12 Mpx 1/2.8" f/2.0, 26 mm (wide) + 8 Mpx 1/4" f/2.4, 52 mm (telephoto) + 8 Mpx 1/4" f/2.2, 16 mm (ultrawide), PDAF, LED flash, HDR, panorama, 4K @ 30 fps, 1080p @ 60 fps
- Front camera: 8 Mpx, f/2.0, 24 mm (wide), 1/4", 1.0 μm, 1080p @ 30 fps
- Display: 6 in (150 mm) 1080p (2520 × 1080) OLED, 457 px/in, Gorilla Glass 6
- Sound: Loudspeaker, 3.5 mm headphone jack
- Media: Music
- Connectivity: Wi-Fi 802.11 a/b/g/n/ac (2.4/5 GHz); Bluetooth 5.0; USB-C; NFC; GPS with Assisted GPS; GLONASS; Mobile FeliCa/Osaifu-Keitai (XQ-AU42, SO-41A, SOV43 and A001SO models only)
- Data inputs: Sensors: Accelerometer; Barometer; Fingerprint scanner (side-mounted, always on); Proximity sensor
- Water resistance: IP65/68
- Model: XQ-AU42; XQ-AU51; XQ-AU52; SO-41A (NTT Docomo); SOV43 (au/Okinawa Cellular); A001SO (Y!Mobile)
- Development status: Released, Discontinued
- Website: Official website

The Sony Xperia 10 II (Note: The model's Roman numeral suffix is pronounced Mark II ("mark two").) is a mid-range Android smartphone manufactured by Sony Mobile. Part of Sony's Xperia series, it was unveiled alongside the Xperia 1 II on February 24, 2020.

== Design ==
The Xperia 10 II has a plastic frame and Corning Gorilla Glass 6 for the screen and back panel. The earpiece, front-facing camera, notification LED and various sensors are housed in the top bezel. The power button/fingerprint sensor and volume rocker are located on the right side of the device, while the 3.5 mm headphone jack is located on the top. The rear cameras are located at the upper left-hand corner of the phone, with the LED flash above. The bottom edge has the primary microphone and a downward-firing speaker next to the USB-C port. It is rated IP65/IP68 dust/water-proof up to 1.5 metres for 30 minutes. Black and white color options were shown at launch; Mint Green and Berry Blue finishes were later introduced in May.

== Specifications ==
=== Hardware ===
The device is powered by the Qualcomm Snapdragon 665 SoC and the Adreno 610 GPU. It is available with 4 GB of RAM and 64 GB or 128 GB of storage of eMMC 5.1. MicroSD card expansion is supported up to 1 TB with a single-SIM or hybrid dual-SIM setup. The display is the same size and resolution as the 10, using a 6-inch (150 mm) 21:9 1080p (1080 × 2520) display which results in a pixel density of 457 ppi; however, an OLED panel is used instead of the 10's IPS LCD panel. The 10 II has a 3600 mAh battery, which can be recharged at up to 18 W via the USB-C port. A triple camera setup is present on the rear, with a 12 MP primary sensor with PDAF, an 8 MP telephoto sensor, and an 8 MP ultrawide sensor. The front-facing camera has an 8 MP sensor.

=== Software ===
The Xperia 10 II runs on Android 10, where it can be updated to Android 11.

Xperia 10 II is the first Xperia 10 series to be eligible for 2 OS updates, the same as its flagship siblings, Xperia 1 II and Xperia 5 II, where it can be updated to Android 12 via OTA, and also the first Sony midrange since the Sony Xperia X and Xperia X Compact to be eligible for 2 OS updates, whereas prior to 10 II, Sony Xperia midrange was only eligible for one OS update.

A commercial SailfishOS release is available from Jolla.

== Notes ==
Preceded by Sony Xperia 10	Sony Xperia 10 II; 2020	Succeeded by Sony Xperia 10 III
