= Sara Ahmadi =

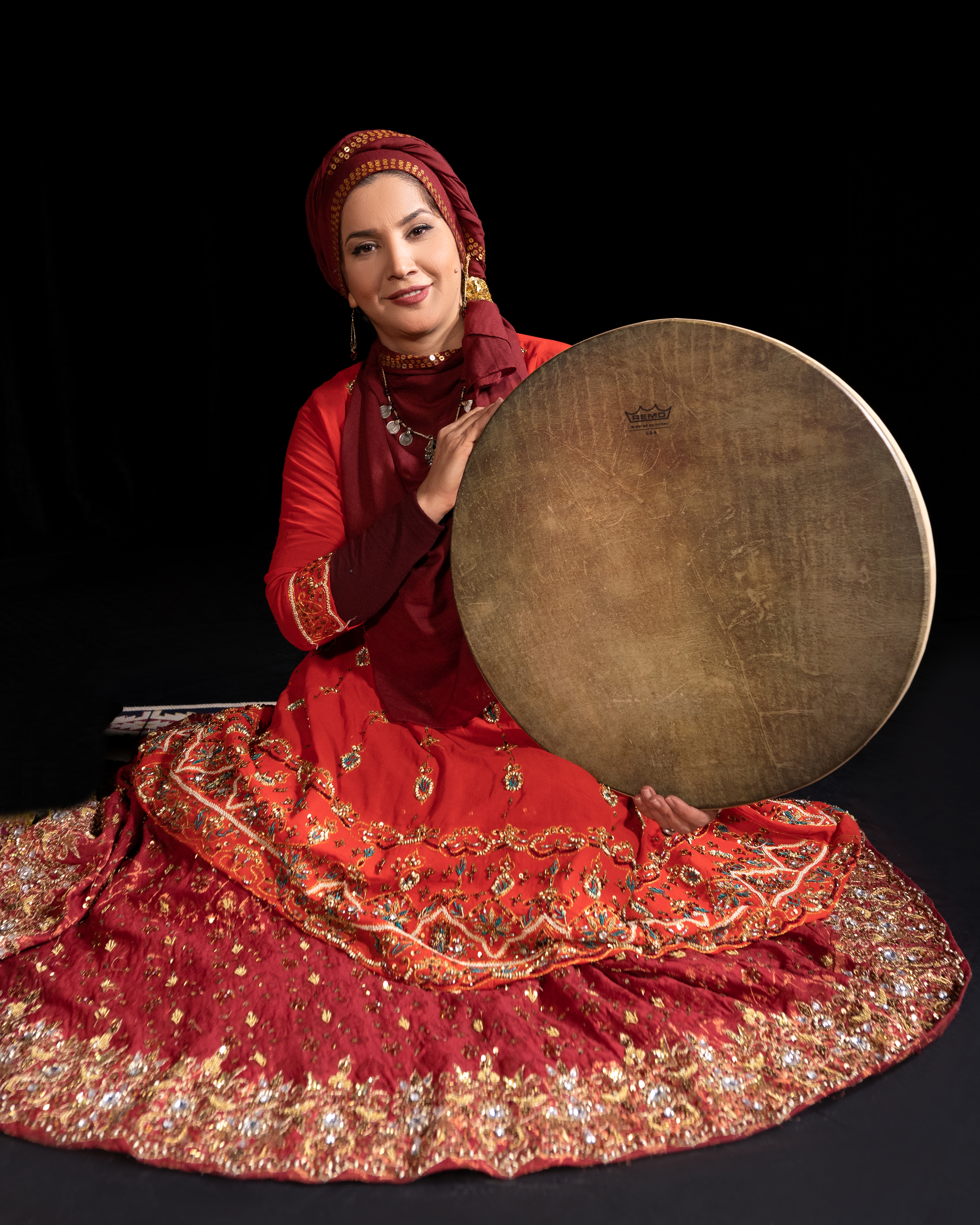

Background information
- Born: 1978 (age 46–47)
- Origin: Tehran, Iran
- Genres: Persian traditional music
- Occupation: Composer
- Instrument(s): Dayereh, Daf
- Years active: 1998–present

Sara Ahmadi (Persian: سارا احمدی) (born 19 March 1978 in Tehran) is an Iranian supervisor, percussionist and daf player of the Kaliveh Music Band (Oriental Melodies). She is the sister of Asieh Ahmadi.

== Life ==
She has started her art career since 1996 as a painter. Then she got to know the daf musical instrument and since 1998 she started her career as a musician. Participating in the 2002 and 2004 editions of the Fajr International Music Festival, she won the second prize in the Solo Section. In collaboration with different music bands including Zhiwar, Sahouri, Chehel Daf, etc., Ahmadi has had many live performances in several cities of Iran such as Rasht, Lahijan, Shiraz, Isfahan, Kerman, Kish and Tabriz. In 2005, she participated in a music festival in Iraqi Kurdistan (the Solo Section).

From 2007 through 2009, she collaborated with Rastak Music Band and had many performances in different music festivals from countries like Spain, Netherlands, Germany, Italy, and France. She has also participated in Rastak's first album (All my Ethnic Groups). Ahmadi has also been invited by the UCLA in 2009 to collaborate with music bands in blues, jazz, etc. in many states like Washington, Washington DC, Virgeniya, New York, Seattle, Kentucky, California, Arizona, Nevada and Texas (Dalas). From 2012 through 2014, she has attended two music schools in Latvia to teach music and also performed at the Tunisian Festival with her kaliveh band in 2017 and at the International Book Festival in Ton. She has participated in the 2017 Mexican Friendship Cultures Festival and the International Book Fair in China in 2018 and attended the Folk Music Festival in India in December 2019. Kaliveh has performed in Mexico for International peace of day Sep 2019. Ahmadi is the leader of Iranian Sisters group.

Ahmadi has made numerous recordings with prominent musicians including Simin Ghanem and is a member of the Rastak Group, with which she has participated in numerous concerts in Germany, France, Italy, Spain, and the Netherlands. She has also performed at the Nations Music Conference held in the United States and Japan.
