= Sony Xperia 10 =

Android smartphones

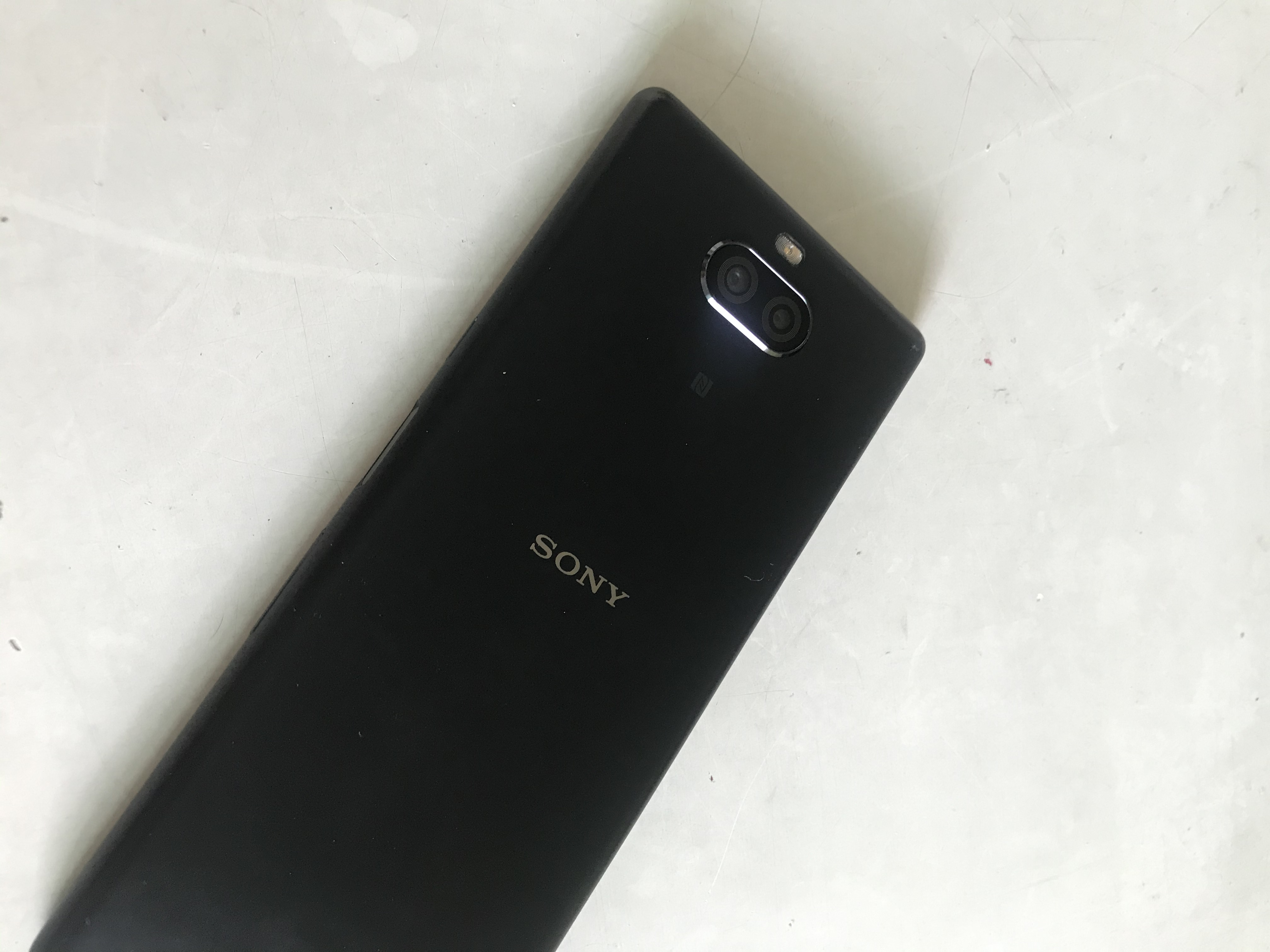
- Also known as: Sony Xperia 10 Mark I Sony Xperia 10 Plus Mark I
- Brand: Sony
- Developer: Sony Mobile
- Manufacturer: Sony Mobile Communications
- Type: Smartphone (Xperia 10); Phablet (Xperia 10 Plus)
- Series: Sony Xperia
- Family: Sony Xperia 10 Series
- First released: 27 February 2019; 7 years ago
- Predecessor: Sony Xperia XA2 For Xperia 10 Plus: Sony Xperia XA2 Plus; Sony Xperia XA2 Ultra
- Successor: Sony Xperia 10 II (Xperia 10); Sony Xperia 5 II (Xperia 10 Plus)
- Related: Sony Xperia 8
- Compatible networks: 2G; 3G; 4G LTE
- Form factor: Slate
- Colors: Shared between Xperia 10 and 10 Plus: Black, Navy, Silver Exclusive to Xperia 10: Pink Exclusive to Xperia 10 Plus: Gold
- Dimensions: 156 mm (6.1 in) H 68 mm (2.7 in) W 8.4 mm (0.33 in) D (Xperia 10); 167 mm (6.6 in) H 73 mm (2.9 in) W 8.3 mm (0.33 in) D (Xperia 10 Plus)
- Weight: 162 g (5.7 oz) (Xperia 10); 180 g (6.3 oz) (Xperia 10 Plus)
- Operating system: Original: Android 9 "Pie"; Current: Android 10
- System-on-chip: Qualcomm Snapdragon 630 (Xperia 10); Qualcomm Snapdragon 636 (Xperia 10 Plus)
- CPU: Octa-core (2.2 GHz Cortex-A53) (Xperia 10); Octa-core (1.8 GHz Kryo 260) (Xperia 10 Plus)
- GPU: Adreno 508 (Xperia 10); Adreno 509 (Xperia 10 Plus)
- Modem: Qualcomm Snapdragon X12 LTE 4G
- Memory: 3 GB or 4 GB (China) LPDDR4X RAM (Xperia 10); 4 GB or 6 GB (China) LPDDR4X RAM (Xperia 10 Plus)
- Storage: eMMC 5.1; 64 GB
- Removable storage: microSD, expandable up to 512 GB
- SIM: nanonSIM
- Battery: Non-removable 2870 mAh (Xperia 10); Non-removable 3000 mAh (Xperia 10 Plus)
- Charging: Fast Charging PD 2.0 18 W
- Rear camera: Dual-Camera Setup; Xperia 10: Primary: Samsung ISOCELL S5K3L6; 13 MP, f/2.0, 27mm (wide), 1/3.0", 1.12 µm, PDAF; Depth: Samsung ISOCELL S5K4E8; 5 MP, f/2.4, 1/4.0", 1.4 µm; Xperia 10 Plus: Primary: Sony Exmor RS IMX 486; 12 MP, f/1.8, 27mm (wide), 1/2.8", 1.25 µm, PDAF; Telephoto: Samsung ISOCELL S5K4H7; 8 MP, f/2.4, 53mm, 1/4.0", 1.12 µm, PDAF, 2x optical zoom; Features: LED flash, HDR, panorama; Video: 4K@30fps, 1080p@30fps
- Front camera: Samsung ISOCELL S5K4H7; 8 MP, f/2.0, 24mm (wide), 1/4.0", 1.12 µm; Features: HDR; Video: 1080p@30fps
- Display: 1080p (2520 × 1080) IPS LCD capacitive touchscreen, 21:9 aspect ratio, 16M colors, Corning Gorilla Glass 5: Xperia 10: 6 in (150 mm), 457 ppi; Xperia 10 Plus: 6.5 in (170 mm), 422 ppi
- Sound: Loudspeaker, 3.5mm headphone jack
- Media: Music, Sony Album
- Connectivity: Wi-Fi 802.11 a/b/g/n/ac (2.4/5GHz); Bluetooth 5.0; USB-C; NFC; GPS with Assisted GPS; GLONASS
- Data inputs: Sensors: Accelerometer; Barometer; Fingerprint scanner (side-mounted, always on); Proximity sensor
- Model: I3113, I4113, I4193, I3123 (Xperia 10); I3213, I4213, I4293, I3223 (Xperia 10 Plus)
- Codename: Xperia 10: Kirin; Xperia 10 Plus: Mermaid
- Development status: Discontinued
- Website: Official website (Xperia 10) Official website (Xperia 10 Plus)

The Sony Xperia 10 and Sony Xperia 10 Plus are Android smartphones marketed and manufactured by Sony. Part of Sony's midrange Xperia series, they were unveiled at the annual Mobile World Congress event on February 25, 2019 alongside the Xperia L3 and Xperia 1.

== Design ==
The Xperia 10 and Xperia 10 Plus have a polycarbonate unibody construction, with Corning Gorilla Glass 5 protecting the screen. The screen has asymmetrical bezels, with the top bezel housing the earpiece, front-facing camera, notification LED and various sensors. The fingerprint sensor and power and volume buttons are located on the right side of the device, while the 3.5mm headphone jack is located on the top; the card slot is located on the left side. The rear cameras are centered and located near the top of the phone, with the LED flash above. The bottom edge has the primary microphone and a downward-firing speaker next to the USB-C port. Four colors are available, three of which are shared: Black, Navy and Silver. The fourth color is unique, Pink for the 10 and Gold for the 10 Plus.

== Specifications ==
=== Hardware ===
The Xperia 10 is powered by the Qualcomm Snapdragon 630 SoC and the Adreno 508 GPU, while the Xperia 10 Plus is powered by the Qualcomm Snapdragon 636 SoC and the Adreno 509 GPU. Both have a single storage option, 64 GB of eMMC. The 10 is available with 3 GB of RAM (or 4 GB of RAM for China); the 10 Plus is available with 4 GB of RAM (or 6 GB of RAM for China). MicroSD card expansion on is supported on both models up to 512 GB with a single-SIM or hybrid dual-SIM setup. The display is a 21:9 1080p (1080 × 2520) IPS LCD panel. The 10 and 10 Plus have 6-inch (152mm) and 6.5-inch (165mm) screens respectively, with a pixel density of 457 ppi and 422 ppi. Both phones support fast charging at 18 W over USB-C. The battery size is 2870mAh for the 10 and 3000mAh for the 10 Plus. A dual camera setup is present on the rear. The 10 has a 13 MP primary lens with PDAF and a 5 MP depth sensor. The 10 Plus has a 12 MP primary lens and an 8 MP telephoto lens, both of which have PDAF. The front-facing camera on both has an 8 MP sensor.

=== Software ===
The Xperia 10 and Xperia 10 Plus launched with Android 9 "Pie", but were upgraded to Android 10 in May 2020. Xperia 10 and 10 Plus were the last Xperia midrange devices to be eligible for only one OS update.

Both can also run Sailfish OS and are devices officially supported by Jolla.

Preceded by Sony Xperia XA2	Sony Xperia 10; 2019	Succeeded by Sony Xperia 10 II
