= Tribal Worldwide =

- Formerly: Tribal DDB
- Company type: Subsidiary
- Industry: Advertising
- Founded: 2000; 25 years ago
- Parent: DDB Worldwide
- Website: tribalworldwide.com

Tribal Worldwide (Formerly Tribal DDB) is a global network of interactive agencies, established in 2000, when the advertising company DDB integrated all its interactive-web properties under the Tribal brand. Tribal Worldwide is part of Omnicom Group's DDB Worldwide.

== Specialization ==
Tribal Worldwide specializes in interactive marketing, namely: websites, digital campaigns, digital communication, microsites, online video, web banners and more. Tribal Worldwide has areas of specialty that they call "centers of excellence" in the following areas: planning, gaming, mobile, iTV, search engine marketing, search engine optimization, management consulting, eCommerce, SONAR, and Health & Wellness. Tribal Worldwide also does pro bono work and is affiliated with the Ad Council. Tribal clients have included Pepsi, Lipton, Volkswagen, Neutrogena, Philips, Nokia, McDonald's, Netflix, Hewlett-Packard and Nike among others.

== Awards ==
=== 2009 ===
- Cannes - Film Grand Prix (for Carousel)

=== 2008 ===
- AdAge Global Agency of the Year

== See also ==
- Tribal Worldwide London - UK office
