= Sony Xperia 5 II =

Android phablet

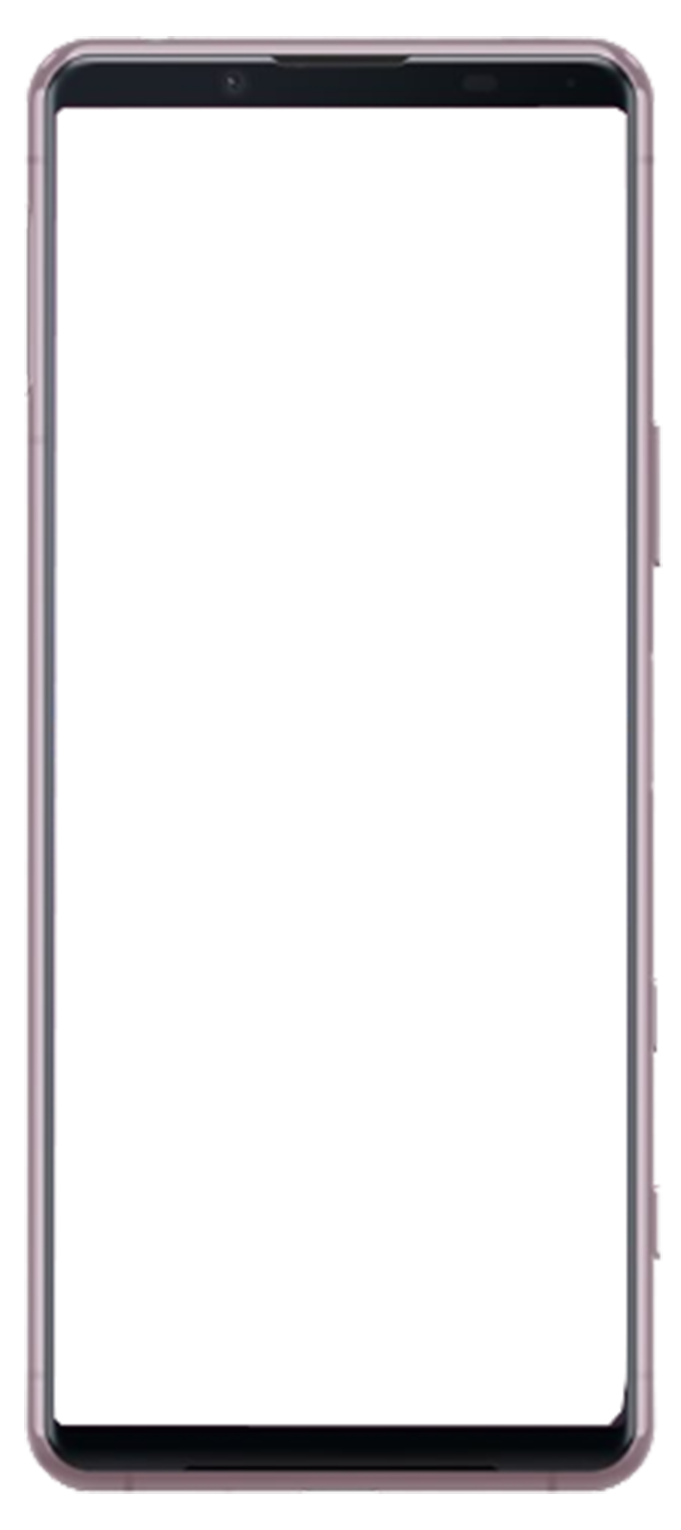
- Sony Xperia 5 II in Pink
- Also known as: Sony Xperia 5 Mark II
- Brand: Sony
- Manufacturer: Sony Mobile Communications
- Type: Phablet
- Series: Sony Xperia
- Family: Sony Xperia 5 Series
- First released: 12 October 2020; 6 years ago
- Availability by region: Taiwan: 12 October 2020; 6 years ago; Japan: 17 October 2020; 5 years ago (SOG02 and A002SO models) 12 November 2020; 5 years ago (SO-52A model) 28 May 2021; 5 years ago (XQ-AS42 model); Europe: 19 October 2020; 5 years ago; Singapore: 12 November 2020; 5 years ago; North America: 4 December 2020; 5 years ago
- Predecessor: Sony Xperia 5 Sony Xperia 10 Plus
- Successor: Sony Xperia 5 III
- Related: Sony Xperia 1 II
- Compatible networks: 2G; 3G; 4G LTE; 5G; WiMAX 2+ (SOG02 model only)
- Form factor: Slate
- Colors: Black; Blue; Pink; Purple; Yellow
- Dimensions: 158 mm (6.2 in) H 68 mm (2.7 in) W 8 mm (0.31 in) D
- Weight: 163 g (5.7 oz)
- Operating system: Android 10, upgradable to Android 11 and Android 12
- System-on-chip: Qualcomm Snapdragon 865
- CPU: Octa-core (1x 2.84 GHz Gold Prime, 3x 2.42 GHz Gold, 4x 1.8 GHz Silver) Kryo 585
- GPU: Adreno 650
- Modem: Qualcomm Snapdragon X55 5G
- Memory: 8 GB LPDDR5 RAM
- Storage: Universal Flash Storage (UFS 3.0); 128 GB (XQ-AS52, XQ-AS62, SO-52A, SOG02 and A002SO models); 256 GB (XQ-AS42 and XQ-AS72 models)
- Removable storage: microSD, expandable up to 1 TB
- Battery: Non-removable Li-ion 4000 mAh; USB PD 3.0 21W Charging
- Rear camera: 12.2 MP (Sony Exmor RS IMX557), f/1.7, 24mm (wide), 1/1.7", 1.8 μm, predictive Dual Pixel PDAF, 5-axis OIS; 12.2 MP (Samsung ISOCELL S5K3T2), f/2.4, 70mm (telephoto), 1/3.4", 1.0 μm, predictive Dual Pixel PDAF, 3x optical zoom, 5-axis OIS; 12.2 MP (Sony Exmor RS IMX363), f/2.2, 16mm (ultra-wide), 1/2.55", predictive Dual Pixel PDAF Zeiss optics, HDR, eye tracking 4K@24/30/60/120fps, 1080p@30/60/120fps
- Front camera: 8 MP (Samsung ISOCELL S5K4H7), f/2.0, 24mm (wide), 1/4", 1.0 μm, HDR, 1080p@30fps (5-axis gyro-EIS)
- Display: 6.1 in (150 mm) 1080p 21:9 (2520 × 1080) HDR OLED CinemaWide™ display, 120 Hz refresh rate, ~449 pixel density Gorilla Glass 6 HDR BT.2020; 8-bit color depth (16M colors)
- Sound: Stereo speakers (hybrid), 3.5 mm audio jack
- Media: Music
- Connectivity: Wi-Fi 802.11 a/b/g/n/ac/ax (2.4/5GHz); Bluetooth 5.0; USB-C (supports DisplayPort); NFC; GPS with Assisted GPS; Galileo; GLONASS; BeiDou; Mobile FeliCa/Osaifu-Keitai (XQ-AS42, SO-52A, SOG02 and A002SO models only)
- Data inputs: Sensors: Accelerometer; Barometer; Fingerprint scanner (side-mounted, always on); Gyroscope; Proximity sensor; Colour spectrum sensor
- Water resistance: IP65/68
- Model: XQ-AS42 (Dual SIM) (Japan; SIM-unlocked); XQ-AS52 (Dual SIM) (Europe); XQ-AS62 (Dual SIM Unlocked) (North America); XQ-AS72 (Dual SIM) (Asia outside Japan); SO-52A (Single SIM) (Japan; NTT Docomo); SOG02 (Single SIM) (Japan; au/Okinawa Cellular); A002SO (Single SIM) (Japan; SoftBank)
- Codename: PDX-206
- Development status: Released, Discontinued
- Made in: Thailand
- Website: Official website

The Sony Xperia 5 II (Note: The model's Roman numeral suffix is read "Mark II" (mark two).) is an Android smartphone marketed and manufactured by Sony Mobile. Part of Sony's flagship Xperia series, the phone was announced on September 17, 2020. A less expensive and more compact variant of the Xperia 1 II, the Xperia 5 II belongs to Sony's handset lineup of 2020. This also includes the flagship Xperia 1 II and the entry-level Xperia 10 II. The phone was released worldwide in October 2020.

The Xperia 5 II ships with support for 5G NR in Europe and Asia (making it Sony's second Xperia device to support this network), while the United States will ship with a 4G variant. Although 5G networks are supported, it only supports "sub-6" 5G, meaning it is not compatible with millimeter-wave (mmWave) networks.

== Design ==
The Xperia 5 II retains Sony's signature square design that is seen on previous Xperia phones. It is built similarly to the Xperia 1 II, using anodized aluminum for the frame and Corning Gorilla Glass 6 for the screen and back panel, as well as IP65 and IP68 certifications for water resistance. The build has a pair of symmetrical bezels on the top and the bottom, where the front-facing dual stereo speakers and the front camera are placed. The left side of the phone contains a slot for a SIM card and a microSDXC card, while the right side contains a fingerprint reader embedded into the power button, a volume rocker and a shutter button. A dedicated Google Assistant button is located between the power and shutter buttons. The earpiece, front-facing camera, notification LED and various sensors are housed in the top bezel. The bottom edge has the primary microphone and USB-C port; the rear cameras are arranged in a vertical strip. The phone ships in four colours: Black, Gray, Blue and Pink.

== Specifications ==
=== Hardware ===
The Xperia 5 II is powered by the Qualcomm Snapdragon 865 SoC and an Adreno 650 GPU, accompanied by 8 GB of LPDDR4X RAM. It has 128 or 256 GB of UFS internal storage, and microSD expansion is supported up to 1 TB with a hybrid dual-SIM setup. The display is smaller and has a lower resolution than the Xperia 1 II, using a 6.1 in 21:9 1080p (2520 × 1080) HDR OLED panel, which results in a pixel density of 449 ppi. While the size and resolution are unchanged, it features a 120 Hz refresh rate. The camera system is similar to the Xperia 1 II in terms of hardware (a 12 MP primary lens, a 12 MP telephoto lens and a 12 MP ultrawide lens with an 8 MP front camera), but it lacks a 3D iToF sensor. The telephoto lens has been upgraded from 2x to 3x optical zoom, and the ultrawide lens gains autofocus. Additionally, the lenses add ZEISS' T✻ (T-Star) anti-reflective coating. Software improvements include JPG+RAW shooting and HDR for 4K/120fps slow motion videos. The battery capacity has been increased to 4000mAh, the same as the 1 II, despite the smaller body. USB Power Delivery 3.0 is supported at 21 W over USB-C, although it lacks wireless charging capabilities. The device includes a 3.5 mm audio jack, which was removed from its predecessor, as well as an active external amplifier.

=== Software ===
The Xperia 5 II runs on Android 10. Sony has also paired the phone's camera tech with a "Pro" mode developed by Sony's camera division CineAlta, whose features take after Sony's Alpha camera lineup.
