= Sony Xperia 1 II =

2020 Android smartphone

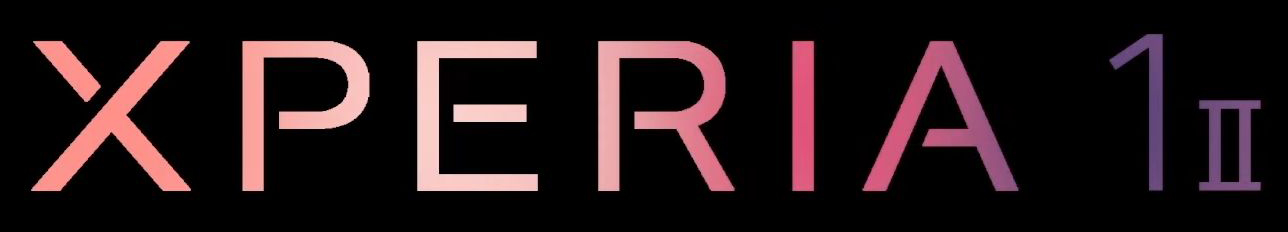

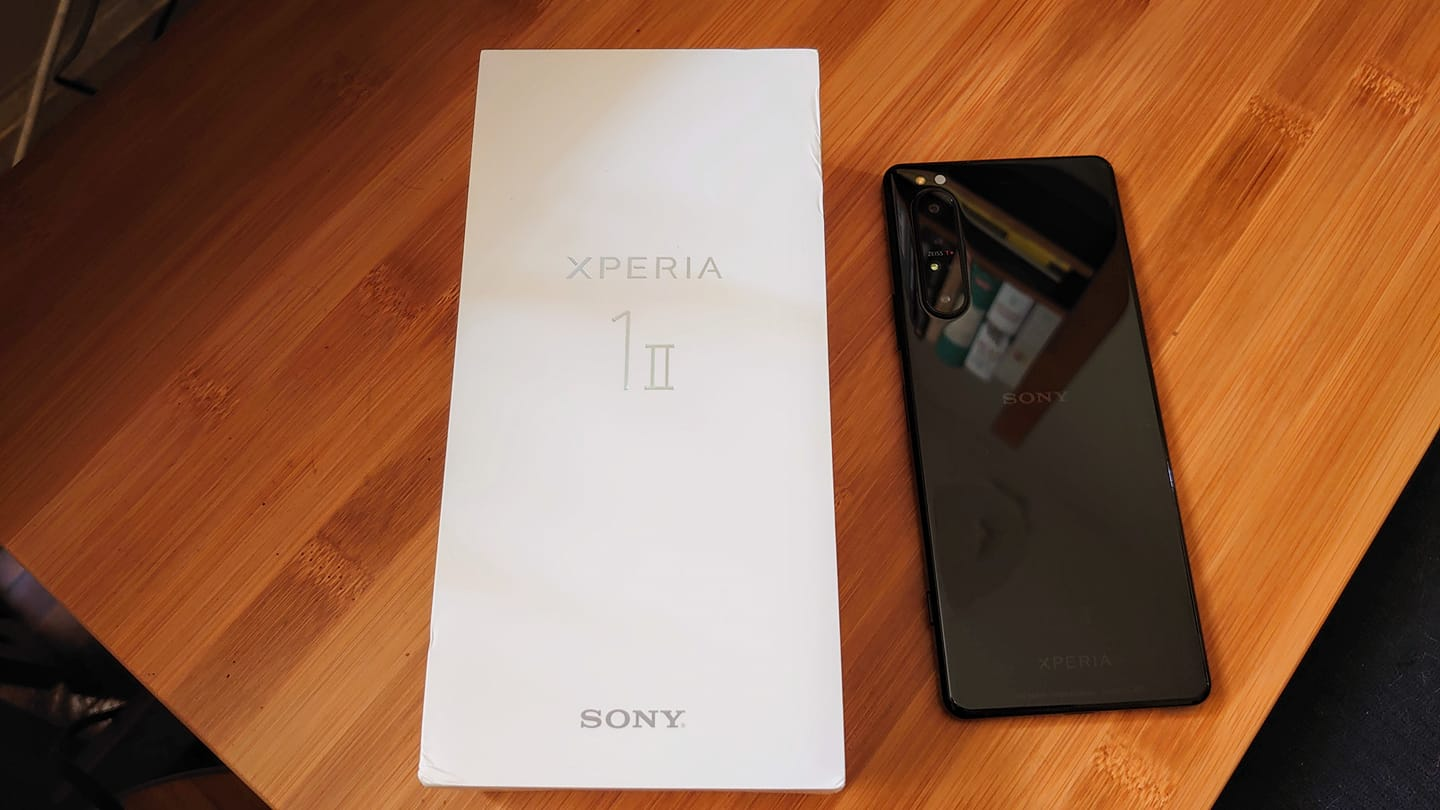
- Also known as: Sony Xperia 1 Mark II
- Brand: Sony
- Manufacturer: Sony Mobile
- Type: Phablet
- Series: Sony Xperia
- Family: Sony Xperia 1 Series
- First released: 22 May 2020; 6 years ago
- Availability by region: Japan: 22 May 2020; 6 years ago (SOG01) 18 June 2020; 6 years ago (SO-51A) 30 October 2020; 5 years ago (XQ-AT42); Germany: 15 June 2020; 6 years ago; United Kingdom: 18 June 2020; 6 years ago; United States: 24 July 2020; 6 years ago; Thailand: 2 October 2020; 6 years ago; Singapore: 9 October 2020; 6 years ago; Mainland China: 21 October 2020; 5 years ago
- Predecessor: Sony Xperia 1
- Successor: Sony Xperia 1 III
- Related: Sony Xperia 5 II; Sony Xperia Pro; Sony Xperia 10 II
- Compatible networks: 2G; 3G; 4G LTE; 5G; WiMAX 2+ (SOG01 model only)
- Form factor: Slate
- Colors: Black; White; Mirrored Slate (Purple); Mirror Lake Green; Frosted Black
- Dimensions: 166 mm (6.5 in) H 71.1 mm (2.80 in) W 7.9 mm (0.31 in) D
- Weight: 181 g (6.4 oz)
- Operating system: Android 10, upgradable to Android 12; 2 OS updates, 2 years of security patches
- System-on-chip: Qualcomm Snapdragon 865
- CPU: Octa-core (1x 2.84 GHz Gold Prime, 3x 2.42 GHz Gold, 4x 1.8 GHz Silver) Kryo 585
- GPU: Adreno 650
- Modem: Qualcomm Snapdragon X55 5G
- Memory: 8 GB LPDDR5 (SO-51A, SOG01, XQ-AT51 and XQ-AT52 in Black/White/Purple); 12 GB LPDDR5 (XQ-AT42, XQ-AT52 in Green and XQ-AT72)
- Storage: Universal Flash Storage (UFS 3.0) 128 GB (SO-51A and SOG01 models); 256 GB (XQ-AT42, XQ-AT51, XQ-AT52 and XQ-AT72 models)
- Removable storage: microSDXC, expandable up to 1 TB
- SIM: nanoSIM + nanoSIM
- Battery: Non-removable Li-ion 4000 mAh; USB PD 3.0 21W Charging; Qi 11W Wireless Charging
- Charging: Fast Charging USB PD 3.0 21 W Charging; Qi 11 W Wireless Charging
- Rear camera: 12.2 MP (Sony Exmor RS IMX557), f/1.7, 24mm (wide), 1/1.7", 1.8 μm, predictive Dual Pixel PDAF, 5-axis OIS; 12.2 MP (Samsung ISOCELL S5K3T2), f/2.4, 70mm (telephoto), 1/3.4", 1.0 μm, predictive Dual Pixel PDAF, 3x optical zoom, 5-axis OIS; 12.2 MP (Sony Exmor RS IMX363), f/2.2, 16mm (ultra-wide), 1/2.55", predictive Dual Pixel PDAF; 3D iToF sensor Zeiss optics, HDR, eye tracking 4K@24/25/30/60/120fps, 1080p@30/60/120fps
- Front camera: 8 MP (Samsung ISOCELL S5K4H7), f/2.0, 24mm (wide), 1/4", 1.0 μm, 5-axis gyro-EIS, HDR Photo, Portrait selfie, Display flash, Hand and Smile Shutter 1080p@30fps
- Display: 6.5 in (170 mm) 4K 21:9 (3840 x 1644) HDR OLED CinemaWide™ display, ~643 pixel density Gorilla Glass 6 HDR10; HLG; 10-bit color depth
- Sound: Front Stereo speakers and 3.5 mm headphone jack 4 Pole; Cirrus Logic CS35L41 Speaker Amp x2 High-Resolution Audio; High-Resolution Audio Wireless; 360 Reality Audio hardware decoding Dolby Atmos tuned by Sony Pictures and Sony music DSEE Ultimate; Stereo Recording; SBC; AAC; Qualcomm® aptX™ Qualcomm® aptX™ HD; Qualcomm® aptX™ adaptive Qualcomm® aptX™ TWS+ LDAC
- Media: Game Enhancer, Music
- Connectivity: Wi-Fi 802.11 a/b/g/n/ac/ax (2.4/5GHz); Bluetooth 5.1; USB-C (supports DisplayPort); NFC; GPS with Assisted GPS; Galileo; GLONASS; BeiDou; 1seg (SO-51A and SOG01 models only); Mobile FeliCa/Osaifu-Keitai (XQ-AT42, SO-51A and SOG01 models only)
- Data inputs: Sensors: Accelerometer; Barometer; Fingerprint scanner (side-mounted, always on); Gyroscope; Proximity sensor; Colour spectrum sensor
- Water resistance: IP65/IP68 Water/dust resistant
- Model: XQ-AT42 (Dual SIM) (Japan; SIM-unlocked); XQ-AT51 (Single SIM) (America, Europe); XQ-AT52 (Dual SIM) (Asia exclude Japan and Mainland China); XQ-AT72 (Dual SIM) (Mainland China); SO-51A (Single SIM) (Japan; NTT Docomo); SOG01 (Single SIM) (Japan; au/Okinawa Cellular)
- Codename: PDX-203
- Development status: Released, Discontinued
- Made in: Thailand
- Other: IP65/IP68 Water/dust resistant PS4 Remote Play; DUALSHOCK®4 Control compatibility Game Enhancer; Dynamic Vibration System
- Website: Official Website

The Sony Xperia 1 II (Note: The model's Roman numeral suffix is read "Mark II" (mark two).) is an Android smartphone manufactured by Sony Mobile. Part of Sony's Xperia series, the phone was announced along with the mid-range Xperia 10 II on February 24, 2020. Key upgrades over its predecessor, the Xperia 1, include support for 5G connectivity and Qi wireless charging, and a triple-lens camera which incorporates ZEISS-branded lenses with T✻ (T-Star) anti-reflective coating as well as technology brought over from Sony's Alpha camera lineup.

The Xperia 1 II ships with support for 5G NR in Europe and Asia (making it Sony's first Xperia device to support this network), while the United States ships with a 4G variant. Although 5G networks are supported, it only supports “sub-6” 5G, meaning it is not compatible with millimeter-wave (mmWave) networks.

== Design ==
The Xperia 1 II retains Sony's signature square design that is seen on previous Xperia phones. The phone has Corning Gorilla Glass 6 protection on the front and back as well as IP65 and IP68 certifications for water resistance. The build has a pair of symmetrical bezels on the top and the bottom, where the front-facing dual stereo speakers and the front camera are placed. The left side of the phone contains a compartment for a SIM card and a microSD card, while the right side contains a fingerprint reader embedded into the power button, a volume rocker and a shutter button. The rear cameras are arranged in a vertical strip. The phone shipped in five colors with the first three: Black, Purple and White available globally. There are also two colors exclusive to East Asian markets, Frosted Black for Japan and Mainland China and Mirror Lake Green for Mainland China and Taiwan.

== Specifications ==
=== Hardware ===
The Xperia 1 II has a Qualcomm Snapdragon 865 SoC and an Adreno 650 GPU, accompanied by 8 GB or 12 GB of RAM, 256 GB storage space (which can be expanded up to 1 TB via the microSD card slot), and one nano SIM card slot. The display is identical to the one on the Xperia 1, a 6.5-inch 4K HDR OLED with a 21:9 aspect ratio, which Sony claims offers “unprecedented color accuracy”. It is also capable of displaying one billion colors; most smartphone displays have sixteen million colors. The phone has a 4000 mAh battery, and supports wireless charging. The phone has front-facing dual stereo speakers and a 3.5 mm audio jack. The latter feature was not present on Sony's previous flagship phone, and technology journalists noted it as unusual in flagship smartphones in 2020.

=== Camera ===
The phone has a triple 12 MP camera setup and a 3D iToF sensor on the back, and an 8 MP camera on the front. The rear cameras comprise the main lens (24 mm f/1.7), the ultrawide angle lens (16 mm f/2.2), and the telephoto lens (70 mm f/2.4); each uses ZEISS' T✻ (T-Star) anti-reflective coating. The phone has support for 4K video recording for up to 60 FPS and for 2K for up to 120 FPS. Android 11 update enables 4K video recording up to 120 FPS

=== Software ===
The Xperia 1 II released with Android 10, now updated to Android 12. Sony has also paired the phone's camera tech with a “Photo Pro” mode developed by Sony's camera division α (Alpha) and a “Cinema Pro” mode developed by Sony's cinematography division CineAlta, whose features take after Sony's Alpha and CineAlta cameras.
