= Ase =

Ase may refer to:

- Ase, Nigeria, a town in Delta State, Nigeria
- -ase, a suffix used for the names of enzymes
- Aṣẹ, a Yoruba philosophical and religious concept
- American Sign Language (ISO 639-3 code: ase)

== See also ==
- Åse (disambiguation)
- ASE (disambiguation)
