= Asie (pickle) =

Danish pickled cucumber

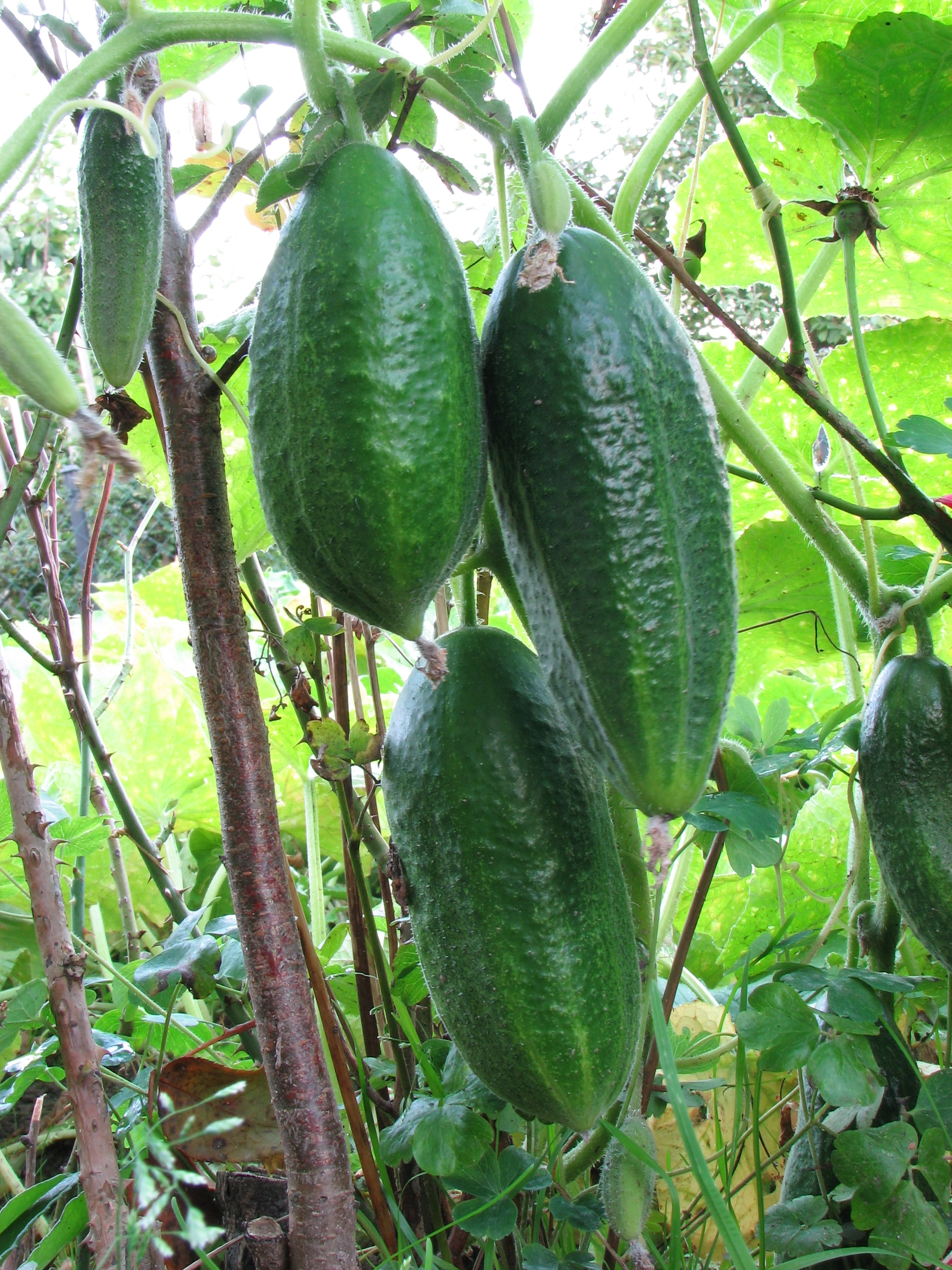
Fresh asier cucumbers.

Asie (plural: asier) is a traditional Danish pickled cucumber made from a large variety of cucumbers known as asieagurk.

== Preparation ==
Asies are pickled by peeling the asie cucumber and splitting it lengthwise. The seeds are removed, and the cavity is filled with salt. When the salt has drawn the moisture out of the cucumber, it is cut into pieces, placed in jars, and covered with a strong, boiled brine of vinegar and sugar with added spices.

== Culinary use ==
Asier are commonly served as a side dish with hot meals in Danish cuisine. They are also used as a garnish on smørrebrød (Danish open-faced sandwiches), where they contribute a fresh, sweet-sour flavor.

== See also ==
- Cucumber
- Pickling
- Danish cuisine
