= Scripting Layer for Android =

Discontinued library for running scripts

SL4A
- Original author: Damon Kohler
- Repository: github.com/damonkohler/sl4a
- Written in: C and Java
- Operating system: Android
- Type: Library
- License: Apache License 2.0
- Website: github.com/damonkohler/sl4a

The Scripting Layer for Android (abridged as SL4A, and previously named Android Scripting Environment or ASE) is a discontinued library that allows the creation and running of scripts written in various scripting languages directly on Android devices. SL4A was designed for developers with its main branch no longer being under active development.

These scripts have access to many of the APIs available to normal Java Android applications, but with a simplified interface. Scripts can be run interactively in a terminal, or in the background using the Android services architecture. Currently supported languages are:

- Python using CPython
- Perl
- Ruby using JRuby
- Lua
- BeanShell
- JavaScript using Rhino
- Tcl
- Rexx using BRexx

SL4A was first announced by Google in June 2009, and was originally named "Android Scripting Environment" (ASE). It was, however, not an official Google product, even though many of its developers have worked for Google. It was originally developed by Damon Kohler, and had grown through the contributions of many developers.

== See also ==
- Termux
- Kivy (framework)
