= Asieh Ahmadi =

Iranian daf, dayereh and tanbur player

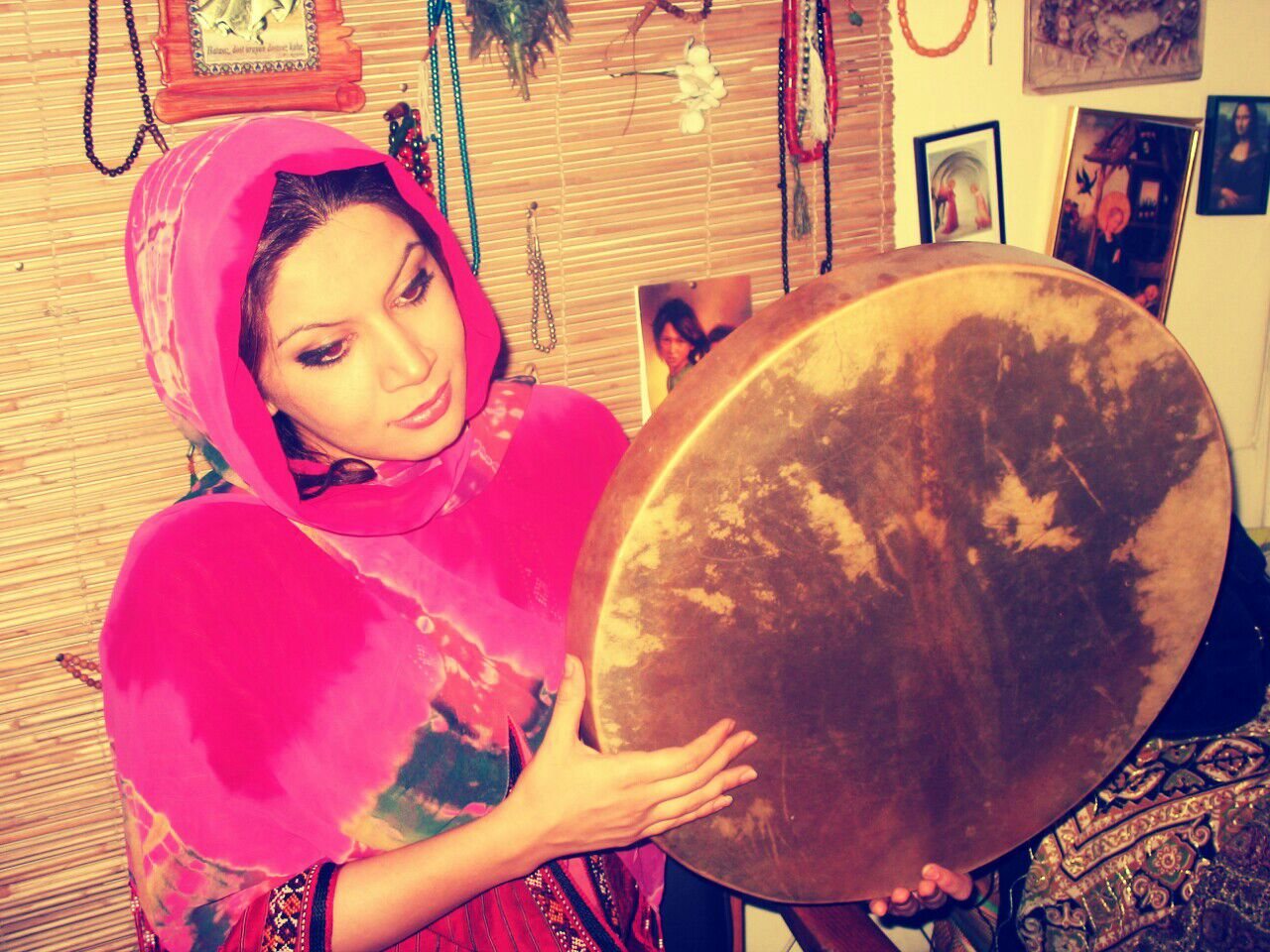

Background information
- Born: 1983 (age 42–43)
- Origin: Tehran, Iran
- Genres: Persian traditional music
- Occupation: Composer
- Instruments: Tanbur, Dayereh, Daf
- Years active: 2000–present

Asieh Ahmadi (Persian: آسیه احمدی) (born 5 June 1983 in Tehran) is an Iranian daf, dayereh and tanbur player. She is the sister of Sara Ahmadi. Ahmadi has made numerous recordings with prominent musicians including Abdolhossein Mokhtabad, Nasser Razazi, Pari Zanganeh and Simin Ghanem, and is a member of the Musical groups Hannaneh and Toranj.
