= Whopper Sacrifice =

Advertising campaign by Burger King

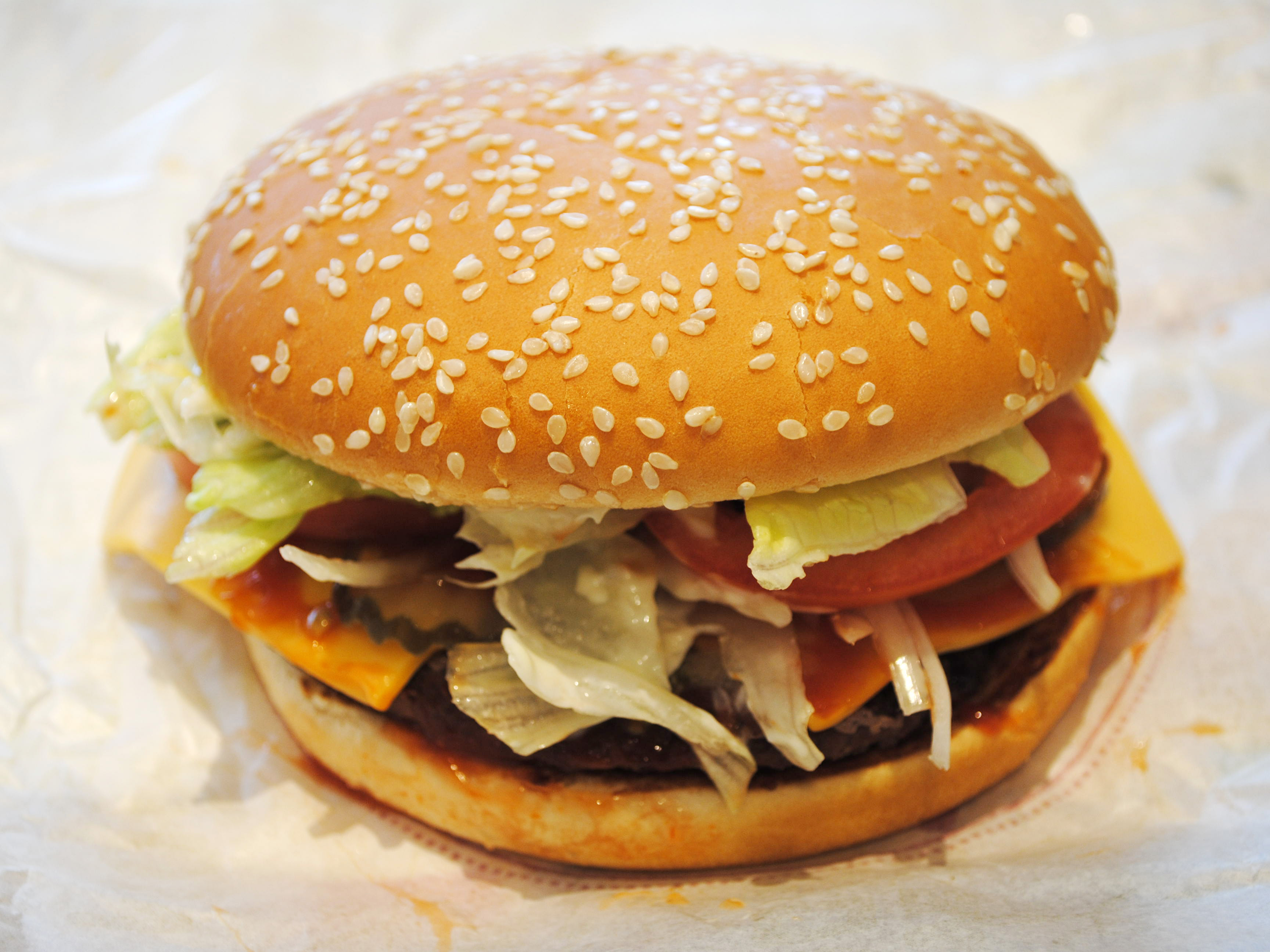
- A Whopper
- Agency: Crispin Porter + Bogusky
- Client: Burger King
- Release date: January 5-15, 2009
- Official website: whoppersacrifice.com at the Wayback Machine (archived 2009-03-06)

Whopper Sacrifice was an advertising campaign developed by Crispin Porter + Bogusky for Burger King, launched on Facebook in January 2009. The campaign's Facebook page would award users a coupon for a free Whopper after unfriending 10 of their Facebook friends. Sacrifices were made known via posts reading, “(Participant) sacrificed (victim) for a free Whopper,” and unfriended users would be sent a notification informing them they had been sacrificed. Facebook typically does not notify users when they are unfriended, out of privacy concerns, so the latter feature eventually prompted Facebook to disable the promotion 10 days after it had launched.

== Campaign ==
Whopper Sacrifice was developed following the success of other campaigns Crispin Porter + Bogusky had created for the 50th anniversary of the Whopper sandwich in 2007 and 2008, namely the Whopper Freakout and Whopper Virgins campaigns. The advertising agency already had 25,000 coupons for free Whoppers from another ongoing promotion and developed the concept to make use of the surplus. After the concept was approved by Burger King, the web application for the promotion was developed in-house by Crispin in late 2008, before launching early January 2009.

According to Crispin, the page received 35 million media impressions, with over 233,000 "sacrifices", corresponding to over 23,000 coupons awarded, during its 10-day lifespan. The web application showed graphics of users' sacrificed friends' profile pictures being burned, with the text "YOU LIKE (user), YOU *LOVE* THE WHOPPER" overlaid.

During its runtime, Crispin managers say they received repeated requests from Facebook to change the application so that it no longer sent notifications to "sacrificed" users, but chose to ignore these requests until Facebook sent a cease and desist. By the time it was filed, over 23,000 of the 25,000 free coupons had been awarded, and Crispin estimates the promotion would have been shut down soon regardless out of a shortage of coupons. Despite this, in an effort to receive greater media publicity, Crispin framed Facebook's decision as the primary cause of the end of the promotion, writing on the campaign's website "WHOPPER SACRIFICE HAS BEEN SACRIFICED."
