= Boards (magazine) =

- The cover to the final issue of Boards, published in May 2010
- Editor: Rae Ann Fera
- Categories: Trade magazine
- Frequency: Monthly
- Publisher: Brunico Communications Ltd.
- First issue: August 1999
- Final issue: May 2010
- Country: Canada
- Based in: Toronto
- Language: English
- Website: www.boardsmag.com

Boards is a former international trade publication catering to the advertising community. Launched in August 1999, the magazine was published monthly until May 2010, when a corporate restructuring of its Canadian publisher, Brunico Communications Ltd., led to the brand's shelving. Responsibility for editing the offline magazine and "Boards Online", its online equivalent, was initially split between Mark Smyka (a former senior editor of Marketing) and Liz Saunderson. Over the following decade, editorial responsibility fell to Teressa Iezzi, Sandy Hunter, and Rae Ann Fera. Eventually, editing the two branches was consolidated into a single role. The magazine was launched by Tom Symes who ran the brand from 1999 to 2003 when Jonathan Verk took over as Publisher. Verk ran the publication from 2003 - 2008 during which tome he introduced several new profitable events and published products including Boards U, The Boards Creative Workshops and a Post Production Resource Guide.

Each issue of Boards contained several regular feature columns, including: "Word" (an editorial), "Radar" (industry news), "Ideas" (commentary on various aspects of advertising), interviews with various industry figures, as well as sections catering to the various sectors of the advertising industry (creative, music and sound, post-production and editing, animation, etc.). In addition, starting in May 2009, "Boards Online" began publishing daily content updates such as "behind the scenes" features, video links, and commentary on awards ceremonies and particularly striking or successful advertising campaigns.

Editors of the magazine made a number of attempts to improve brand awareness by holding various events. These included "Boards U", an educational event for junior producers; the "Boards Creative Workshop", a networking event bringing various industry figures together; and the "First Boards Awards", an annual awards ceremony celebrating the best new advertising campaigns.
