= Advanced silicon etching =

Technology in semiconductor device fabrication

Advanced Silicon Etching (ASE) is a deep reactive-ion etching (DRIE) technique to etch deep and high aspect ratio structures in silicon. ASE was created by Surface Technology Systems Plc (STS) in 1994 in the UK. STS has continued to develop this process with faster etch rates. STS developed and first implemented the switched process, originally invented by Dr. Larmer in Bosch, Stuttgart. ASE consists in combining the faster etch rates achieved in an isotropic Si etch (usually making use of an SF_{6} plasma) with a deposition or passivation process (usually utilising a C_{4}F_{8} plasma condensation process) by alternating the two process steps. This approach achieves the fastest etch rates while maintaining the ability to etch anisotropically, typically vertically in Microelectromechanical Systems (microelectromechanical systems (MEMS)) applications.

The ASE HRM claims to be an improvement on previous generations of ICP design, now incorporating a decoupled plasma source (patent pending). The decoupled source generates high-density plasma which is allowed to diffuse into a separate process chamber. Using a specialized chamber design, the excess ions (which negatively affect process control) are reduced, leaving a uniform distribution of fluorine free-radicals at a higher density than that available from the conventional ICP sources. The higher fluorine free-radical density facilitates increased etch rates, typically over three times the etch rates achieved with the original process.
