= 21:9 aspect ratio =

Width (21) to height (9) aspect ratio

"21:9" ("twenty-one by nine" or "twenty-one to nine") is a consumer electronics (CE) marketing term to describe the ultrawide aspect ratio of 64:27 (2.3̅7̅0̅:1 or 21.3̅:9), designed to show films recorded in CinemaScope and equivalent modern anamorphic formats. The main benefit of this screen aspect ratio is a constant display height when displaying other content with a lesser aspect ratio.

The 64:27 aspect ratio of "21:9" is an extension of the existing video aspect ratios 4:3 (SDTV) and 16:9 (HDTV), as it is the third power of 4:3, where 16:9 of traditional HDTV is 4:3 squared. This allows electronic scalers and optical anamorphic lenses to use an easily implementable 4:3 (1.3̅:1) scaling factor.

$\left(\tfrac{4}{3}\right)^1 = \tfrac{4}{3} =$ SDTV

$\left(\tfrac{4}{3}\right)^2 = \tfrac{4}{3} \cdot \tfrac{4}{3} = \tfrac{16}{9} =$ HDTV

$\left(\tfrac{4}{3}\right)^3 = \tfrac{4}{3} \cdot \tfrac{4}{3} \cdot \tfrac{4}{3} = \tfrac{64}{27} =$ "21:9"

The term "21:9" was chosen as a marketing term, first used by Philips in January 2009. Due to its common denominator, 21:9 is more relatable to 16:9, the aspect ratio of regular HDTVs, rather than the more accurate 64:27. If it actually were 21:9 (2.3̅:1), the fraction could also be expressed in the reduced form as 7:3, relating to the 4:3 of standard-definition TVs.

Consumer TVs with this aspect ratio were manufactured mainly from 2010 to 2017. Due to it causing pillarboxing with standard 16:9 content, and the resulting low consumer acceptance, this screen format has rarely been used since then.

It is still prevalent in projection systems, using anamorphic lenses, and supported by a number of consumer electronics devices, including Blu-ray players and video scalers.

It is also used in computer monitors, where the term "21:9" can also represent aspect ratios of 43:18 (2.38̅:1 or 21.5:9) and 12:5 (2.4:1 or 21.6:9) in addition to 64:27. The wider screen provides advantages in multitasking as well as a more immersive gaming experience, and even wider screens with aspect ratios such as 32:9 (allowing for two 16:9 views side-by-side) are available. 21:9 phones also exist.

== Constant image height ==
With content of different aspect ratios, adjustments have to be made when showing such content on a display with a fixed aspect ratio. To avoid loss of content (due to cropping) or distortions (due to stretching), horizontal or vertical bars of a uniform color, usually black to make them less noticeable, are added to adjust the image. With the black bars being unnoticed, this has the effect of a changing image size when switching content aspect ratios.

A 21:9 display is able to present all content up to 'Scope aspect ratios at equal height, with changing vertical bars to the left and right of the image. Note how the large center circle, representing the main image area, remains at a constant size on the 21:9 display, while it changes on the other two depending on the aspect ratio of the content.

	4:3 content	16:9 content	21:9 content
4:3 TV	4:3 content on 4:3 TV	16:9 content on 4:3 TV	21:9 content on 4:3 TV
16:9 TV	4:3 content on 16:9 TV	16:9 content on 16:9 TV	21:9 content on 16:9 TV
21:9 TV	4:3 content on 21:9 TV	16:9 content on 21:9 TV	21:9 content on 21:9 TV

== Uses ==
=== Cinema ===
The "21:9" digital format's aspect ratio of 64:27 (approx. 2.37:1) is positioned between the classical CinemaScope aspect ratio (1678:715, approx. 2.35:1) and the aspect ratio of modern anamorphic cinematic content (1024:429, approx. 2.39:1), matching both with only a slight deviation. Thus, 21:9 screens allow watching most films with minimal letterboxing or pillarboxing.

=== Video games ===
Most modern 3D video games support 21:9 monitors, allowing for a wider field of view (FOV) and increased immersion. In certain multiplayer games, the increased horizontal FOV from rendering at 21:9 can create a competitive advantage by revealing information not available at narrower aspect ratioes. Other games lock the horizontal FOV for 21:9 so the vertical FOV is decreased instead, giving players rendering at 21:9 a competitive disadvantage. While not as common, various 2D games also support 21:9 monitors, such as Hollow Knight: Silksong.

== Standardization ==
=== HDMI ===
As of May 2013, video timings in this 64:27 aspect ratio are supported by the technical specification that defines video timings for the HDMI interface, CTA 861-F:

- 1280×720p, anamorphic pixel aspect ratio of 4:3
- 1680×720p, near-square pixel aspect ratio of 64:63
- 1920×1080p, anamorphic pixel aspect ratio of 4:3
- 2560×1080p, square pixel aspect ratio
- 3840×2160p, anamorphic pixel aspect ratio of 4:3

In November 2016, CTA (formerly CEA) published CTA-861-G with these additional video timings in 64:27, as well as additional frame rates (48 Hz, 100/120 Hz UHD):

- 5120×2160p, square pixel aspect ratio
- 7680×4320p, anamorphic pixel aspect ratio of 4:3
- 10240×4320p, square pixel aspect ratio

CTA-861-I, published in February 2023, provides a successor to the VIC enumeration of video timings, using a Resolution ID (RID) carried in Video Format Descriptors (VFDs). These VFDs support additional 21:9 resolutions of:

- 11520×6480p, anamorphic pixel aspect ratio of 4:3
- 15360×6480p, square pixel aspect ratio
- 15360×8640p, anamorphic pixel aspect ratio of 4:3
- 20480×8640p, square pixel aspect ratio

All of the above timings are supported at frame rates of 23.97, 24, 25, 29.97, 30, 47.95, 48, 50, 59.94, 60, 100, 119.88, 120, 143.86, 144, 200, 239.76, 240, 300, 359.64, 360, 400, 479.52, and 480 Hz, as of CTA-861-I.

=== Blu-ray ===
An effort by Panamorph in 2012 to add support for anamorphic video in a 21:9 aspect ratio to the Full HD, 3-D and Ultra HD Blu-ray specifications was unsuccessful and ultimately did not get included into the final specification. Blu-ray Discs include the letterbox bars in the encoded 16:9 picture, which means widescreen movies, without additional processing, will be shown with black bars on top and bottom. The company Folded Space, also initiated by Panamorph, was working on a proprietary solution, MFE, to put anamorphic 21:9 video onto Blu-rays in a way compatible with standard players.

== Content and source devices ==
=== Blu-ray ===
Some Blu-ray players, e.g., the Oppo BDP-203/205, or Philips BDP3200/12 and BDP9100/05, did support a 21:9 output mode. In this mode, the player has the capability to trim the letterbox bars and extract the 21:9 center portion of the movie content of a letterboxed disc, upscale it vertically, and scale and re-arrange the 16:9 menus and subtitles for that 21:9 anamorphic upscale so that no user interface elements are trimmed off with the bars.

Blu-ray subtitle shift for 21:9 display
Video and Subtitles stored on a Blu-ray	21:9 content extracted and upscaled, with subtitles shifted out of the cropped letterbox bars (anamorphic frame at video output)	Anamorphic frame shown stretched on 21:9 display, now correct and with all subtitles
21:9 content letterboxed in 16:9 frame, with subtitles	21:9 content in 16:9 anamorphic frame, with subtitles	21:9 content in 21:9 frame, with subtitles

=== Streaming services ===
Video streaming and download services use a proprietary technical infrastructure, and are not confined to the same strict rules about frame aspect ratios as standardized distribution services (such as broadcast and optical discs). They therefore often encode content as just the active frame, without any aspect ratio adjustment bars (letterbox or pillarbox bars). Movies with a 2.39:1 aspect ratio are a natural match for 21:9 output video timings, as long as the streaming clients support such video modes, and even content with other wide aspect ratios such as 2.00:1 and 2.20:1 are inherently maximizing the use of the output frame on such systems. Amazon Prime Video, YouTube, and Netflix support ultrawide movies/videos, while Tubi TV, Disney+, and Hulu still do not.

=== Apple TV ===
Apple, in September 2024, announced upcoming support for 21:9 with tvOS 18 for the Apple TV streaming box: "Available later this year, tvOS 18 brings 21:9 support for playing movies and shows on projectors, [...]"

Apple TV 4K (3rd generation, model A2737 and A2843) with tvOS 18.3 supports the new feature, with the aspect ratio choices 16:9, 21:9, 2.37:1, 2.39:1, 2.40:1, DCI 4K, and 32:9. This provides separate selections for 21:9 (presumably 7:3) and 2.37:1 (presumably 64:27). The exact scale ratios are still to be confirmed as of November 2024.

== Display devices ==
=== Flat-panel TV ===
All Blu-ray Disc content with 1920 horizontal resolution has 1080 vertical resolution, though in the case of widescreen formats wider than 16:9, the image appears on 16:9 displays with letterboxing. Philips' "Cinema 21:9" TV eliminates the black bars by scaling the 1920 horizontal resolution to its full width of 2560 and the 800+ pixels of CinemaScope images (actual pixel counts vary) is scaled to 1080 with the black space cropped. The result is an image which fills the screen, but does not provide higher quality due to the use of scaling. Despite the intention being to fill the screen with a non-letterboxed image, the zoom mode can result in some cropping at the edges. Content with the full image at 1920×1080 can be displayed in the center of the screen with pillarboxing, and should the viewer choose to not display CinemaScope content at full width, it appears windowboxed.

==== Philips ====
The Philips "Cinema 21:9" TV was the first LCD television of this aspect ratio. The first model launched was a 56-inch screen size, although it was no taller than a conventional 16:9 42-inch television. Models released in 2010 and 2011 had screen sizes of 50 and 58 inches.

Early reviews claimed that it was "one of the coolest TVs" to enter the market for some time. This set was previewed in the UK in advance of its release date of 18 June 2009. Pre-release launch events were held at numerous Philips retailers throughout June 2009.

The online advertising campaign surrounding the Cinema 21:9, titled Carousel, went on to win the most prestigious award in the advertising industry, the Grand Prix at the Cannes Lions International Advertising Festival.

In 2012, Philips stopped production on all its 21:9 televisions due to lack of demand.

==== Vizio ====
Vizio followed Philips in 2011 with their own Cinema TVs with identical resolution, similarly marketed as "21:9" in the United States.

The 58-inch TV with a panel resolution of 2560×1080 was sold in 2012 and 2013, but was then discontinued. A planned 50-inch model never made it to market.

==== Jupiter ====
Jupiter Systems in California was first to launch a full line of 5K resolution 21:9 large LCDs named Pana for the enterprise market in 2020, with engineering development that traced back to 2018. They were touch and non-touch models, with screen sizes 105" and 81", as well as a 34" desktop. In 2021, Jupiter continued with its exclusive 21:9 product offering by launching an ultra fine pitch direct view MicroLED product line, starting with 0.7mm pitch at 165" through 1.2mm pitch at 281", all in 5K 21:9 configurations.

==== LG ====
LG has a number of monitors with panel resolutions of 2560×1080 (64:27), 3440×1440 (43:18), 3840×1600 (12:5) and 5120×2160 (64:27), the latter being advertised by LG as '5K2K' with a 21:9 aspect ratio.

Other monitor manufacturers, such as Acer, AOC, Asus, BenQ, Dell, Gigabyte, HP, Iiyama, Lenovo, MSI, NEC, Philips, Samsung and Viewsonic, have since followed suit.

At the CES 2014, LG presented the 105UC9, a 105-inch curved LCD TV with a 5120×2160 panel, one of the first two ultrawide 5K screens. LG started selling the TV in early 2015 for approx. $100,000 in the U.S., the only ultrawide TV in the market that year.

==== Samsung ====
Also at CES 2014, Samsung presented a 105-inch curved LCD TV with 5120×2160 resolution as well, the other first UW5K 21:9 screen.

==== BOE ====
Chinese panel manufacturer BOE presented an Ultra-Wide 10K 21:9 TV with a resolution of 10240x4320 (UW10K) at the 2015 Display Week conference.

=== Front projection ===
Wide screen projectors with a 16:9 aspect ratio can be converted to 21:9 by attaching a 4/3 horizontal stretch or vertical squeeze anamorphic lens. This will optically scale standard projection images with e.g. 1920×1080 (FullHD) or 3840×2160 (UHD) to a 21:9 aspect ratio. These lenses are manufactured by optical companies like Isco and Zeiss, and provided to the home theater market by companies such as Panamorph.

DIY anamorphic lenses have been made with 2 or 4 triangular prisms.

Besides projectors outfitted with anamorphic lenses, Digital Projection, Projection Design and Avielo have released projectors that utilize 2560×1080 pixels of a 2560×1440 DLP chip with a spherical lens.

=== Computer monitors ===
While not primarily intended for cinematic content, computer displays have also made use of this and other wide aspect ratios, marketed as "21:9", to provide expanded desktop space. Common resolutions in the market are listed below:

Resolutions	Aspect ratio		
2560×1080, 5120×2160, 7680×3240, 10240×4320	64:27	2.3̅7̅0̅	21 1/3:9
3440×1440, 5160×2160, 6880×2880	43:18	2.38̅	21 1/2:9
1920×800, 2880×1200, 3840×1600, 4320×1800, 5760×2400, 7680×3200, 8640×3600	12:5	2.4	21 3/5:9

The ultrawide page states PC monitor aspect ratios outside the cinematic 2.35:1 to 2.40:1 range.

=== Smartphones ===
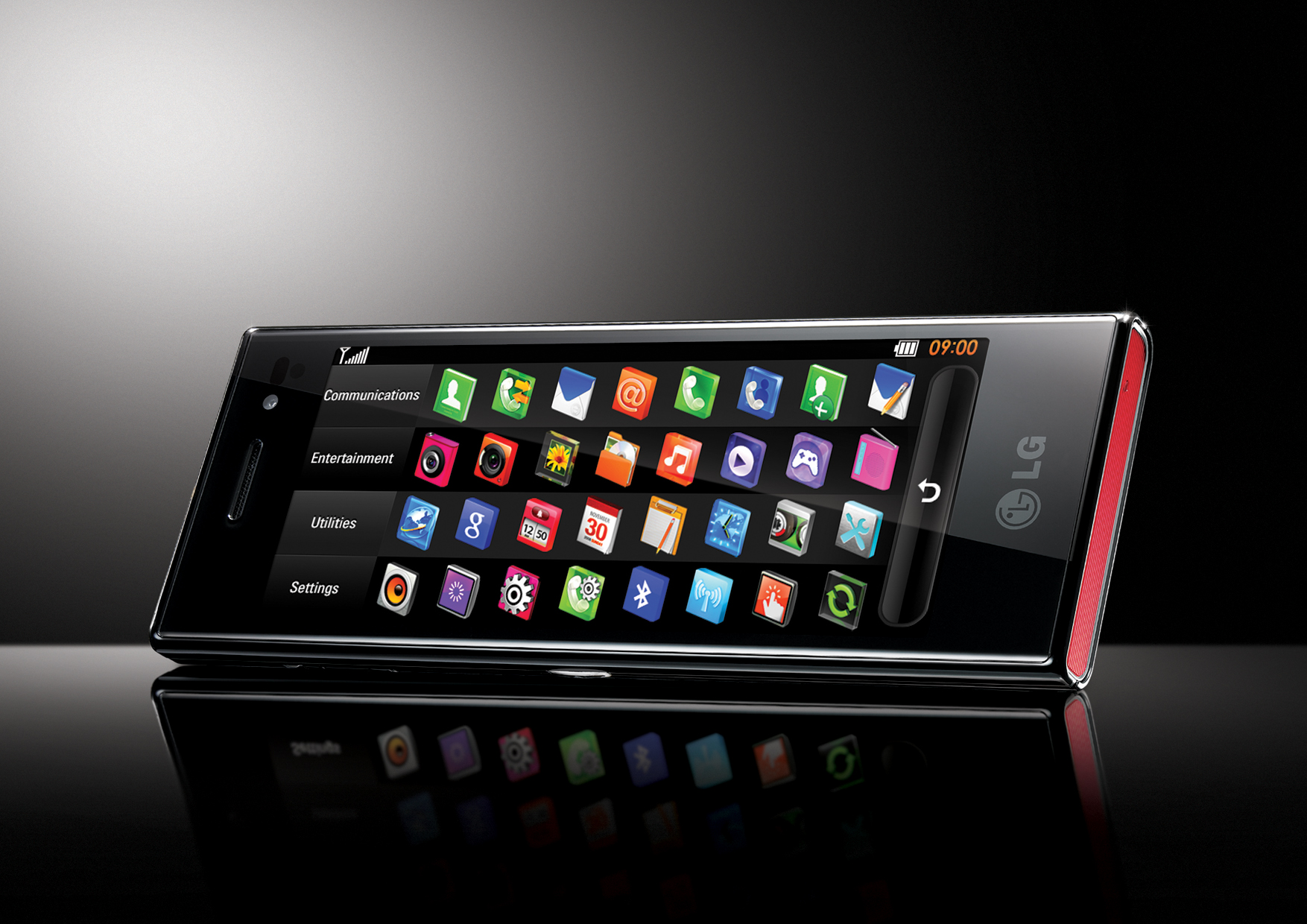
The LG New Chocolate (BL40) was the first mobile device with a 21:9 aspect ratio, using a 4-inch TFT display.

On February 25, 2019, Sony launched their latest flagship device, the Xperia 1, with the world's first 21:9 ultra-wide 4K HDR-enabled OLED (6.5") display in a smartphone. They have trademarked the name CinemaWide for use in their latest ultra-wide Xperia devices. It is not the first mobile device to use a 21:9 aspect ratio display; that recognition belongs to the LG New Chocolate, released in 2009. It has a 4" TFT display with a resolution of 345×800 pixels. The Samsung Galaxy Fold smartphone/tablet folding hybrid, with its 4.6" Super AMOLED cover display, and the Xperia 10 and 10 Plus are among the first modern devices with ultra-wide displays. Motorola introduced two 21:9 smartphones in 2019, the One Vision in May and the One Action in August, both with a 6.3" FHD+ IPS LCD screen.

Note that both Motorola and Sony chose to use a screen resolution of 2520×1080, rather than the CE resolution of 2560×1080, as defined in CTA-861. This leads to the device to have a "true" 21:9 (7:3) aspect ratio, rather than the normal CE aspect ratio of 64:27. The Xperia 1 also has an odd aspect ratio of 320:137, and would have been able to meet 64:27 with a more even resolution of 3840×1620. Sony does not adhere to consumer standards, as with their home theater projectors that feature a 4096×2160 4K resolution, rather than the CE resolution of 3840×2160. 4096×2160 is a resolution only relevant in digital cinema (DCI), where movie theater projectors feature this resolution with either letterboxed 4096×1716 or pillarboxed 3996×2160 content for "Scope" (2.39:1) and "Flat" (1.85:1) aspect ratios, respectively. The full panel aspect ratio of 256:135 is unfit for normal consumer content with a 16:9 container aspect ratio.

Device	Display specs	Resolution (px × px)	Density (ppi)
LG New Chocolate (BL40)	4-inch HVGA TFT LCD	345 × 800	217
Sony Xperia L4	6.2-inch HD+ IPS LCD	720 × 1680	295
Sony Xperia 1, II, III, IV, V	6.5-inch 4K OLED	1644 × 3840	643
Sony Xperia 5, II, III, IV, V, 10 V	6.1-inch Full HD+ OLED	1080 × 2520	449
Sony Xperia 10	6.0-inch Full HD+ IPS LCD	1080 × 2520	457
Sony Xperia 10 II, III, IV	6.0-inch Full HD+ OLED	1080 × 2520	457
Sony Xperia 10 Plus	6.5-inch Full HD+ IPS LCD	1080 × 2520	422
Meizu 20 Infinity, 21 Pro	6.8-inch AMOLED	1368 × 3192	511
Motorola One Vision, Action	6.3-inch Full HD+ IPS LCD	1080 × 2520	435
Motorola One 5G, Moto G100	6.7-inch Full HD+ IPS LCD	1080 × 2520	409
Oppo Find N2 Flip, N3 Flip	6.8-inch Full HD+ AMOLED	1080 × 2520	403

== See also ==
- Display aspect ratio
- Ultrawide formats
