= Mobile phone =

Portable device to make telephone calls using a radio link

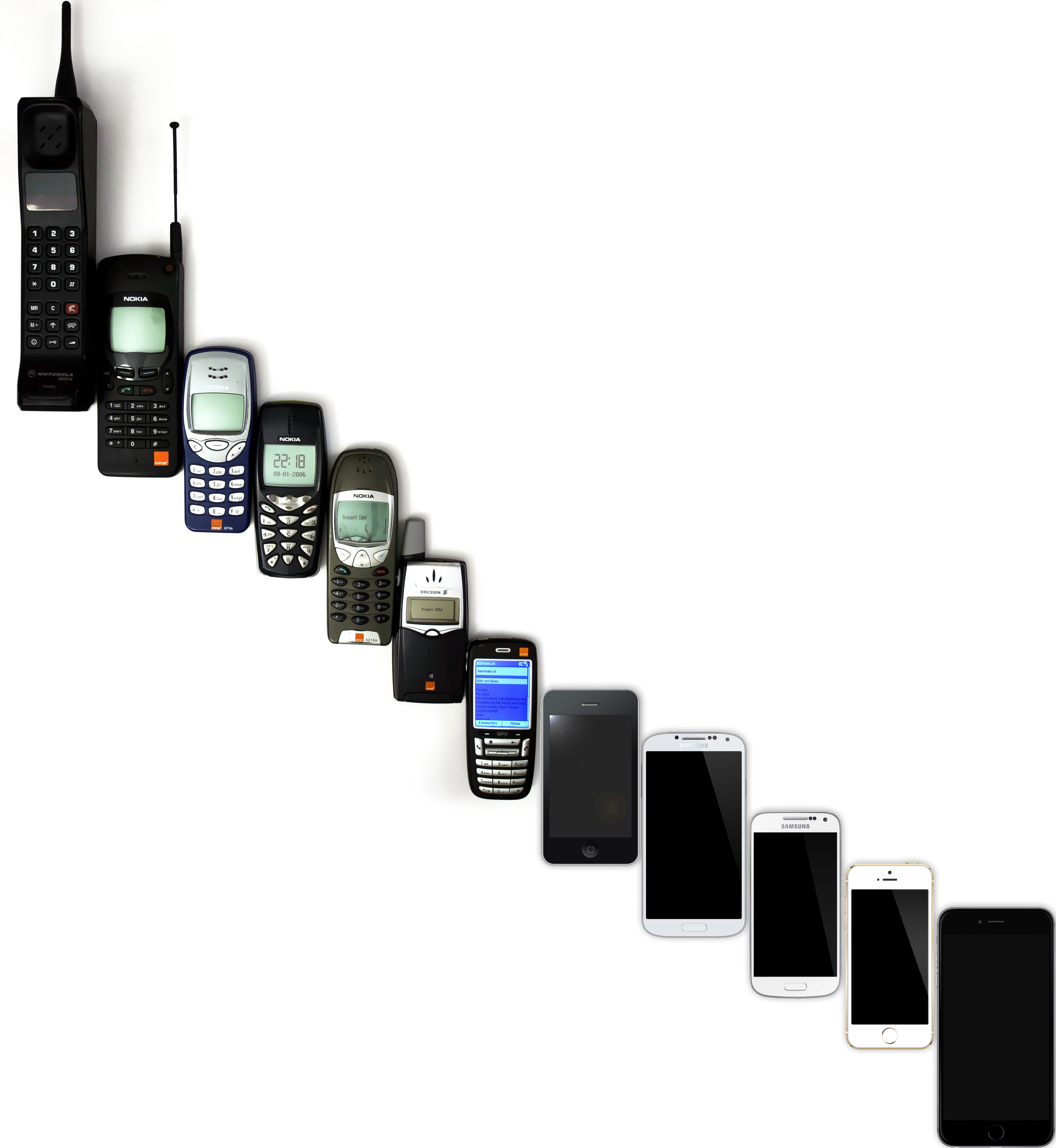
Two decades of evolution of mobile phones, from a 1992 Motorola DynaTAC 8000X to the 2014 iPhone 6 Plus

Share of population with a mobile phone

Mobile cellular subscriptions per 100 people

A mobile phone or cell phone is a portable wireless telephone that allows users to make and receive calls over a radio frequency link while moving within a designated telephone service area, unlike fixed-location phones (landline phones). This radio frequency link connects to the switching systems of a mobile phone operator, providing access to the public switched telephone network (PSTN). Modern mobile telephony relies on a cellular network architecture, which is why mobile phones are often referred to as 'cell phones' in North America.

Beyond traditional voice communication, digital mobile phones have evolved to support a wide range of additional services. These include text messaging, ad-hoc networking, multimedia messaging, email, and internet access (via LTE, 5G NR, or Wi-Fi), as well as short-range wireless technologies like Bluetooth, infrared, and ultra-wideband (UWB).

Mobile phones also support a variety of multimedia capabilities, such as digital photography, video recording, and gaming. In addition, they enable multimedia playback and streaming, including video content, as well as radio and television streaming. Furthermore, mobile phones offer satellite-based services, such as navigation and messaging, as well as business applications and payment solutions (via scanning QR codes or near-field communication (NFC)). Mobile phones offering only basic features are often referred to as feature phones (slang: dumbphones), while those with advanced computing power are known as smartphones.

The first handheld mobile phone was demonstrated by Martin Cooper of Motorola in New York City on 3 April 1973, using a handset weighing c. 2 kilograms (4.4 lbs). In 1979, Nippon Telegraph and Telephone (NTT) launched the world's first cellular network in Japan. In 1983, the DynaTAC 8000x was the first commercially available handheld mobile phone. From 1993 to 2024, worldwide mobile phone subscriptions grew to over 9.1 billion; enough to provide one for every person on Earth. In 2024, the top smartphone manufacturers worldwide were Samsung, Apple and Xiaomi; smartphone sales represented about 50 percent of total mobile phone sales. For feature phones as of 2016, the top-selling brands were Samsung, Nokia and Alcatel.

Mobile phones are considered an important human invention as they have been one of the most widely used and sold pieces of consumer technology. The growth in popularity has been rapid in some places; for example, in the UK, the total number of mobile phones overtook the number of houses in 1999. Today, mobile phones are globally ubiquitous, and in almost half the world's countries, over 90% of the world population, or approximately 7.2 billion people, owns at least one.

== Name ==
"Mobile phone" is the most common English-language term, while the term "cell phone" is in more common use in North America – both are in essence shorter versions of "mobile telephone" and "cellular telephone", respectively. Often in colloquial terms it is referred to as simply phone, mobile or cell. A number of alternative words have also been used to describe a mobile phone, most of which have fallen out of use, including: "mobile handset", "wireless phone", "mobile terminal", "cellular device", "hand phone", and "pocket phone".

== History ==
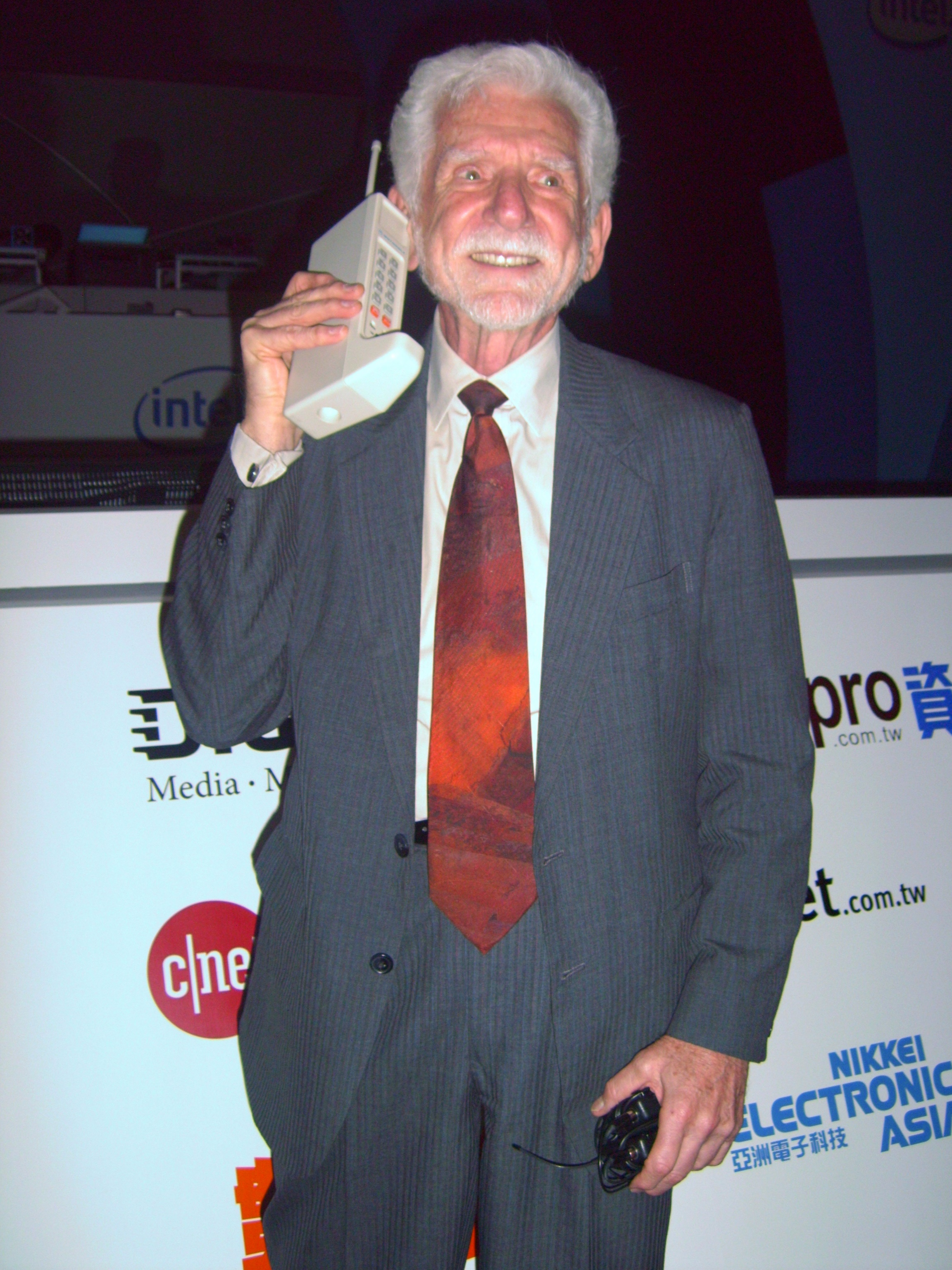
Martin Cooper of Motorola, shown here in a 2007 reenactment, made the first publicized handheld mobile phone call on a prototype DynaTAC model on 3 April 1973.

A handheld mobile radio telephone service was envisioned in the early stages of radio engineering. In 1917, Finnish inventor Eric Tigerstedt filed a patent for a "pocket-size folding telephone with a very thin carbon microphone". Early predecessors of cellular phones included analog radio communications from ships and trains. The race to create truly portable telephone devices began after World War II, with developments taking place in many countries. The advances in mobile telephony have been traced in successive "generations", starting with the early zeroth-generation (0G) services, such as Bell System's Mobile Telephone Service and its successor, the Improved Mobile Telephone Service. These 0G systems were not cellular, supported a few simultaneous calls, and were very expensive.

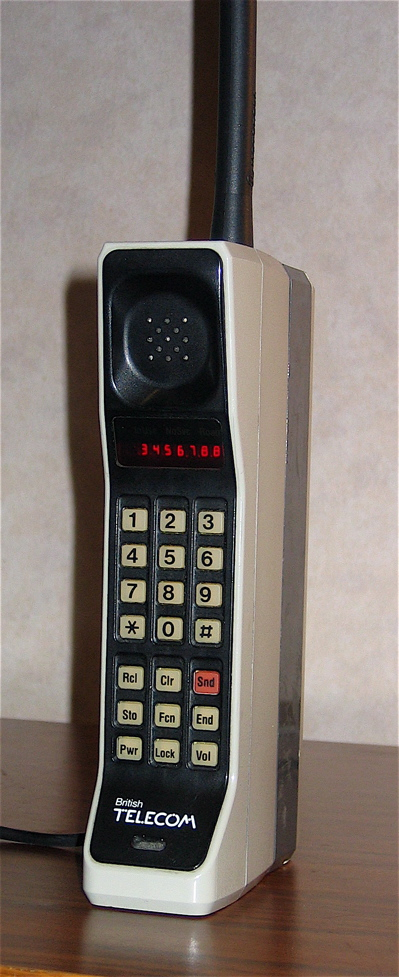
The Motorola DynaTAC 8000X. In 1983, it became the first commercially available handheld cellular mobile phone.

Mobile phone technology has progressed significantly since its origins, evolving from large car-mounted systems to compact, handheld devices. Early mobile phones required vehicle installation due to their size and power needs. A major breakthrough came in 1973, when the first handheld cellular mobile phone was demonstrated by John F. Mitchell and Martin Cooper of Motorola, using a handset weighing 2 kilograms (4.4 lb). Cooper made the first ever call on a cell phone when he called Joel S. Engel, a rival of his who worked for AT&T, saying, "I'm calling you on a cell phone, but a real cell phone, a personal, handheld, portable cell phone."

The first commercial automated cellular network (1G) analog was launched in Japan by Nippon Telegraph and Telephone in 1979. This was followed in 1981 by the simultaneous launch of the Nordic Mobile Telephone (NMT) system in Denmark, Finland, Norway, and Sweden. Several other countries then followed in the early to mid-1980s. These first-generation (1G) systems could support far more simultaneous calls but still used analog cellular technology. In 1983, the DynaTAC 8000x was the first commercially available handheld mobile phone.

In 1991, the second-generation (2G) digital cellular technology was launched in Finland by Radiolinja on the GSM standard. This sparked competition in the sector as the new operators challenged the incumbent 1G network operators. The GSM standard is a European initiative expressed at the CEPT ("Conférence Européenne des Postes et Telecommunications", European Postal and Telecommunications conference). The Franco-German R&D cooperation demonstrated the technical feasibility, and in 1987, a Memorandum of Understanding was signed between 13 European countries that agreed to launch a commercial service by 1991. The first version of the GSM standard had 6,000 pages. The IEEE and RSE awarded Thomas Haug and Philippe Dupuis the 2018 James Clerk Maxwell medal for their contributions to the first digital mobile telephone standard. In 2018, the GSM was used by over 5 billion people in over 220 countries. The GSM (2G) has evolved into 3G, 4G and 5G. The standardization body for GSM started at the CEPT Working Group GSM (Group Special Mobile) in 1982 under the umbrella of CEPT. In 1988, ETSI was established, and all CEPT standardization activities were transferred to ETSI. Working Group GSM became Technical Committee GSM. In 1991, it became Technical Committee SMG (Special Mobile Group) when ETSI tasked the committee with UMTS (3G). In addition to transmitting voice over digital signals, the 2G network introduced data services for mobile, starting with SMS text messages, then expanding to Multimedia Messaging Service (MMS), and mobile internet with a theoretical maximum transfer speed of 384 kbit/s (48 kB/s).

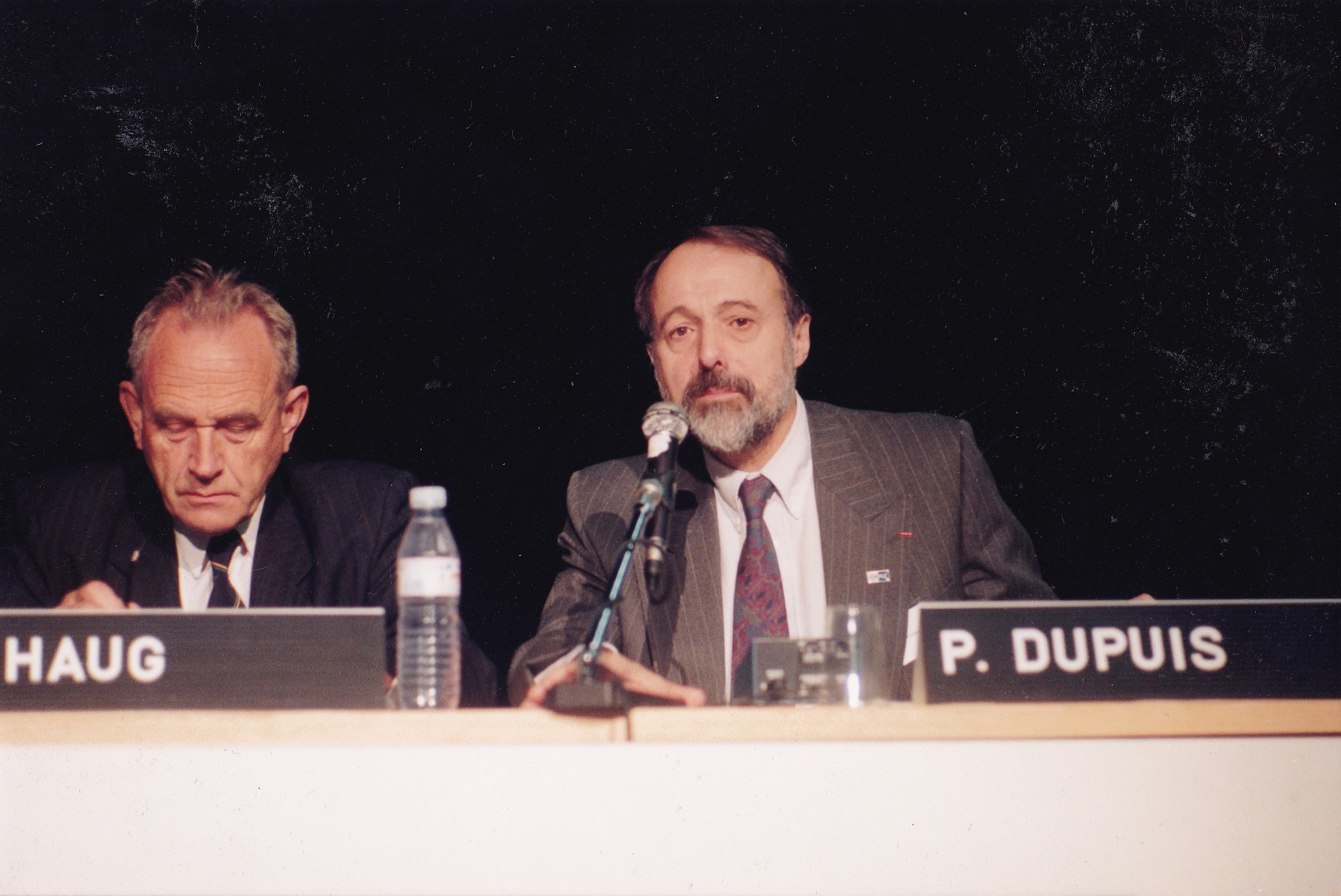
Dupuis and Haug during a GSM meeting in Belgium, April 1992

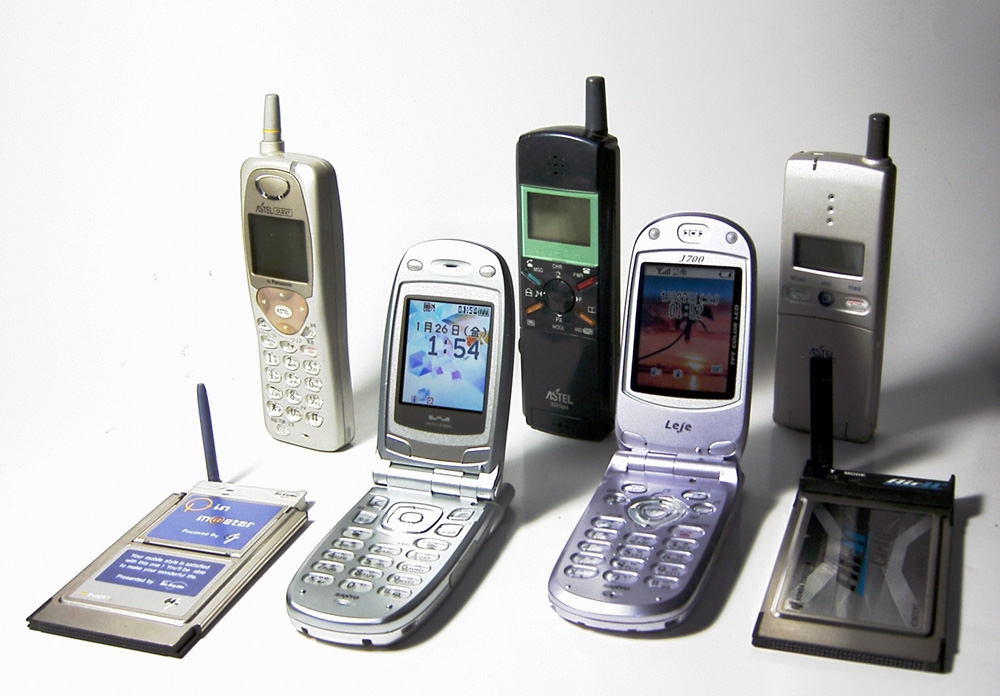
Personal Handy-phone System mobiles and modems, 1997–2003

In 2001, the third-generation (3G) was launched in Japan by NTT DoCoMo on the WCDMA standard. This was followed by 3.5G or 3G+ enhancements based on the high-speed packet access (HSPA) family, allowing UMTS networks to have higher data transfer speeds and capacity. 3G is able to provide mobile broadband access of several Mbit/s to smartphones and mobile modems in laptop computers. This ensures it can be applied to mobile Internet access, VoIP, video calls, and sending large e-mail messages, as well as watching videos, typically in standard-definition quality.

By 2009, it had become clear that, at some point, 3G networks would be overwhelmed by the growth of bandwidth-intensive applications, such as streaming media. Consequently, the industry began looking to data-optimized fourth-generation (4G) technologies, with the promise of speed improvements up to tenfold over existing 3G technologies. The first publicly available LTE service was launched in Scandinavia by TeliaSonera in 2009. In the 2010s, 4G technology has found diverse applications across various sectors, showcasing its versatility in delivering high-speed wireless communication, such as mobile broadband, the internet of things (IoT), fixed wireless access, and multimedia streaming (including music, video, radio, and television).

Deployment of fifth-generation (5G) cellular networks commenced worldwide in 2019. The term "5G" was originally used in research papers and projects to denote the next major phase in mobile telecommunication standards beyond the 4G/IMT-Advanced standards. The 3GPP defines 5G as any system that adheres to the 5G NR (5G New Radio) standard. 5G can be implemented in low-band, mid-band or high-band millimeter-wave, with download speeds that can achieve gigabit-per-second (Gbit/s) range, aiming for a network latency of 1 ms. This near-real-time responsiveness and improved overall data performance are crucial for applications like online gaming, augmented and virtual reality, autonomous vehicles, IoT, and critical communication services.

== Types ==
Active mobile broadband subscriptions per 100 inhabitants

=== Smartphone ===
Smartphones are defined by their advanced computing capabilities, which include internet connectivity and access to a wide range of applications. The International Telecommunication Union measures those with Internet connection, which it calls Active Mobile-Broadband subscriptions (which includes tablets, etc.). In developed countries, smartphones have largely replaced earlier mobile technologies, while in developing regions, they account for around 50% of all mobile phone usage.

=== Feature phone ===
Feature phone is a term typically used as a retronym to describe mobile phones which are limited in capabilities in contrast to a modern smartphone. Feature phones typically provide voice calling and text messaging functionality, in addition to basic multimedia and Internet capabilities, and other services offered by the user's wireless service provider. A feature phone has additional functions over and above a basic mobile phone, which is only capable of voice calling and text messaging. Feature phones and basic mobile phones tend to use a proprietary, custom-designed software and user interface. By contrast, smartphones generally use a mobile operating system that often shares common traits across devices.

== Infrastructure ==
Cellular networks work by only reusing radio frequencies (in this example frequencies f1–f4) in non adjacent cells to avoid interference

The critical advantage that modern cellular networks have over predecessor systems is the concept of frequency reuse allowing many simultaneous telephone conversations in a given service area. This allows efficient use of the limited radio spectrum allocated to mobile services, and lets thousands of subscribers converse at the same time within a given geographic area.

Former systems would cover a service area with one or two powerful base stations with a range of up to tens of kilometers' (miles), using only a few sets of radio channels (frequencies). Once these few channels were in use by customers, no further customers could be served until another user vacated a channel. It would be impractical to give every customer a unique channel since there would not be enough bandwidth allocated to the mobile service. As well, technical limitations such as antenna efficiency and receiver design limit the range of frequencies a customer unit could use.

A cellular network mobile phone system gets its name from dividing the service area into many small cells, each with a base station with (for example) a useful range on the order of a kilometer (mile). These systems have dozens or hundreds of possible channels allocated to them. When a subscriber is using a given channel for a telephone connection, that frequency is unavailable for other customers in the local cell and in the adjacent cells. However, cells further away can re-use that channel without interference as the subscriber's handset is too far away to be detected. The transmitter power of each base station is coordinated to efficiently service its own cell, but not to interfere with the cells further away.

Automation embedded in the customer's handset and in the base stations control all phases of the call, from detecting the presence of a handset in a service area, temporary assignment of a channel to a handset making a call, interface with the land-line side of the network to connect to other subscribers, and collection of billing information for the service. The automation systems can control the "hand off" of a customer handset moving between one cell and another so that a call in progress continues without interruption, changing channels if required. In the earliest mobile phone systems by contrast, all control was done manually; the customer would search for an unoccupied channel and speak to a mobile operator to request connection of a call to a landline number or another mobile. At the termination of the call the mobile operator would manually record the billing information.

Mobile phones communicate with cell towers that are placed to give coverage across a telephone service area, which is divided up into 'cells'. Each cell uses a different set of frequencies from neighboring cells, and will typically be covered by three towers placed at different locations. The cell towers are usually interconnected to each other and the phone network and the internet by wired connections. Due to bandwidth limitations each cell will have a maximum number of cell phones it can handle at once. The cells are therefore sized depending on the expected usage density, and may be much smaller in cities. In that case much lower transmitter powers are used to avoid broadcasting beyond the cell.

In order to handle the high traffic, multiple towers can be set up in the same area (using different frequencies). This can be done permanently or temporarily such as at special events or in disasters. Cell phone companies will bring a truck with equipment to host the abnormally high traffic.

Capacity was further increased when phone companies implemented digital networks. With digital, one frequency can host multiple simultaneous calls.

Additionally, short-range Wi-Fi infrastructure is often used by smartphones as much as possible as it offloads traffic from cell networks on to local area networks.

== Hardware ==
The common components found on all mobile phones are:

- A central processing unit (CPU), the processor of phones. The CPU is a microprocessor fabricated on a metal–oxide–semiconductor (MOS) integrated circuit (IC) chip.
- A battery, providing the power source for the phone functions. A modern handset typically uses a lithium-ion battery (LIB), whereas older handsets used nickel–metal hydride (Ni–MH) batteries.
- An input mechanism to allow the user to interact with the phone. These are a keypad for feature phones, and touch screens for most smartphones (typically with capacitive sensing).
- A display which echoes the user's typing, and displays text messages, contacts, and more. The display is typically either a liquid-crystal display (LCD) or organic light-emitting diode (OLED) display.
- Speakers for sound.
- Subscriber identity module (SIM) cards and removable user identity module (R-UIM) cards.
- A hardware notification LED on some phones

Low-end mobile phones are often referred to as feature phones and offer basic telephony. Handsets with more advanced computing ability through the use of native software applications are known as smartphones. The first GSM phones and many feature phones had NOR flash memory, from which processor instructions could be executed directly in an execute in place architecture and allowed for short boot times. With smartphones, NAND flash memory was adopted as it has larger storage capacities and lower costs, but causes longer boot times because instructions cannot be executed from it directly, and must be copied to RAM memory first before execution.

=== Central processing unit ===
Mobile phones have central processing units (CPUs), similar to those in computers, but optimised to operate in low power environments. Mobile processors commonly use heterogeneous multicore architectures, combining cores with different performance and power characteristics so that computational workloads can be distributed according to their processing requirements and energy constraints.

Mobile CPU performance depends not only on the clock rate (generally given in multiples of hertz) but also the memory hierarchy also greatly affects overall performance. Because of these problems, the performance of mobile phone CPUs is often more appropriately given by scores derived from various standardized tests to measure the real effective performance in commonly used applications.

=== Display ===
One of the main characteristics of phones is the screen. Depending on the device's type and design, the screen fills most or nearly all of the space on a device's front surface. Many smartphone displays have an aspect ratio of 16:9, but taller aspect ratios became more common in 2017.

Screen sizes are often measured in diagonal inches or millimeters; feature phones generally have screen sizes below 90 millimetres (3.5 in). Phones with screens larger than 130 millimetres (5.2 in) are often called "phablets." Smartphones with screens over 115 millimetres (4.5 in) in size are commonly difficult to use with only a single hand, since most thumbs cannot reach the entire screen surface; they may need to be shifted around in the hand, held in one hand and manipulated by the other, or used in place with both hands. Due to design advances, some modern smartphones with large screen sizes and "edge-to-edge" designs have compact builds that improve their ergonomics, while the shift to taller aspect ratios have resulted in phones that have larger screen sizes whilst maintaining the ergonomics associated with smaller 16:9 displays.

Liquid-crystal displays are the most common; others are IPS, LED, OLED, and AMOLED displays. Some displays are integrated with pressure-sensitive digitizers, such as those developed by Wacom and Samsung, and Apple's "3D Touch" system.

=== Sound ===
In sound, smartphones and feature phones vary little. Some audio-quality enhancing features, such as Voice over LTE and HD Voice, have appeared and are often available on newer smartphones. Sound quality can remain a problem due to the design of the phone, the quality of the cellular network and compression algorithms used in long-distance calls. Audio quality can be improved using a VoIP application over WiFi. Cellphones have small speakers so that the user can use a speakerphone feature and talk to a person on the phone without holding it to their ear. The small speakers can also be used to listen to digital audio files of music or speech or watch videos with an audio component, without holding the phone close to the ear.

=== Battery ===
The typical lifespan of a mobile phone battery is approximately two to three years, although this varies based on usage patterns, environmental conditions, and overall care. Most modern mobile phones use lithium-ion (Li-ion) batteries, which are designed to endure between 500 and 2,500 charge cycles. The exact number of cycles depends on factors such as charging habits, operating temperature, and battery management systems.

Li-ion batteries gradually degrade over time due to chemical aging, leading to reduced capacity and performance, often noticeable after one or two years of regular use. Unlike older battery types, such as nickel-metal hydride (Ni-MH), Li-ion batteries do not need to be fully discharged to maintain their longevity. In fact, they perform best when kept between 30% and 80% of their full charge. While practices such as avoiding excessive heat and minimizing overcharging can help preserve battery health, many modern devices include built-in safeguards. These safeguards, typically managed by the phone's internal battery management system (BMS), prevent overcharging by cutting off power once the battery reaches full capacity. Additionally, most contemporary chargers and devices are designed to regulate charging to minimize stress on the battery. Therefore, while good charging habits can positively impact battery longevity, most users benefit from these integrated protections, making battery maintenance less of a concern in day-to-day use.

Future mobile phone batteries are expected to utilize advanced technologies such as silicon-carbon (Si/C) batteries and solid-state batteries, which promise to offer higher energy densities, longer lifespans, and improved safety compared to current lithium-ion batteries.

=== SIM card ===
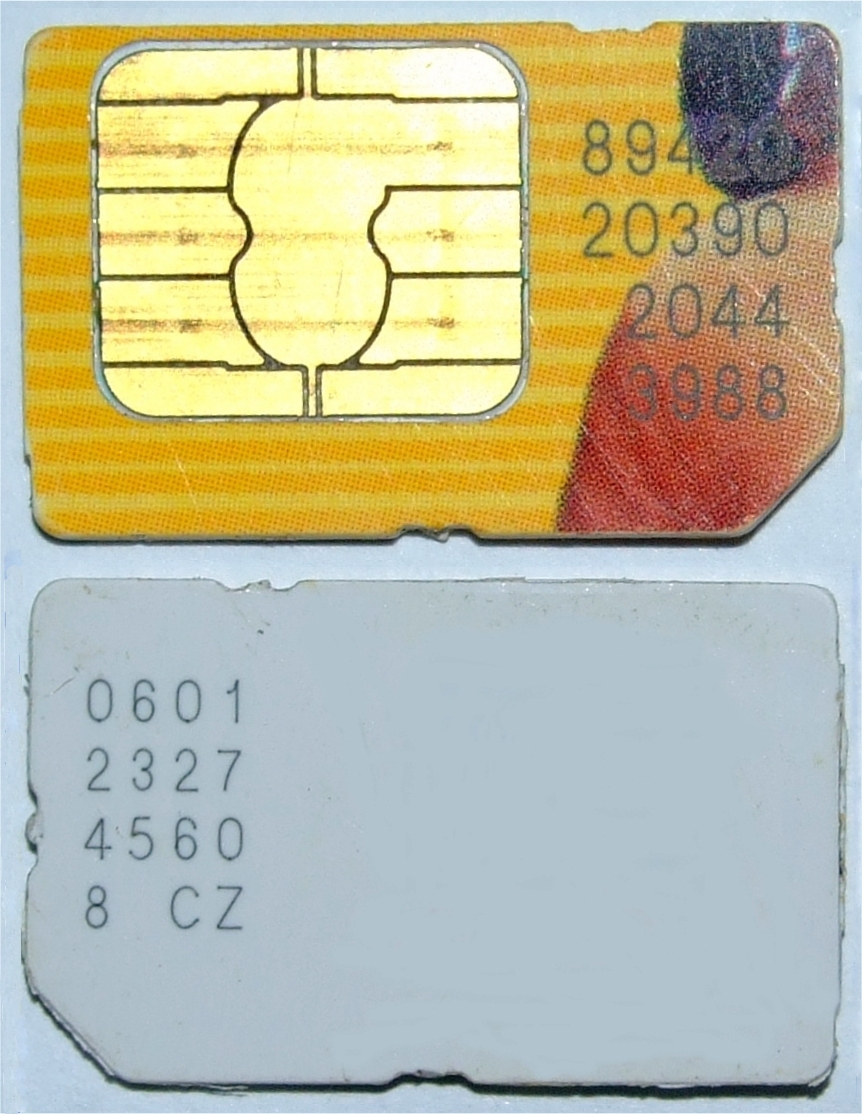
Typical mobile phone mini-SIM card

Mobile phones require a small microchip called a Subscriber Identity Module or SIM card, in order to function. The SIM card is approximately the size of a small postage stamp and is usually placed underneath the battery in the rear of the unit. The SIM securely stores the service-subscriber key (IMSI) and the K_{i} used to identify and authenticate the user of the mobile phone. The SIM card allows users to change phones by simply removing the SIM card from one mobile phone and inserting it into another mobile phone or broadband telephony device, provided that this is not prevented by a SIM lock. The first SIM card was made in 1991 by Munich smart card maker Giesecke & Devrient for the Finnish wireless network operator Radiolinja.

A hybrid mobile phone can hold up to four SIM cards, with a phone having a different device identifier for each SIM Card. SIM and R-UIM cards may be mixed together to allow both GSM and CDMA networks to be accessed. From 2010 onwards, such phones became popular in emerging markets, and this was attributed to the desire to obtain the lowest calling costs.

When the removal of a SIM card is detected by the operating system, it may deny further operation until a reboot.

== Software ==
=== Software platforms ===
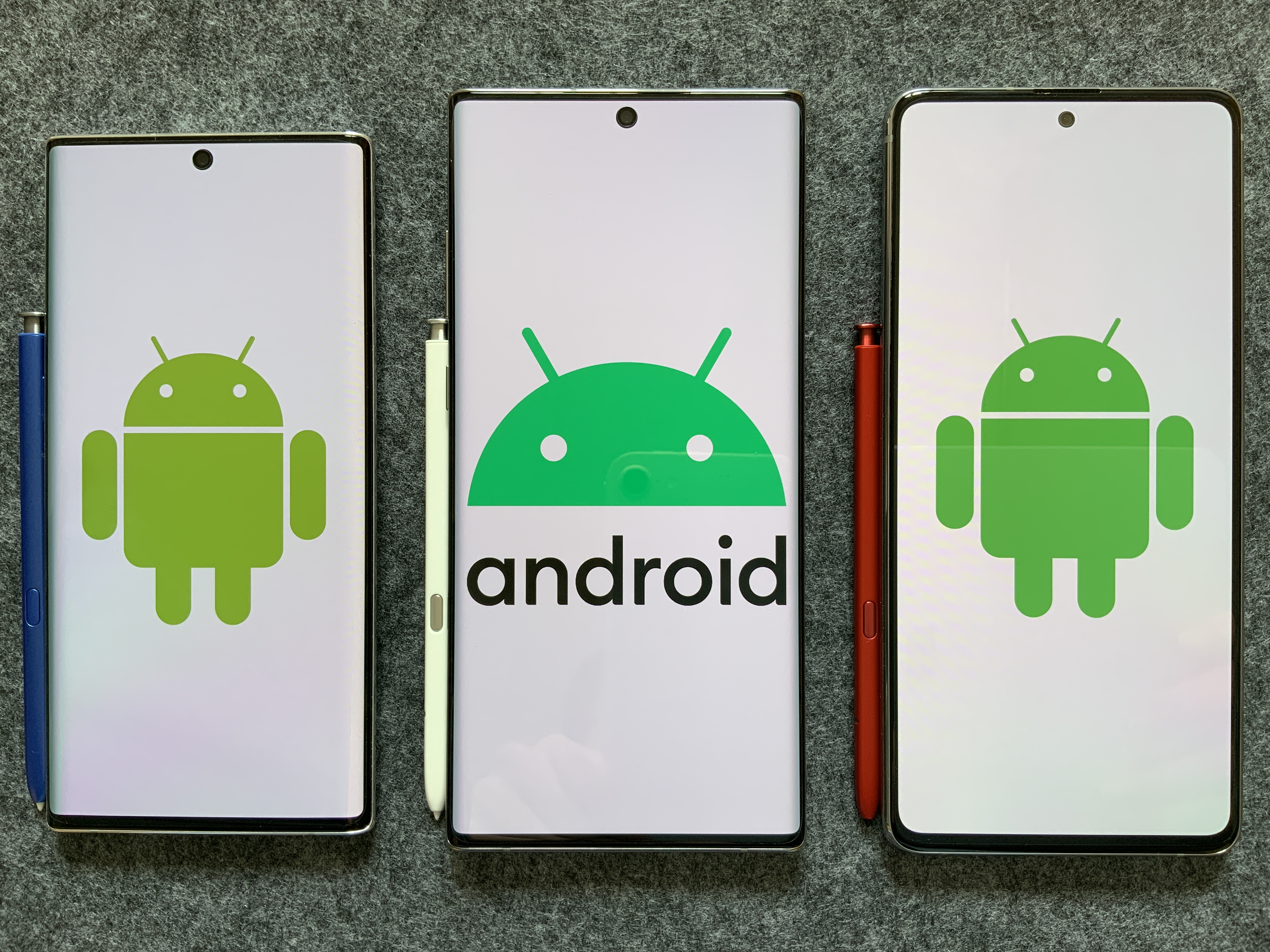
Android smartphones

Feature phones have basic software platforms whilst smartphones have a fully-featured operating system (commonly abbreviated to an OS), with the two most-used platforms being Android and iOS. Of the two, Android has been the best-selling system worldwide on smartphones since 2011, and as of March 2025, Android had 71.9% of the overall market share, while iOS had 27.7%.

=== Mobile app ===
A mobile app is a computer program designed to run on a mobile device, such as a smartphone. The term "app" is a shortening of the term "software application".

Messaging

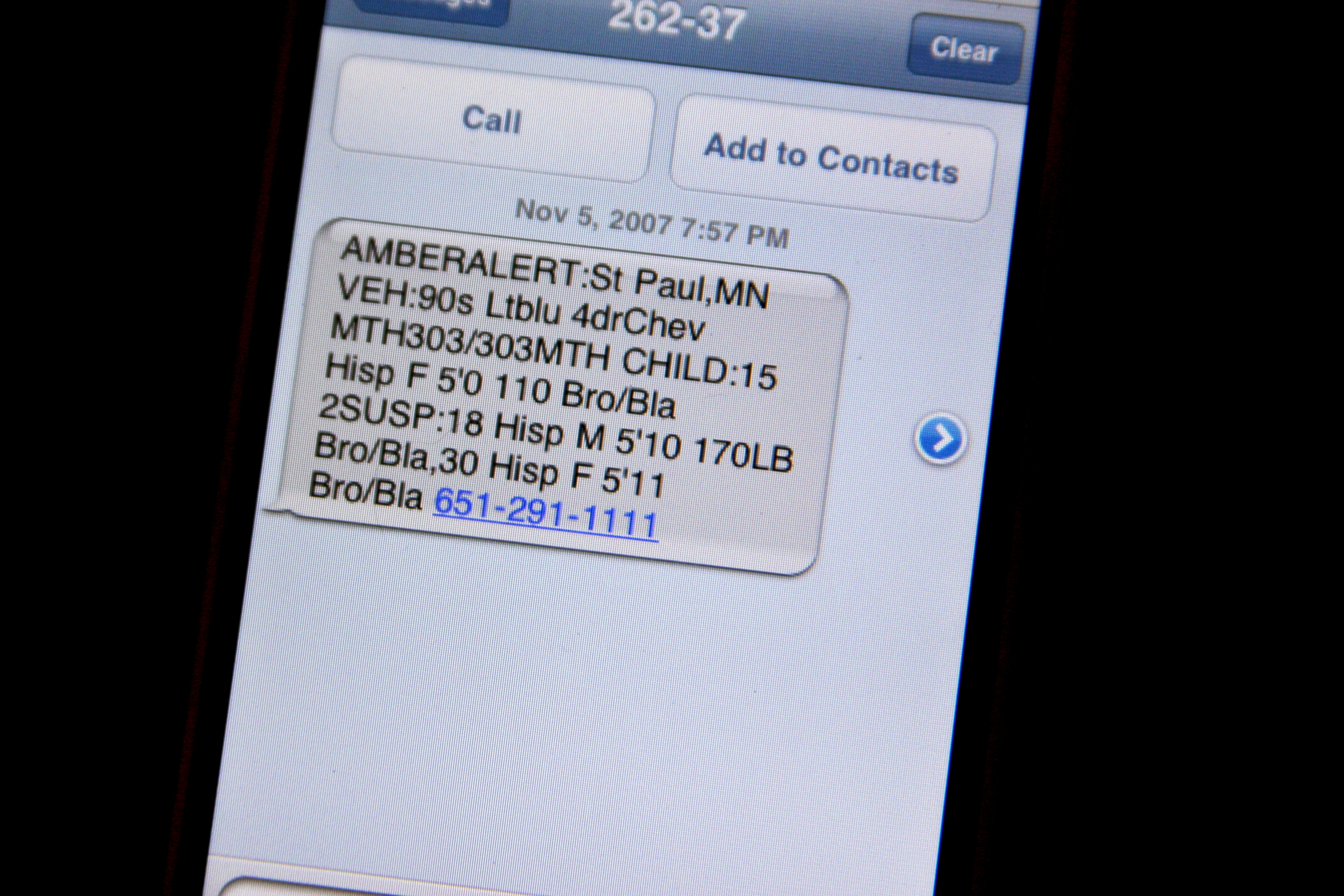
A text message (SMS)

A common data application on mobile phones is Short Message Service (SMS) text messaging. The first SMS message was sent from a computer to a mobile phone in 1992 in the UK while the first person-to-person SMS from phone to phone was sent in Finland in 1993. The first mobile news service, delivered via SMS, was launched in Finland in 2000, and subsequently many organizations provided "on-demand" and "instant" news services by SMS. Multimedia Messaging Service (MMS) was introduced in March 2002.

=== Application stores ===
The introduction of Apple's App Store for the iPhone and iPod Touch in July 2008 popularized manufacturer-hosted online distribution for third-party applications (software and computer programs) focused on a single platform. There are a huge variety of apps, including video games, music products and business tools. Up until that point, smartphone application distribution depended on third-party sources providing applications for multiple platforms, such as GetJar, Handango, Handmark, and PocketGear. Following the success of the App Store, other smartphone manufacturers launched application stores, such as Google's Android Market (later renamed to the Google Play Store), RIM's BlackBerry App World, or Android-related app stores like Aptoide, Cafe Bazaar, F-Droid, GetJar, and Opera Mobile Store. In February 2014, 93% of mobile developers were targeting smartphones first for mobile app development.

== Sales ==
=== By manufacturer ===
Market share of top-five worldwide mobile phone vendors, Q2 2022
Rank	Manufacturer	Strategy Analytics report
1	Samsung	21%
2	Apple	16%
3	Xiaomi	13%
4	Oppo	10%
5	Vivo	9%
	Others	31%
Note: Vendor shipments are branded shipments and exclude OEM sales for all vendors.

As of 2022, the top five manufacturers worldwide were Samsung (21%), Apple (16%), Xiaomi (13%), Oppo (10%), and Vivo (9%).

History

From 1983 to 1998, Motorola was market leader in mobile phones. Nokia was the market leader in mobile phones from 1998 to 2012. In Q1 2012, Samsung surpassed Nokia, selling 93.5 million units as against Nokia's 82.7 million units. Samsung has retained its top position since then.

Aside from Motorola, European brands such as Nokia, Siemens and Ericsson once held large sway over the global mobile phone market, and many new technologies were pioneered in Europe. By 2010, the influence of European companies had significantly decreased due to fierce competition from American and Asian companies, to where most technical innovation had shifted. Apple and Google, both of the United States, also came to dominate mobile phone software.

=== By mobile phone operator ===
The world's largest individual mobile operator by number of subscribers is China Mobile, which has over 902 million mobile phone subscribers as of June 2018. Over 50 mobile operators have over ten million subscribers each, and over 150 mobile operators had at least one million subscribers by the end of 2009. In 2014, there were more than seven billion mobile phone subscribers worldwide, a number that is expected to keep growing.

== Use ==
Mobile phone subscribers per 100 inhabitants. 2014 figure is estimated.

Mobile phones are used for a variety of purposes, such as keeping in touch with family members, for conducting business, and in order to have access to a telephone in the event of an emergency. Some people carry more than one mobile phone for different purposes, such as for business and personal use. Multiple SIM cards may be used to take advantage of the benefits of different calling plans. For example, a particular plan might provide for cheaper local calls, long-distance calls, international calls, or roaming.

The mobile phone has been used in a variety of diverse contexts in society. For example:

- A study by Motorola found that one in ten mobile phone subscribers have a second phone that is often kept secret from other family members. These phones may be used to engage in such activities as extramarital affairs or clandestine business dealings.
- Some organizations assist victims of domestic violence by providing mobile phones for use in emergencies. These are often refurbished phones.
- The advent of widespread text-messaging has resulted in the cell phone novel, the first literary genre to emerge from the cellular age, via text messaging to a website that collects the novels as a whole.
- Mobile telephony also facilitates activism and citizen journalism.
- The United Nations reported that mobile phones have spread faster than any other form of technology and can improve the livelihood of the poorest people in developing countries, by providing access to information in places where landlines or the Internet are not available, especially in the least developed countries. Use of mobile phones also spawns a wealth of micro-enterprises, by providing such work as selling airtime on the streets and repairing or refurbishing handsets.
- In Mali and other African countries, people used to travel from village to village to let friends and relatives know about weddings, births, and other events. This can now be avoided in areas with mobile phone coverage, which are usually more extensive than areas with just land-line penetration.
- The TV industry has recently started using mobile phones to drive live TV viewing through mobile apps, advertising, social TV, and mobile TV. It is estimated that 86% of Americans use their mobile phone while watching TV.
- In some parts of the world, mobile phone sharing is common. Cell phone sharing is prevalent in urban India, as families and groups of friends often share one or more mobile phones among their members. There are obvious economic benefits, but often familial customs and traditional gender roles play a part. It is common for a village to have access to only one mobile phone, perhaps owned by a teacher or missionary, which is available to all members of the village for necessary calls.
- Smartphones also have the use for individuals who suffer from diabetes. There are apps for patients with diabetes to self monitor their blood sugar, and can sync with flash monitors. The apps have a feature to send automated feedback or possible warnings to other family members or healthcare providers in the case of an emergency.

=== Content distribution ===
In 1998, one of the first examples of distributing and selling media content through the mobile phone was the sale of ringtones by Radiolinja in Finland. Soon afterwards, other media content appeared, such as news, video games, jokes, horoscopes, TV content and advertising. Most early content for mobile phones tended to be copies of legacy media, such as banner advertisements or TV news highlight video clips. Recently, unique content for mobile phones has been emerging, from ringtones and ringback tones to mobisodes, video content that has been produced exclusively for mobile phones.

=== Mobile banking and payment ===
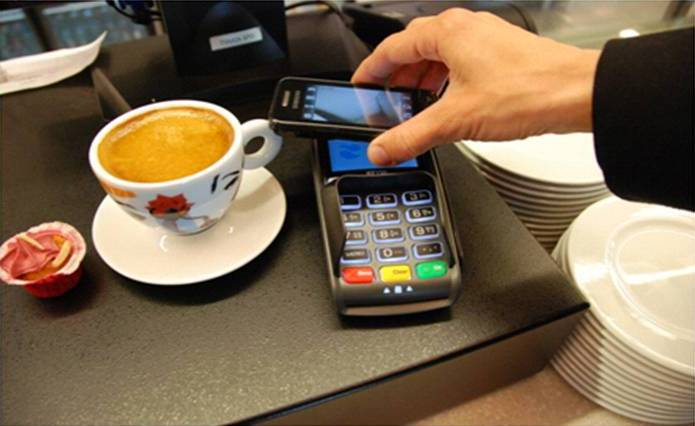
Mobile payment system

In many countries, mobile phones are used to provide mobile banking services, which may include the ability to transfer cash payments by secure SMS text message. Kenya's M-PESA mobile banking service, for example, allows customers of the mobile phone operator Safaricom to hold cash balances which are recorded on their SIM cards. Cash can be deposited or withdrawn from M-PESA accounts at Safaricom retail outlets located throughout the country and can be transferred electronically from person to person and used to pay bills to companies.

Branchless banking has also been successful in South Africa and the Philippines. A pilot project in Bali was launched in 2011 by the International Finance Corporation and an Indonesian bank, Bank Mandiri.

Mobile payments were first trialled in Finland in 1998 when two Coca-Cola vending machines in Espoo were enabled to work with SMS payments. Eventually, the idea spread and in 1999, the Philippines launched the country's first commercial mobile payments systems with mobile operators Globe and Smart.

Some mobile phones can make mobile payments via direct mobile billing schemes, or through contactless payments if the phone and the point of sale support near field communication (NFC). Enabling contactless payments through NFC-equipped mobile phones requires the co-operation of manufacturers, network operators, and retail merchants.

=== Mobile tracking ===
Mobile phones are commonly used to collect location data. While the phone is turned on, the geographical location of a mobile phone can be determined easily (whether it is being used or not) using a technique known as multilateration to calculate the differences in time for a signal to travel from the mobile phone to each of several cell towers near the owner of the phone.

The movements of a mobile phone user can be tracked by their service provider and, if desired, by law enforcement agencies and their governments. Both the SIM card and the handset can be tracked.

China has proposed using this technology to track the commuting patterns of Beijing city residents. In the UK and US, law enforcement and intelligence services use mobile phones to perform surveillance operations.

Hackers have been able to track a phone's location, read messages, and record calls, through obtaining a subscriber's phone number.

=== Electronic waste regulation ===
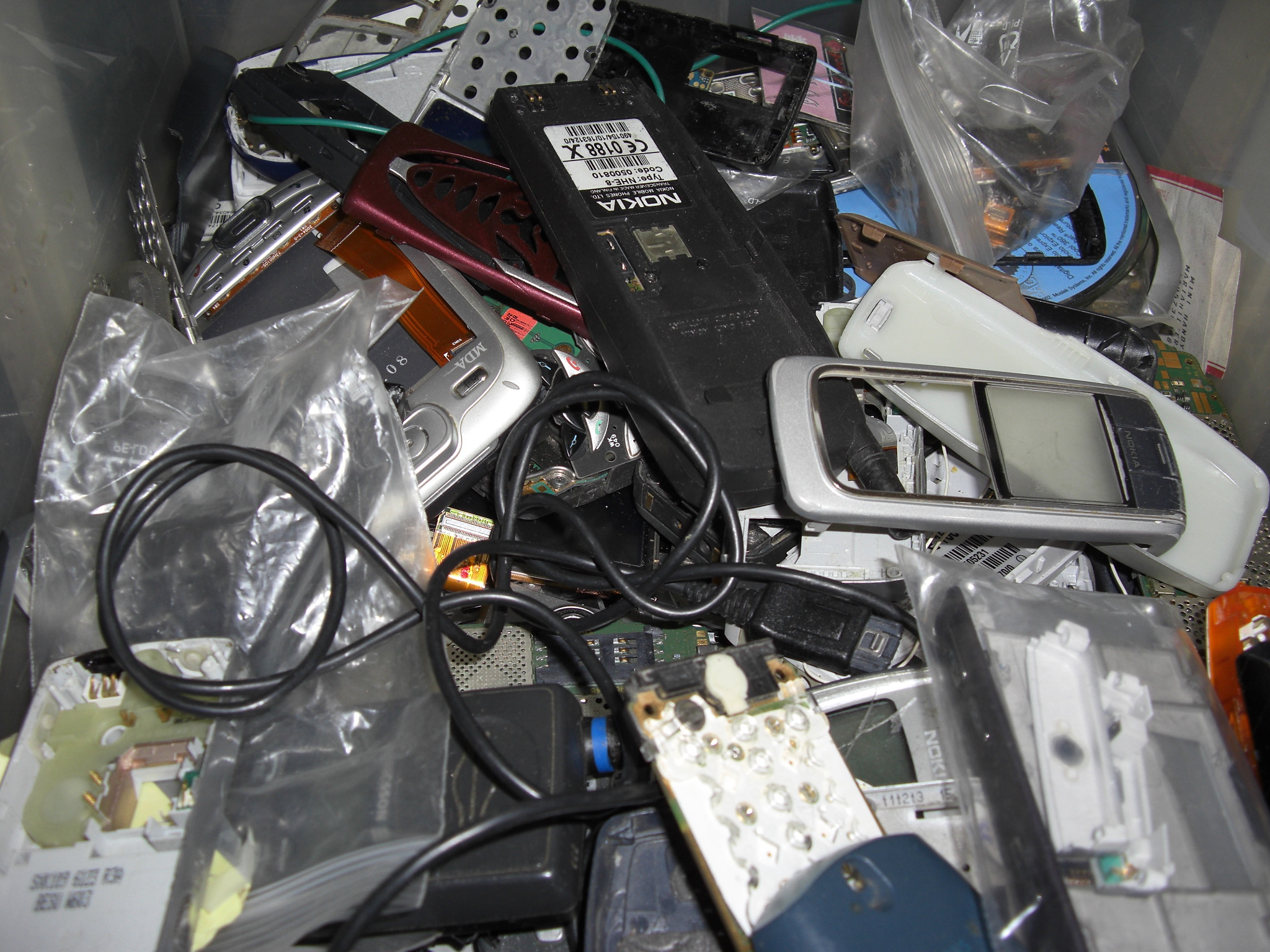
Scrapped mobile phones

Studies have shown that around 40–50% of the environmental impact of mobile phones occurs during the manufacture of their printed wiring boards and integrated circuits.

The average user replaces their mobile phone every 11 to 18 months, and the discarded phones then contribute to electronic waste. Mobile phone manufacturers within Europe are subject to the WEEE directive, and Australia has introduced a mobile phone recycling scheme.

Apple Inc. had an advanced robotic disassembler and sorter called Liam specifically for recycling outdated or broken iPhones.

=== Theft ===
According to the Federal Communications Commission, one out of three robberies involve the theft of a cellular phone. Police data in San Francisco show that half of all robberies in 2012 were thefts of cellular phones. An online petition on Change.org, called Secure our Smartphones, urged smartphone manufacturers to install kill switches in their devices to make them unusable if stolen. The petition is part of a joint effort by New York Attorney General Eric Schneiderman and San Francisco District Attorney George Gascón and was directed to the CEOs of the major smartphone manufacturers and telecommunication carriers. On 10 June 2013, Apple announced that it would install a "kill switch" on its next iPhone operating system, due to debut in October 2013.

All mobile phones have a unique identifier called IMEI. Anyone can report their phone as lost or stolen with their Telecom Carrier, and the IMEI would be blacklisted with a central registry. Telecom carriers, depending upon local regulation can or must implement blocking of blacklisted phones in their network. There are, however, a number of ways to circumvent a blacklist. One method is to send the phone to a country where the telecom carriers are not required to implement the blacklisting and sell it there, another involves altering the phone's IMEI number. Even so, mobile phones typically have less value on the second-hand market if the phones original IMEI is blacklisted.

=== Conflict minerals ===
Demand for metals used in mobile phones and other electronics fuelled the Second Congo War, which claimed almost 5.5 million lives. In a 2012 news story, The Guardian reported: "In unsafe mines deep underground in eastern Congo, children are working to extract minerals essential for the electronics industry. The profits from the minerals finance the bloodiest conflict since the second world war; the war has lasted nearly 20 years and has recently flared up again. For the last 15 years, the Democratic Republic of the Congo has been a major source of natural resources for the mobile phone industry." The company Fairphone has worked to develop a mobile phone that does not contain conflict minerals.

=== Kosher phones ===
Due to concerns by the Orthodox Jewish rabbinate in Britain that texting by youths could waste time and lead to "immodest" communication, the rabbinate recommended that phones with text-messaging capability not be used by children; to address this, they gave their official approval to a brand of "Kosher" phones with no texting capabilities. Although these phones are intended to prevent immodesty, some vendors report good sales to adults who prefer the simplicity of the devices; other Orthodox Jews question the need for them.

In Israel, similar phones to kosher phones with restricted features exist to observe the sabbath; under Orthodox Judaism, the use of any electrical device is generally prohibited during this time, other than to save lives, or reduce the risk of death or similar needs. Such phones are approved for use by essential workers, such as health, security, and public service workers.

=== Restrictions ===
Restrictions on the use of mobile phones are applied in a number of different contexts, often with the goal of health, safety, security or proper functioning of an establishment, or as a matter of etiquette. Such contexts include:

==== While driving ====
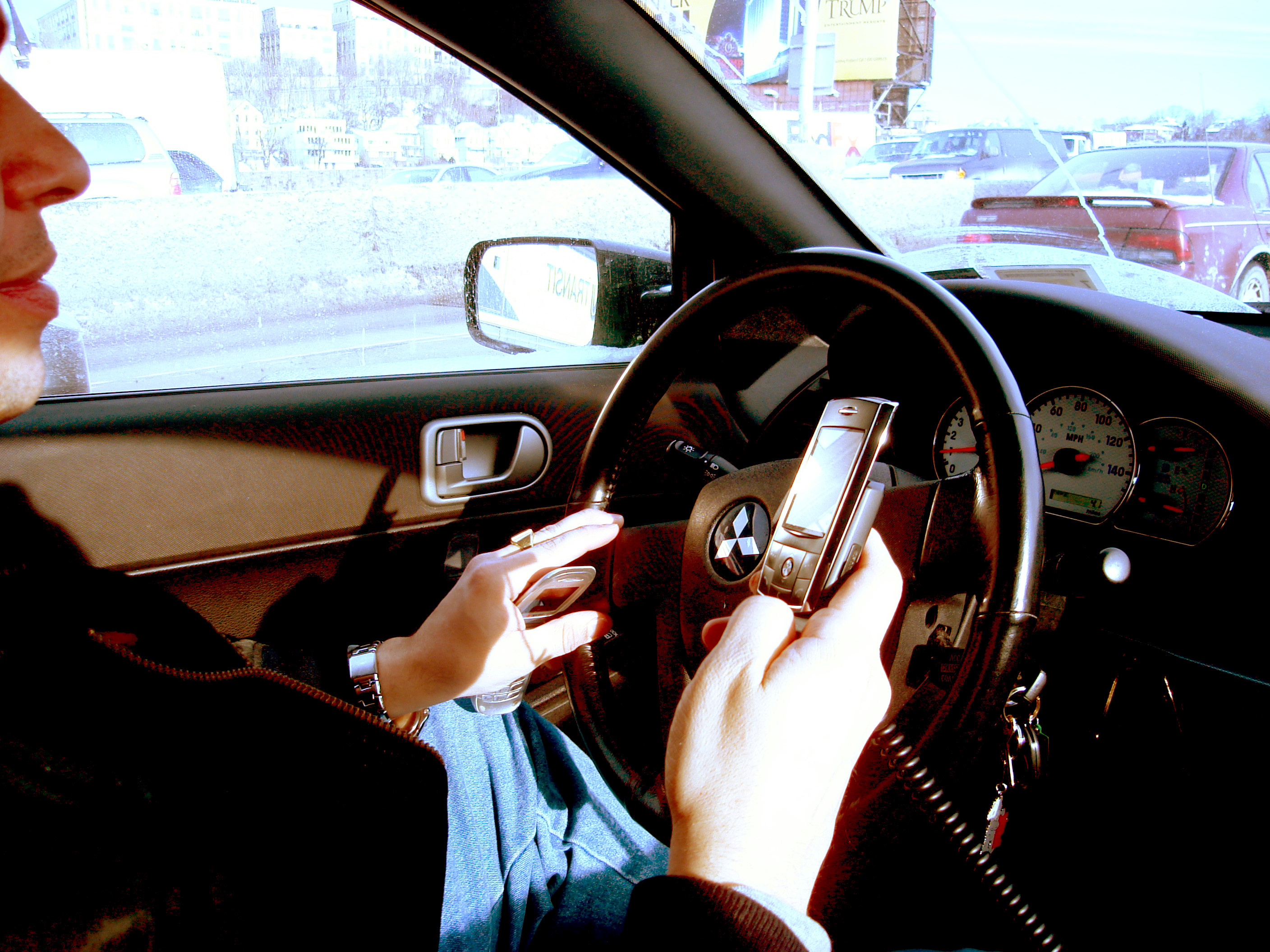
A driver using two handheld mobile phones at once

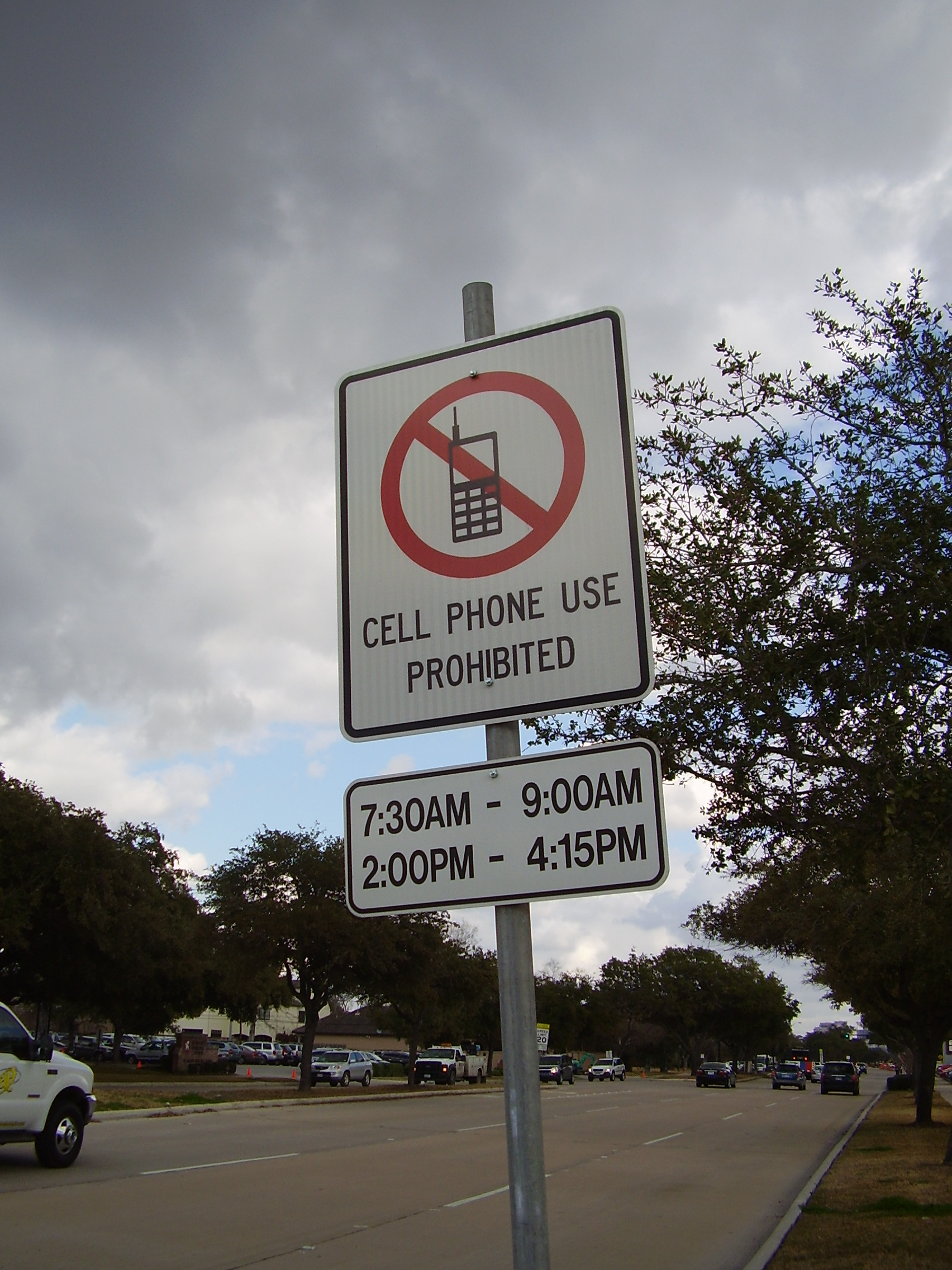
A sign in the US restricting cell phone use to certain times of day (no cell phone use between 7:30–9:00 am and 2:00–4:15 pm)

Mobile phone use while driving, including talking on the phone, texting, or operating other phone features, is common but controversial. It is widely considered dangerous due to distracted driving. Being distracted while operating a motor vehicle has been shown to increase the risk of accidents. In September 2010, the US National Highway Traffic Safety Administration (NHTSA) reported that 995 people were killed by drivers distracted by cell phones. In March 2011, a US insurance company, State Farm Insurance, announced the results of a study which showed 19% of drivers surveyed accessed the Internet on a smartphone while driving. Many jurisdictions prohibit the use of mobile phones while driving. In Egypt, Israel, Japan, Portugal, and Singapore, both handheld and hands-free use of a mobile phone (which uses a speakerphone) is banned. In other countries, including the UK and France and in many US states, only handheld phone use is banned while hands-free use is permitted.

A 2011 study reported that over 90% of college students surveyed text (initiate, reply or read) while driving. The scientific literature on the dangers of driving while sending a text message from a mobile phone, or texting while driving, is limited. A simulation study at the University of Utah found a sixfold increase in distraction-related accidents when texting.

Due to the increasing complexity of mobile phones, they are often more like mobile computers in their available uses. This has introduced additional difficulties for law enforcement officials when attempting to distinguish one usage from another in drivers using their devices. This is more apparent in countries which ban both handheld and hands-free usage, rather than those which ban handheld use only, as officials cannot easily tell which function of the mobile phone is being used simply by looking at the driver. This can lead to drivers being stopped for using their device illegally for a phone call when, in fact, they were using the device legally, for example, when using the phone's incorporated controls for car stereo, GPS or satnav.

A 2010 study reviewed the incidence of mobile phone use while cycling and its effects on behaviour and safety. In 2013, a national survey in the US reported the number of drivers who reported using their cellphones to access the Internet while driving had risen to nearly one of four. A study conducted by the University of Vienna examined approaches for reducing inappropriate and problematic use of mobile phones, such as using mobile phones while driving.

Accidents involving a driver being distracted by talking on a mobile phone have begun to be prosecuted as negligence similar to speeding. In the United Kingdom, from 27 February 2007, motorists who are caught using a hand-held mobile phone while driving will have three penalty points added to their license in addition to the fine of £60. This increase was introduced to try to stem the increase in drivers ignoring the law. Japan prohibits all mobile phone use while driving, including use of hands-free devices. New Zealand has banned hand-held cell phone use since 1 November 2009. Many states in the United States have banned texting on cell phones while driving. Illinois became the 17th American state to enforce this law. As of July 2010, 30 states had banned texting while driving, with Kentucky becoming the most recent addition on 15 July.

Public Health Law Research maintains a list of distracted driving laws in the United States. This database of laws provides a comprehensive view of the provisions of laws that restrict the use of mobile communication devices while driving for all 50 states and the District of Columbia between 1992 when first law was passed, through 1 December 2010. The dataset contains information on 22 dichotomous, continuous or categorical variables including, for example, activities regulated (e.g., texting versus talking, hands-free versus handheld), targeted populations, and exemptions.

==== On aircraft ====
Mobile phone use on aircraft is governed by aviation-safety rules, telecommunications regulations, airline policies, and the technology fitted to an aircraft. Restrictions have been justified by concerns that transmissions from mobile phones and other portable electronic devices may interfere with avionics, and that phones operating at altitude may disrupt terrestrial cellular networks. Evidence concerning interference with aircraft systems has been mixed, and restrictions have also been supported for social reasons, particularly to limit the nuisance of in-flight voice calls.

Onboard systems such as picocells can allow mobile phones to connect at low power to equipment on the aircraft, which relays communications to external networks. Such technology has enabled some airlines to offer in-flight mobile services, including voice calls, while other airlines permit phones only with their transmitters disabled or impose other restrictions.

In the United States, Federal Communications Commission (FCC) regulations prohibit the operation of cellular telephones aboard aircraft while airborne. Federal Aviation Administration (FAA) rules separately govern the use of portable electronic devices on certain aircraft and allow an operator to permit a device if it has determined that the device will not interfere with the aircraft's navigation or communication systems. In Europe, the European Aviation Safety Agency removed its ban on mobile phone use during flights in 2014, allowing airlines to permit portable electronic devices to remain switched on and connected throughout a flight. Rules and airline policies elsewhere vary, with some allowing only airplane mode and others permitting mobile calls under specified conditions.

==== While walking ====
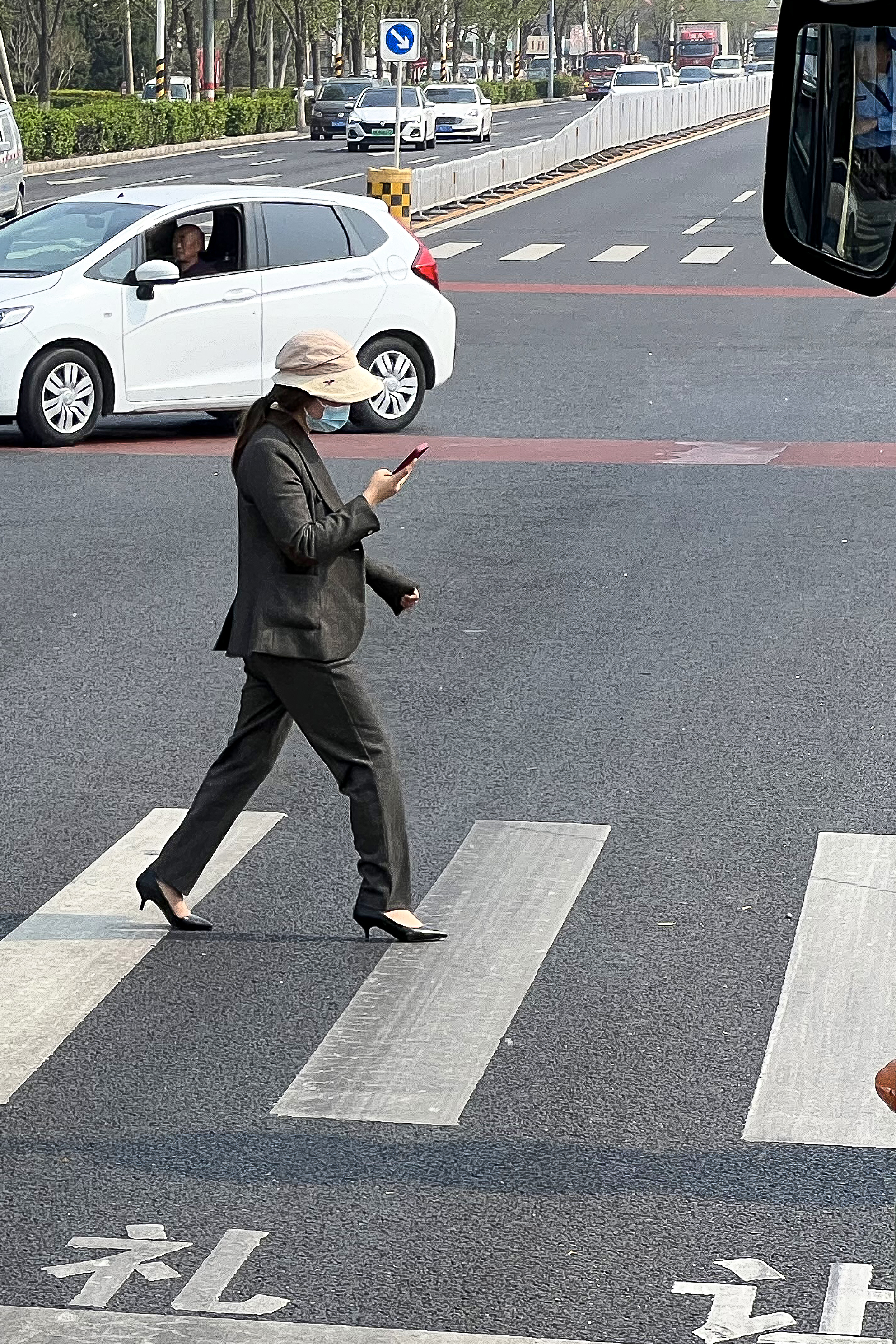
A pedestrian looking down at a smartphone while crossing a road

Between 2011 and 2019, an estimated 30,000 walking injuries occurred in the US related to using a cellphone, leading to some jurisdictions attempting to ban pedestrians from using their cellphones. Other countries, such as China and the Netherlands, have introduced special lanes for smartphone users to help direct and manage them.

==== In prisons ====
In most jurisdictions, prison inmates are forbidden from possessing mobile phones due to their ability to communicate with the outside world and other security issues. Mobile phones are one of the most smuggled items into prisons. They provide inmates the ability to make and receive unauthorized phone calls, send email and text messages, use social media, and follow news pertaining to their case, among other forbidden uses.

==== In hospitals ====
As of 2007, some hospitals had banned mobile devices due to a common misconception that their use would create significant electromagnetic interference.

==== Health effects ====
Screen time, the amount of time using a device with a screen, has become an issue for mobile phones since the adaptation of smartphones. Research is being conducted to show the correlation between screen time and the mental and physical harm in child development. To prevent harm, some parents and even governments have placed restrictions on its usage.

There have been rumors that mobile phone use can cause cancer, but this is a myth.

While there are rumors of mobile phones causing cancer, there was a study conducted by International Agency for Research on Cancer (IARC) that stated the there could be an increase risk of brain tumors with the use of smartphones, this is not confirmed. They also stated that with the lack of data for the research and the usage periods of 15 years will warrant further research for smartphones and the cause of brain tumors.

==== Educational impact ====
A study by the London School of Economics found that banning mobile phones in schools could increase pupils' academic performance, providing benefits equal to one extra week of schooling per year.

== Culture and popularity ==
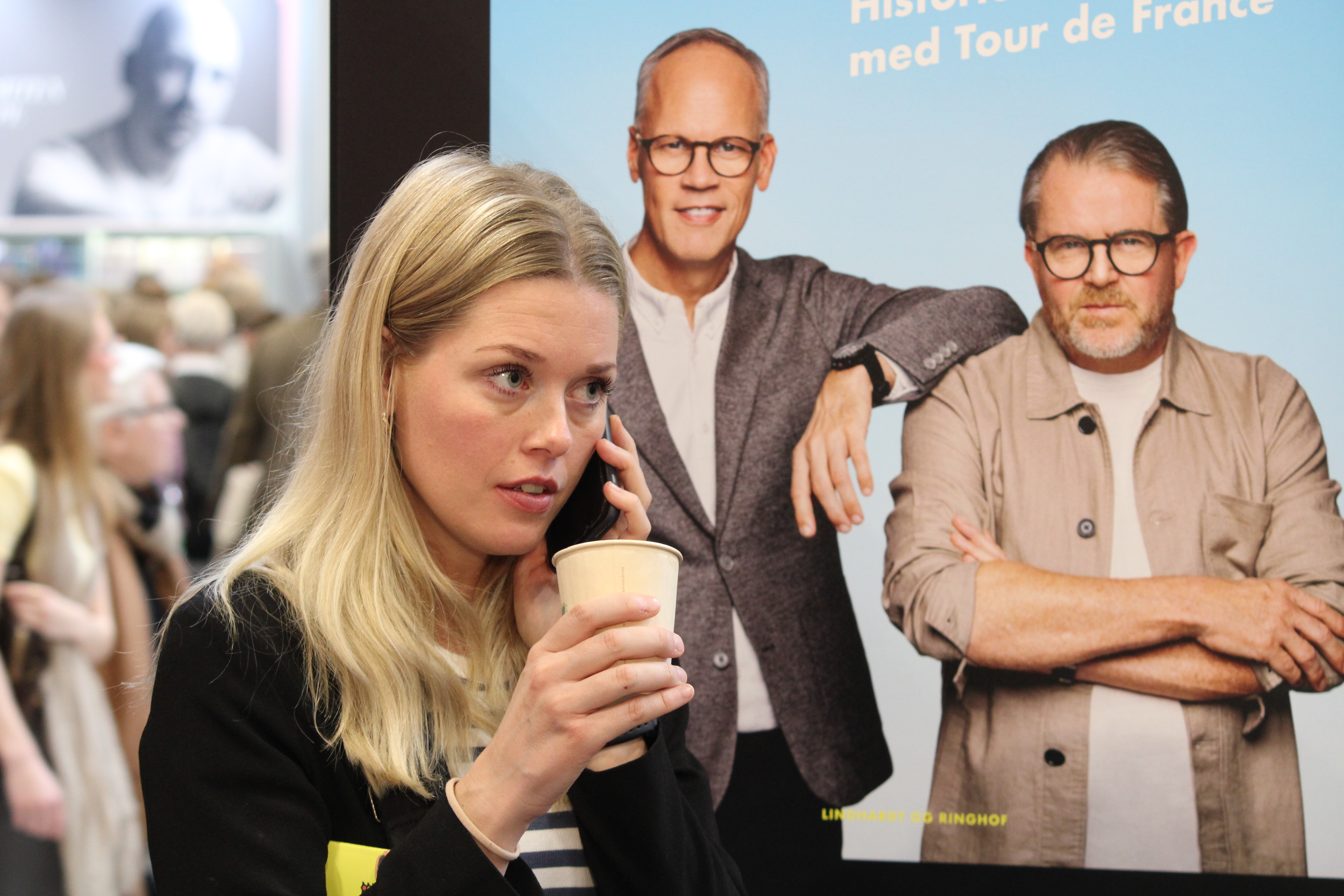
A young woman speaking on a mobile phone in Copenhagen, 2025

Mobile phones are considered an important human invention as it has been one of the most widely used and sold pieces of consumer technology. They have also become culturally symbolic. In Japanese mobile phone culture for example, mobile phones are often decorated with charms. They have also become fashion symbols at times. The Motorola Razr V3 and LG Chocolate are two examples of devices that were popular for being fashionable while not necessarily focusing on the original purpose of mobile phones, i.e. a device to provide mobile telephony.

Some have also suggested that mobile phones or smartphones are a status symbol. For example, a research paper suggested that owning specifically an Apple iPhone was seen to be a status symbol.

Text messaging, which are performed on mobile phones, has also led to the creation of 'SMS language'. It also led to the growing popularity of emojis.

== See also ==
- Camera phone
- Cellular frequencies
- Customer proprietary network information
- Field telephone
- List of countries by number of mobile phones in use
- Mobile broadband
- Mobile phone form factor
- Mobile Internet device (MID)
- Mobile phone accessories
- Mobile Phone Museum
- Mobile phone use in schools
- Mobile phones on aircraft
- Mobile technology
- Mobile telephony
- Optical head-mounted display
- OpenBTS
- Pager
- Personal digital assistant
- Personal Handy-phone System
- Prepaid mobile phone
- Push-button telephone
- Rechargeable battery
- Radiotelephone
- Smombie
- Surveillance
- Tethering
- Two-way radio
  - Professional mobile radio
- VoIP phone
