= List of Android app stores =

The functionality of mobile devices running the Android operating system, the most used mobile operating system globally, can be extended using "apps" – specialized software designed to offer users the means to use their devices for specific additional purposes. Such apps are compiled in the Android-native APK file format which allows easy redistribution of apps to end-users.

Most apps are distributed through Google's Play Store but many alternative software repositories, or app stores, exist. Alternative app stores use Android devices' "Unknown Sources" option to install APK files directly via the Android Package Manager.

== Google Play Store ==
The Google Play Store (originally the Android Market), operated and developed by Google, serves as the official app store for Android, allowing users to download apps developed with the Android software development kit (SDK) and published through Google. The store offers both free and paid apps. Apps exploiting the hardware capabilities of a device can be targeted to users of devices with specific hardware components, such as a motion sensor (for motion-dependent games) or a front-facing camera (for online video calling). The Google Play store had over 50 billion app downloads in 2013 and has reached over 2.96 million apps published in 2020.

Although bundled with most Android devices, the Play Store is only available on devices that are certified within the "Android Compatibility Program". As a result, manufacturers of so-called custom ROMs, i.e., modified versions of Android, are not allowed to bundle Google apps, including the Play Store, with their software. Compatibility can be restored by installing the Google apps from another source, such as OpenGApps, or using alternative app stores.

== Manufacturer app stores ==
In addition to some manufacturers not creating certified compatible versions of Android, some have also chosen to bundle their own app stores—either alongside the Play Store or as a replacement.

Such app stores include:

- Amazon Appstore, which is installed instead of the Play Store on Amazon's Fire Phone and Kindle Fire. This was the default way to install Android apps on Windows 11 (Note: Windows Subsystem for Android and the Amazon Appstore are no longer available in the Microsoft Store after March 5, 2025). Amazon Appstore for Android was discontinued on August 20, 2025.
- Honor App Market
- Huawei AppGallery, which is installed on Huawei mobile devices. After the Google Mobile Services ban, AppGallery is the sole app distribution on Huawei's phones. The APK can be downloaded by the Huawei site and installed as a known origin source.
- Oppo App Market
- Samsung Galaxy Store, which is installed on Samsung mobile devices alongside the Play Store.
- VIVO App Store
- Xiaomi Mi GetApps

== Third-party app stores ==
App stores that do not rely on pre-installation by the manufacturer are an alternate option for finding Android applications. Apps offered through third-party app stores or websites, created by parties not affiliated with the device or operating system (OS), are also third-party apps.

Notable stores include:

- Accrescent - a free and open source software store focused on security. In April 2024 it was still in alpha.
- Aptoide
- Cafe Bazaar - an Android app store in Iran that launched in January 2011.
- Myket - an Android app store in Iran that launched in June 2011.
- F-Droid - a free software store focused on free software and privacy.
- TapTap
- ZapStore - an OSS software store that uses the Nostr protocol.

This form of the app store is often used by web developers to distribute apps that are not allowed in the Google Play Store; this may be due to an app allowing users wider access to the app system, or offering apps for "niche users" who choose to use only free and open-source software (F-Droid) or prefer to play indie games (itch.io). Moreover, there are alternative stores that serve to distribute "hacked" versions of paid apps, for no cost.

== Proxy app store ==
There are also proxy app stores that act as a client for the Google Play store.

- Aurora Store
- Softpedia

== See also ==
- List of mobile app distribution platforms
