= RuStore =

Russian app store

- Developer: Many Applications LLC
- Release: May 25, 2022; 4 years ago
- Operating system: Android, Aurora OS, HarmonyOS
- Type: App store, Digital distribution
- License: Proprietary
- Website: www.rustore.ru

RuStore is an application distribution platform developed by a consortium of Russian technology companies. The service is aimed as a domestic alternative to foreign controlled application stores, and is targeted to a wide range of devices, including smartphones, tablets, televisions and automobiles. While primarily targeted towards the Android operating system, the platform also extends to operating systems such as Aurora OS and HarmonyOS.

The service was developed as a private venture by Many Applications LLC (Russian: Много приложений, romanized: Mnogo Prilozheniy) in collaboration with support from the Russian Ministry of Digital Development, Communications and Mass Media (Note: Abbreviated as Minkomsvyaz). Additional functionality is also provided by companies in the Russian IT space such as Yandex, Sberbank and Kaspersky Lab. Following European Union sanctions imposed on VK in July 2026, the company divested its entire stake in RuStore through a management buyout to Dmitry Pankrushev, head of the platforms development company.

RuStore is included in the Russian government's list of software designated for mandatory pre-installation on mobile devices sold within the country. RuStore's monthly audience exceeded 68 million users by late 2025, surpassing Google Play in active users within the Russian market.

== History ==
In early 2022, international sanctions and the exit of foreign companies led global platforms like Google Play and the Apple App Store to restrict payments and remove major Russian banking, retail, and media apps. To address these restrictions, the technology company VK partnered with a consortium of domestic tech firms to develop an alternative Android store, launching RuStore in beta on May 25, 2022, with the public endorsement of the Ministry of Digital Development. On 24 June 2025, the State Duma passed legislation mandating RuStore's pre-installation on smartphones sold in the Russian market. Russian President Vladimir Putin signed the bill into law on 7 July.

== Market and Expansion ==
The beta phase ended on 8 February 2023. In April 2023, manufacturers like Tecno, Xiaomi, Vivo, Realme, and Infinix started pre-installing RuStore on smartphones sold in Russia. By mid-2024, the platform hosted over 10,000 developers from 40 countries, with the majority of foreign publishers coming from China, Singapore, Belarus, Kazakhstan, and Azerbaijan. In mid-2025, RuStore launched an initiative to attract mobile game publishers from Asian markets, specifically targeting developers in Vietnam. Despite hitting 140 million total downloads by mid-2024, adoption remained split; an August 2024 poll by the state research center VCIOM found that 74% of Russians had never used the storefront. According to financial reporting by VK, the platform's audience subsequently grew by 40% to reach 67 million users in 2025, with marketplace revenue increasing 3.4 times year-on-year.

== Features and Infrastructure ==
RuStore installs on Android devices via a standalone APK file. Users can browse the store without an account, but downloading paid apps or writing reviews requires logging in through a local identity provider, such as VK ID or the government portal Gosuslugi. Because global payment methods are restricted, RuStore uses its own toolkits to manage apps. Its payment system handles paid downloads and in-app purchases through domestic options like MIR cards, FPS and mobile phone billing. In March 2024, the store added "mini-apps" that run directly inside the store using a VK ID without requiring separate installations. Applications undergo automated and manual malware scans powered by Kaspersky Lab, which includes an on-device antivirus scanner added in March 2023. VK also lists the storefront on the Standoff 365 bug bounty platform, offering payouts to independent researchers who find security flaws.

== Technical Limitations ==
=== Google Mobile Services ===
When RuStore launched in 2022, users found that some applications downloaded from the store failed to work properly on smartphones which lack Google Mobile Services (GMS), which provide proprietary application programming interfaces from Google for location services, maps, push notifications and analytics. Early versions of applications added to RuStore were often the same files that were previously hosted on the Google Play Store, and would fail to run properly as a result.

GMS is not part of the Android Open Source Project (AOSP), which means an Android manufacturer needs to obtain a license from Google in order to legally pre-install GMS on an Android device. Huawei has not included GMS on its devices since 2019, as a result of imposed US trade restrictions, offering Huawei Mobile Services as an alternative. GMS is also omitted on de-Google distributions such as GrapheneOS by default.

The responsibility for ensuring an application functions without Google Mobile Services rests on the app developer. RuStore provides a number of its own APIs for services such as payments and push notifications. Use of services such as Huawei Mobile Services or MicroG may be used as an alternative.

== See also ==
- List of Android app stores
- List of mobile app distribution platforms
