= Zynn =

Chinese short video app

- Developer: Owlii (acquired by Kuaishou)
- Initial release: 7 May 2020; 5 years ago
- Stable release: 1.0.3 / 4 June 2020
- Operating system: iOS, Android
- Size: 176 MB (iOS)
- Type: Video sharing
- License: Proprietary software with Terms of Use
- Website: zynnvideo.com

Zynn was a Chinese video-sharing social networking service owned by Kuaishou, a Beijing-based internet technology company established in 2011 by Su Hua and Cheng Yixiao. It was used to create and share short videos, and it pays its users for using the app and referring others. Zynn was launched on May 7, 2020. It became the most-downloaded app in the App Store in the same month. It has also been criticized for being a "pyramid scheme", and it has faced accusations of plagiarism and stealing content. Aside from Zynn in North America, Kuaishou is available under the name Kwai in Russia, South Korea, Japan, Thailand, Vietnam, Philippines, Malaysia, Indonesia, Brazil, America, India, and the Middle East. Kwai used to be available in Australia and the United States on the App Store, but was removed at an unknown date. Zynn was permanently shut down on the 20th of August, 2021.

== History ==
In 2011, entrepreneur Su Hua co-founded Kuaishou with business partner Cheng Yixiao. Originally a GIF-making app, Kuaishou soon moved to short video content. Su Hua also serves as the current Kuaishou CEO.

In December 2019, Chinese internet conglomerate Tencent invested $2 billion in Kuaishou, reportedly to compete with rival ByteDance. In December 2019, Kuaishou acquired an app developer called Owlii, which is the developer of Zynn. Zynn was developed to be a North American Market edition of Kuaishou.

On May 7, 2020, the app was launched and it was downloaded over 2 million times in that month. On May 12, 2020, Kuaishou filed a lawsuit seeking compensation for "unfair competition", and accused Douyin, the sister app of TikTok, of "interfering" with search results on app stores.

Zynn shut down on the 20th of August, 2021.

== Features ==
Zynn allows its users to create, edit and share short videos of themselves. Its interface has been described as a "complete clone" of TikTok, its main competitor.

The Zynn app was unique in the way that they paid users for using the platform. Each user earned $1 for signing up, and they could earn money for referring users to the platform. Watching videos resulted in earning "points", which could be redeemed for gift cards or be cashed out via PayPal.

== Criticisms and controversies ==
Multiple TikTok users had reported seeing their entire accounts plagiarized, with one account pretending to be Addison Rae. Despite being launched in May, many videos were posted in February. Zynn has employed "intermittent variable rewards" in its point system, which has been criticized as being the "same reinforcement strategy used to addict people to slot machines". Cash payouts for using the app have resulted in criticism and accusations of anti-competitive behavior.

The app was taken down from the Google Play store on June 10. Zynn blamed it on an "isolated incident". Six days later, it was taken down from the App Store as well.

US Senator Josh Hawley has criticized the platform, calling it "predatory" and "anti-competitive" in a letter to the Federal Trade Commission asking for an investigation into Zynn. He said "[Zynn] smacks of a textbook predatory-pricing scheme, one calculated to attain immediate market dominance for Zynn by driving competitors out of the market."

== Notes ==
1. Paying users to use an app is commonplace in China, particularly in smaller cities or towns where residents have lower income. It is seen in other apps such as Pinduoduo, Qutoutiao, and Weibo's Oasis.

== See also ==
- Kuaishou
