= Zyn (disambiguation) =

Zyn is a brand of nicotine pouches produced by Swedish Match.

Zyn or ZYN may also refer to:

- Zyn, a line of cymbals manufactured by Premier Percussion
- ZynAddSubFX or Zyn-Fusion, an open-source software synthesizer
- Nîmes station, France, IATA code

== See also ==
- Zynn, a defunct Chinese video-sharing service
