= Eric Tan =

- Born: Tan Siliang
- Education: Tsinghua University; University of Chinese Academy of Sciences
- Known for: Chairman and co-founder, Qutoutiao

Tan Siliang (Chinese: 谭思亮), also known as Eric Tan, is a Chinese billionaire businessman, the chairman and co-founder of Qutoutiao, a mobile content aggregator.

== Early life ==
Tan earned a bachelor of engineering degree in automation from Tsinghua University in 2002, and a master of engineering degree in artificial intelligence from the University of Chinese Academy of Sciences in 2006.

== Career ==
Tan worked for Yahoo China as a senior engineer.

Qutoutiao was founded in 2016, and is based in Shanghai. In September 2018, following Qutoutiao's IPO, Tan's net worth was estimated at US$1.7 billion.
