= App store =

Platform for distributing application software

An app store, also called an app marketplace or app catalog, is a type of digital distribution platform for computer software called applications, often in a mobile context. Apps provide a specific set of functions which, by definition, do not include the running of the computer itself. Complex software developed for personal computers may have a corresponding mobile app optimized for the device’s constraints. Today apps are normally designed to run on a specific mobile operating system—such as the contemporary iOS, iPadOS, Windows Phone, or Android—but in the past mobile carriers had their own portals for apps and related media content.

An app store can be thought as a restricted, commercial version of a package manager, although an app store provides additional services like app discovery, user reviews, security screening, licensing enforcement, and seamless integration of a payment system. Unlike traditional package managers, which prioritize dependency management and system integration, app stores focus on usability, monetization, and a curated user experience.

== Basic concept ==
An app store is any digital storefront intended to allow search and review of software titles or other media offered for sale electronically. Critically, the application storefront itself provides a secure, uniform experience that automates the electronic purchase, decryption and installation of software applications or other digital media.

App stores typically organise the apps they offer based on: the function(s) provided by the app (including games, multimedia or productivity), the device for which the app was designed, and the operating system on which the app will run.

App stores typically take the form of an online store, where users can browse through these different app categories, view information about each app (such as reviews or ratings), and acquire the app (including app purchase, if necessary – many apps are offered at no cost). The selected app is offered as an automatic download, after which the app installs. Some app stores may also include a system to automatically remove an installed program from devices under certain conditions, with the goal of protecting the user against malicious software.

App stores typically provide a way for users to give reviews and ratings. Those reviews are useful for other users, for developers and for app store owners. Users can select the best apps based on ratings, developers get feedback on what features are praised or disliked, and finally, app store owners can detect bad apps and malicious developers by automatically analyzing the reviews with data mining techniques.

Many app stores are curated by their owners, requiring that submissions of prospective apps go through an approval process. These apps are inspected for compliance with certain guidelines (such as those for quality control and censorship), including the requirement that a commission be collected on each sale of a paid app. Some app stores provide feedback to developers: number of installations, issues in the field (latency, crash, etc.).

== History ==
=== Precursors ===
Commercial Bulletin board services appeared in the early 1980s, such as Micronet 800 (1983), that permitted registered subscribers to browse, purchase, and download software for a variety of proprietary operating systems, then offered by manufacturers such as Acorn, Apple, Commodore, Dragon, IBM, RML, Sinclair and Tandy. Some programs being included in the monthly subscription charge, the user only paying the per minute connection / data charges for a download, while other programs resulted in the user being additionally billed per purchase.

The Electronic AppWrapper was the first commercial electronic software distribution catalog to collectively manage encryption and provide digital rights for apps and digital media (issue #3 was the app store originally demonstrated to Steve Jobs at NeXTWorld EXPO). While a Senior Editor at NeXTWORLD Magazine, Simson Garfinkel, rated The Electronic AppWrapper 4 3/4 Cubes (out of 5), in his formal review. Paget's Electronic AppWrapper was named a finalist in the highly competitive InVision Multimedia '93 awards in January 1993 and won the Best of Breed award for Content and Information at NeXTWORLD Expo in May 1993.

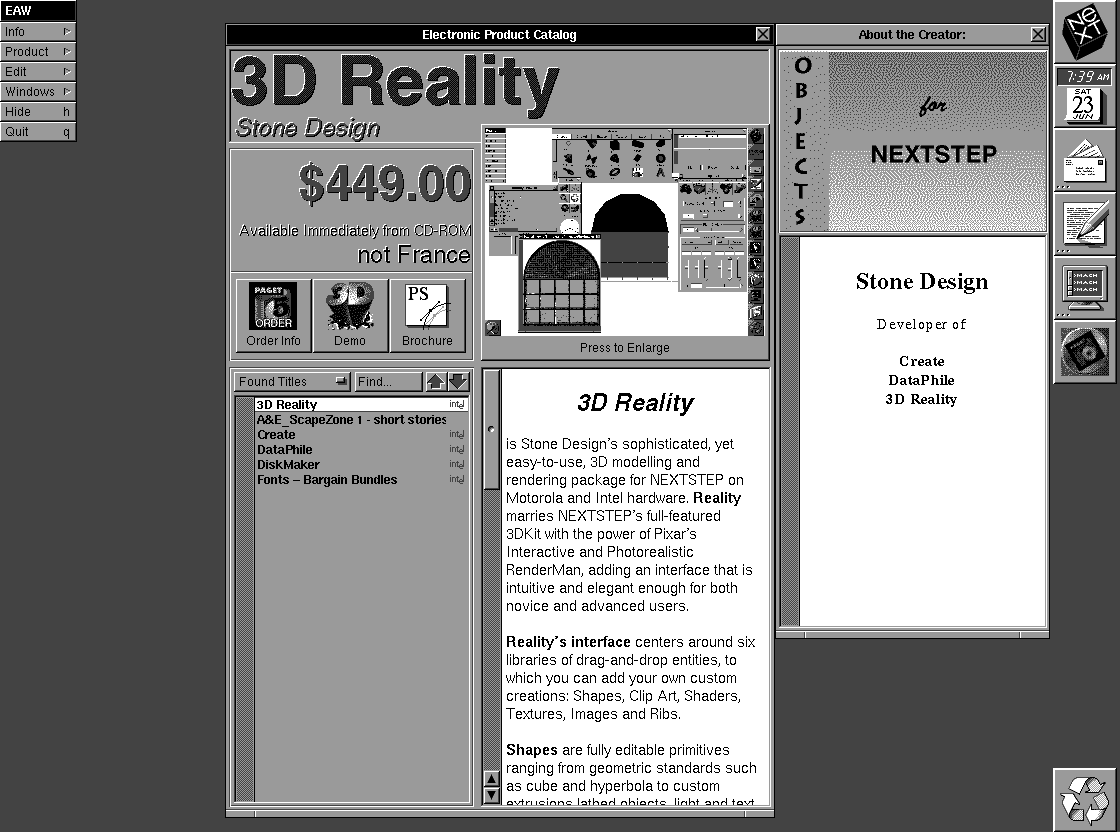
A screenshot of Stone Design's 3DReality running on the Electronic AppWrapper, the first app store

Prior to the Electronic AppWrapper, which first shipped in 1992, people were used to software distributed via floppy disks or CD-ROMs, one could even download software using a web browser or command-line tools.

Many Linux distributions and other Unix-like systems provide a tool known as a package manager. Package managers lack the financial transactions, and are not restricted to app-level software. A package manager allows a user to automatically manage the software installed on their systems, including both operating system components and third-party software. This is often done using command line tools, but some package managers have graphical front-end software which can be used to browse available packages and perform operations, such as Synaptic (which is often used as a front-end for APT). New software (and the other packages required for its proper operation, called dependencies) can be retrieved from local or remote mirrors, and automatically installed, in a single process.

Package managers predate appstores. In the mid-1990s, package managers developed automated dependency resolution and updates; they already kept track of program files and cleanly uninstalled packages. Some app stores have also developed these features.

Package managers are used by most FOSS operating systems, for all of their software packages, not just application-level ones. Notable package managers in Unix-like operating systems have included FreeBSD Ports (1994), pkgsrc (1997), Debian's APT (1998), YUM, and Gentoo's Portage (which unlike most package managers, distributes packages containing source code that is automatically compiled instead of executables).

In 1996, the SUSE Linux distribution has YaST as frontend for its own software packages. Mandriva Linux has urpmi with GUI frontend called Rpmdrake. Fedora Linux and Red Hat Enterprise Linux has YUM in 2003 as a successor of YUP (developed at Duke University for Red Hat Linux).

In 1997, BeDepot a third-party app store and package manager (Software Valet) for BeOS was launched, which operated until 2001. It was eventually acquired by Be Inc. BeDepot allowed for both commercial and free apps as well as handling updates

In 1998, Information Technologies India Ltd (ITIL) launched Palmix, a web based app store exclusively for mobile and handheld devices. Palmix sold apps for the three major PDA platforms of the time: the Palm OS based Palm Pilots, Windows CE based devices, and Psion Epoc handhelds.

In 1999, NTT DoCoMo launched i-mode, the first integrated online app store for mobile phones, gaining nationwide popularity in Japanese mobile phone culture. DoCoMo used a revenue-sharing business model, allowing content creators and app providers to keep up to 91% of revenue. Other operators outside Japan also made their own portals after this, such as Vodafone live! in 2002. At this time mobile phone manufacturer Nokia also introduced carrier-free downloadable content with Club Nokia.

In December 2001, Sprint PCS launched the Ringers & More Wireless Download Service for their then-new 3G wireless network. This allowed subscribers to the Sprint PCS mobile phone network to download ringtones, wallpaper, J2ME applications and later full music tracks to certain phones. The user interface worked through a web browser on the desktop computer, and a version was available through the handset.

In 2002, the commercial Linux distribution Linspire (then known as LindowsOS—which was founded by Michael Robertson, founder of MP3.com) introduced an app store known as Click'N'Run (CNR). For an annual subscription fee, users could perform one-click installation of free and paid apps through the CNR software. Doc Searls believed that the ease-of-use of CNR could help make desktop Linux a feasible reality.

=== Smartphone app stores ===
In September 2003, Danger Inc. released an over-the-air update for T-Mobile Sidekick devices which included a new catalog application called Download Fun, also known as the Catalog or Premium Download Manager(PDM). This was one of the first modern app stores on a smartphone with a framework similar to what we see today with the other App Stores. The Download Fun catalog allowed users to download ringtones and applications directly to their device and be billed through their wireless carrier. Third party developers could develop native Java based applications using Danger's free SDK and submit them for distribution in the Catalog.

In October 2003, Handango introduced an on-device app store for finding, installing and buying software for Sony Ericsson P800 and P900 devices. App download and purchasing are completed directly on the device so sync with a computer is not necessary. Description, rating and screenshot are available for any app.

In 2006, Nokia introduced Nokia Catalogs, later known as Nokia Download!, for Symbian smartphones which had access to downloadable apps—originally via third-parties like Handango or Jamba! but from mid-2006 Nokia were offering their own content via the Nokia Content Discoverer.

Apple released iPhone OS 2.0 in July 2008 for the iPhone, together with the App Store, officially introducing third-party app development and distribution to the platform. The service allows users to purchase and download new apps for their device through either the App Store on the device, or through the iTunes Store on the iTunes desktop software. While Apple has been criticised by some for how it operates the App Store, it has been a major financial success for the company. The popularity of Apple's App Store led to the rise of the generic term "app store", as well as the introduction of equivalent marketplaces by competing mobile operating systems: the Android Market (later renamed to Google Play) launched alongside the release of the first Android smartphone (the HTC Dream) in September 2008, BlackBerry's App World launched in April 2009, as well as Nokia's Ovi Store, Microsoft's Windows Marketplace for Mobile, Palm's App Catalog and Samsung's Samsung Apps all launching that year.

=== Modern desktop app stores ===
The popular Linux distribution Ubuntu (also based on Debian) introduced its own graphical software manager known as the Ubuntu Software Center on version 9.10 as a replacement for Synaptic. On Ubuntu 10.10, released in October 2010, the Software Center expanded beyond only offering existing software from its repositories by adding the ability to purchase certain apps (which, at launch, was limited to Fluendo's licensed DVD codecs). App stores are integrated into MacOS with the Mac App Store and Microsoft Windows with the Microsoft Store.

== "App Store" trademark ==
Due to its popularity, the term "app store" (first used by the Electronic AppWrapper and later popularised by Apple's App Store for iOS devices) has frequently been used as a generic trademark to refer to other distribution platforms of a similar nature. Apple asserted trademark claims over the phrase, and filed a trademark registration for "App Store" in 2008. In 2011, Apple sued both Amazon.com (which runs the Amazon Appstore for Android-based devices) and GetJar (who has offered its services since 2004) for trademark infringement and false advertising regarding the use of the term "app store" to refer to their services. Microsoft filed multiple objections against Apple's attempt to register the name as a trademark, considering it to already be a generic term.

In January 2013, a United States district court rejected Apple's trademark claims against Amazon. The judge ruled that Apple had presented no evidence that Amazon had attempted "to mimic Apple's site or advertising" or communicated that its service "possesses the characteristics and qualities that the public has come to expect from the Apple APP STORE and/or Apple products". In July 2013, Apple dropped its case.

== See also ==
- Software repository
- E-commerce
- Digital distribution of video games
- Comparison of mobile operating systems
- App store optimization
- List of Android app stores
- List of mobile app distribution platforms
  - App Store (Apple), iOS app approvals
  - Cydia
  - Google Play
  - Amazon Appstore
  - Aptoide
  - Cafe Bazaar
  - F-Droid
  - Galaxy Store
  - GetJar
  - Huawei AppGallery
  - Itch.io
  - Opera Mobile Store
  - MiKandi
  - XDA Labs
  - Microsoft Store
- Desktop software distribution platforms
  - AppStream
  - Chrome Web Store
  - GNOME Software
  - Mac App Store, Apple TV App Store
  - Microsoft Store
  - Setapp
  - Steam
  - Synaptic
