= List of mobile app distribution platforms =

This list of mobile app distribution platforms includes digital distribution platforms, or marketplace 'app stores', intended to provide mobile applications, aka 'apps' to mobile devices. For information on each mobile platform and its market share, see the mobile operating system and smartphone articles. A comparison of the development capabilities of each mobile platform can be found in the article on mobile app development. For cross-platform development, see the mobile development framework. The mobile app article contains other general information.

== Mobile app platforms ==
=== Native platforms ===
These application marketplaces, or 'm' are native to the major mobile operating systems. Anyway, the relative store APK can often be installed in other compatible systems without rooting a device, as it happens for Huawei AppGallery and stock Android.

There are 17 native mobile app distribution platforms currently on this list.

app store name	date established	status	owner	available apps	download count	installed base	device platform	allows individual developers to publish	cut for developer per sale	developer fees (per year)	development tools (SDK)	free of charge IDE?
Amazon Appstore for Android	22 Mar 2011	closed	Amazon.com, Inc.	591,818 (2025 estimate)	unknown	unknown	Android OS (customised), Android, BlackBerry 10	yes	70%	free (previously: US$90)	Amazon; Mobile; App SDK	yes
Apple App Store (iOS / iPadOS)	10 Jul 2008	live	Apple Inc.	1,640,000 (approx., 2025)	unknown	unknown	iOS iPadOS	yes	60–70%	US$99	iOS SDK, Xcode	yes
BlackBerry World	1 Apr 2009	closed	BlackBerry; Limited	223,601 (26 Oct 2013)	3 billion (May 2012)	75 million (Jan 2012)	BlackBerry OS, BlackBerry Tablet OS, BlackBerry 10 OS	closed for new app submission	70%	free	BlackBerry 10 native SDK (with full POSIX and Qt support), HTML5 Qt4 SDK, Android (via BlackBerry Android Tools SDK), Adobe AIR SDK, BlackBerry OS SDK	yes
Download Fun / Catalog	20 Sep 2003	closed	Danger, Inc. / Microsoft	unknown	unknown	unknown	Danger OS	yes	40%	free	Danger OS SDK	yes
Firefox Marketplace	6 Sep 2013	closed	Mozilla; Foundation	5,957 (Mar 2014)	unknown	unknown	Firefox OS	yes	70%	unknown	unknown	yes
Google Play (formerly Android Market)	22 Oct 2008	live	Google, LLC	1,800,000 (approx., Apr–May 2025; post-purge)	50 billion (historical: Jul 2013)	over 2 billion (historical: May 2017)	Android	yes	70%	One-time registration fee: US$25	Android SDK, Android Studio	yes
HP App Catalog	6 Jun 2009	closed	Palm, Inc. / Hewlett-Packard	10,002 (Dec 2011)	108 million (Aug 2011)	2.6 million (Jul 2010)	webOS	yes	70%	free	Enyo	yes
Huawei AppGallery	2011	live	Huawei; Technologies; Co., Ltd.	300,000 (HarmonyOS apps; reported November 2025)	432 billion (Q4 2022 - historical downloads figure)	1 billion (Huawei ecosystem / device numbers reported by Huawei; see notes)	HarmonyOS, (formerly) Android, Huawei EMUI	yes	100% for first 2 years, then 70%-90% flexible	free	HarmonyOS SDK, DevEco Studio, (formerly) Android SDK, HMS Core, HMS Toolkit	yes (Huawei Quick App IDE and DevEco Studio).
Microsoft Store (formerly Windows Store)	26 Oct 2012	live	Microsoft; Corp.	669,000 (historical figure, 2015) (reported Sep 2015)	no recent public total (no authoritative global app-count published since 2015)	410 million (historical figure for Windows PC device base — Sep 2015 estimate)	Windows 8, Windows RT, Windows 8.1, Windows 10, Windows 11, Windows 10 Mobile, Windows Phone	yes	70% - raised to 80% if developer sales exceeds US$25,000 in a year	individuals: US$19, or free for student; companies: US$99. One registration fee for both Windows Phone Store and Windows Store (historical).	Visual Studio (various versions), Windows App Studio (historical)	yes
Nokia Download!	2006	replaced with the Ovi Store	Nokia; Oyj	unknown	unknown	unknown	Symbian (S60), Series 40	unknown	unknown	unknown	unknown	
Nokia Store (formerly Ovi Store)	26 May 2009	closed, replaced with the Opera Mobile Store	Nokia; Oyj	120,000 (Aug 2012)	17 million/day (Oct 2012)	~885 million	multiple Symbian, MeeGo, Maemo, S40, Nokia X software platform	yes	70%	€1	Qt 4 SDK, Nokia Web Tools, Nokia SDK for Java	yes
OpenStore for Ubuntu Touch	Sep 2014	live	UBports (a democracy)	many most Linux software applications will run on Ubuntu Touch	unknown	unknown	open-source mobile phones	yes (anything packaged in the Ubuntu package database should run)	—N/a	free	Linux	yes
PureOS Software Center	Nov 2017 ?	live	Purism supported by The Debian Project (a democracy)	quite many most Linux software applications will run on PureOS	unknown	unknown	open-source mobile phones	yes (anything packaged in the Debian package database should run)	0	free	Linux	yes
Samsung Galaxy Store (formerly Samsung Galaxy Apps)	Sep 2009	live	Samsung; Electronics	unknown	unknown	over 1 billion (Oct 2020 - device / service related metric)	Android, Tizen, Windows; Mobile, Bada	unknown	unknown	unknown	unknown	
Snap Store	9 Dec 2014	live	Canonical; Limited	unknown	unknown	unknown	Linux distributions	yes	—N/a	free	Snapcraft	unknown
Ubuntu Software Centre aka Ubuntu App Store	17 Oct 2013	closed, replaced by Snap Store	Canonical; Limited	2,650+ (Dec 2015, incl. web apps & scopes)	unknown	unknown	Ubuntu Touch	yes	—N/a	free	Ubuntu SDK	yes
Windows Phone Store (formerly Windows Phone Marketplace)	21 Oct 2010	closed, merged with the Windows Store	Microsoft; Corp.	400,000+ (Mar 2015)	9 billion (Mar 2015)	100 million (Jun 2015)	Windows Phone	yes	70%	individuals: US$19, or free for student; companies: US$99 / unlimited paid apps, and 100 free apps submissions.	Windows Phone Developer Tools, includes specialty versions of Microsoft Visual Studio, Expression Blend	yes
	date established	status	owner	available apps	download count	installed base	device platform	allows individual developers to publish	cut for developer per sale	developer fees (per year)	development tools (SDK)	free of charge IDE?

Notes

- Google Play — App figures reported by app intelligence firms in 2025 indicate a substantial reduction in listed Play Store apps (from ~3.4M at the start of 2024 to ~1.8M in 2025) following tightened policy enforcement and purges. For details see TechCrunch / The Verge coverage.
- Huawei AppGallery — commonly reported HMS / AppGallery figures (220k+ HMS apps; ~580M MAU) are from Huawei / industry reporting in 2022; Huawei's HarmonyOS native app totals (HarmonyOS NEXT) and developer counts have been advanced in Huawei's 2024–2025 messaging (see Harmony Developers report).

=== Third-party platforms ===
Third-party platforms are software distribution platforms which are used as alternatives to operating system native distribution platforms. Independent operating systems are software collections that use their own software distribution, customised user interface (UI), software development kit (SDK) and application programming interface (API) (except billing API which is related only to the application store).

There are 18 third-party mobile app distribution platforms currently on this list.

app store platform name	date established	status	owner	available apps	download count	install base	device platform	cut for developer per sale	developer fees (per year)	developer console	development platform(s) (SDK)
Appcircle App Distribution	2021	live	Appcircle Inc	unknown	unknown	unknown	Android and iOS	0	free	Yes	—N/a
Appland	2011	live	Appland	130,000	25 million (Mar 2016)	5 million (Mar 2016)	Android and iOS	up to 70%	free	unknown	unknown
Applivery App Distribution	Feb 2017	live	Applivery; Mobility Management	2,000,000+ (Dec 2020)	unknown	unknown	Android and iOS	0	free	Yes	Android SDK, iOS SDK
Aptoide	17 Nov 2009	live	Aptoide	1,100,000 (Oct 2020)	17.5 billion (Oct 2020)	120 million (Oct 2020)	Android, iOS	up to 75%	free	unknown	Android SDK, Java ME
Cafe Bazaar	Apr 2011	live	Hezardastan Technologies	160,000 (May 2019)	unknown	40 million (May 2019)	Android	up to 70%	free	unknown	unknown
Cydia	Feb 2008	live	saurik	unknown	unknown	30 million	iOS	—N/a	free	unknown	iOS SDK, Xcode
F-Droid	29 Sep 2010	live	F-Droid; Limited	4,002	248 million (Mar 2015)	unknown	Android	—N/a	free	unknown	Android SDK
GetJar	2004	live	GetJar, Accel; Partners	849,036 (Mar 2015)	3 billion (Mar 2015)	200 million users	multiple Android, BlackBerry OS, Flash Lite, Java, iOS, Palm OS, Symbian, Windows Phone	—N/a	free	unknown	unknown
Handango	2000	closed	PocketGear	190,000 (MMM 20YY)	unknown	unknown	multiple Android, BlackBerry OS, Palm OS, PSP, Symbian, Windows Mobile	≈42%	free	—N/a	unknown
Handmark	2000	closed	Handmark	unknown	unknown	unknown	multiple Android, BlackBerry OS, iOS, Java, Palm OS, Symbian, Windows Mobile	unknown	unknown	unknown	unknown
MiKandi	29 Nov 2009	closed	MiKandi	unknown	unknown	80000 (Dec 2009)	Android	unknown	unknown	unknown	unknown
Opera Mobile Store	Mar 2011	closed	Opera; Software	300,000 (Nov 2014)	45 million per month (Dec 2012)	unknown	multiple Android, Java, Symbian, BlackBerry OS, Windows Mobile, iOS	70%: Android, Symbian, BlackBerry, Windows Mobile; 50%: Java	free	unknown	Android SDK, Java ME, S60, BlackBerry SDK, Windows Phone Developer Tools
Onside	Mar 2025	live	Onside	unknown	unknown	unknown	IOS	0-10%	free	Yes	Payment SDK
Pocket Gear	1999	closed	PocketGear	140,000 (Jun 2010)	unknown	unknown	multiple Android, BlackBerry OS, Java, Palm OS, Symbian, Windows Mobile	≈55%	free	unknown	—N/a
Rootpk	2022	live	Rootpk	700,000+ (Sep 2022)	unknown	unknown	Android	90%	free	Yes	—N/a
RuStore	2022	live	VK (company), MinTsifry Of Russia	21,000+ (Oct 2022)	unknown	unknown	Android	unknown	free	Yes	Android SDK
Updraft App Distribution	2014	live	Apps with love AG / Moqod BV.	unknown	350,000+ in 2022	15,000 Users in 2022	Android and iOS	0	free	Yes	iOS SDK, Android SDK
Uptodown App Store	Nov 2011	live	Uptodown; Technologies	2,500,000 (Mar 2021)	450 million per month (Nov 2021)	unknown	Android	80%	free	Yes	—N/a
	date established	status	owner	available apps	download count	install base	device platform	cut for developer per sale	developer fees (per year)	developer console	development platform(s) (SDK)

== See also ==
- Cloud gaming
- Mobile application management
- Mobile content management system
- Mobile device management
- List of mobile device management software
- Mobile security
- Over-the-air update
