= Appland =

Swedish cloud computing company

- Company type: Private
- Industry: cloud computing
- Founded: 2011
- Founder: Jonatan Redvik
- Headquarters: Gothenburg, Sweden
- Services: white label app store solutions
- Number of employees: 12 (2015)

Appland is a cloud computing company headquartered in Gothenburg, Sweden, that develops white label app store solutions for mobile operators, mobile devices, online communities, smart TVs, connected vehicles and internet of things.

In 2015, the company won "2015 Red Herring Top Europe Award" and a spot in "33-listan", an annual list of the 33 most promising Swedish startups awarded by Ny Teknik and Affärsvärlden.
