= Scrcpy =

Screen mirroring software

scrcpy

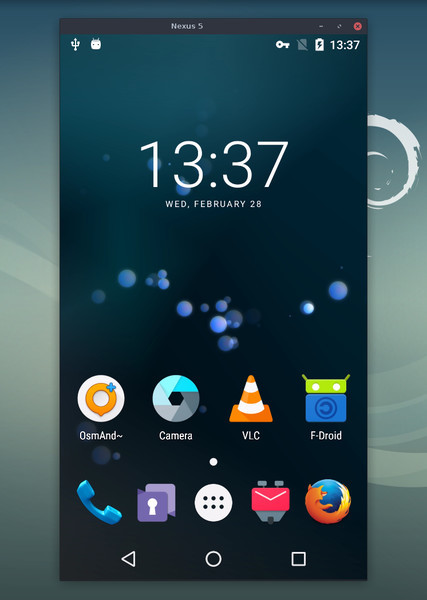
- scrcpy running on Debian
- Original author: Romain Vimont
- Initial release: March 8, 2018; 8 years ago
- Stable release: 4.0 / 12 May 2026; 33 days ago
- Written in: C, Java
- Operating system: Windows, macOS, Linux
- Platform: Cross-platform
- Type: Remote administration
- License: Apache License 2.0
- Repository: github.com/Genymobile/scrcpy

scrcpy (short for "screen copy") is a free and open-source screen mirroring application that allows control of an Android device from a desktop computer. The software is developed by Genymobile SAS, a company which develops Android emulator Genymotion.

The application primarily uses the Android Debug Bridge (ADB) via a USB connection to communicate. The software functions by executing a server natively on the Android device, then communicating with the server via a socket over an ADB tunnel. The screen content is streamed as H.264 video, which the software then decodes and displays on the computer. The software pushes keyboard and mouse input to the Android device over the server.

Setup involves enabling USB debugging on the Android device, connecting the device to the computer, and running the scrcpy application on the computer. Additional configuration options, such as changing the stream bit rate or enabling screen recording, may be accessed via command line arguments. The software also supports a wireless connection over Wi-Fi, but that requires more steps to set up. A few features were added to scrcpy in its version 1.9 release in 2019, including the ability to turn the screen off while mirroring and to copy clipboard content between the two devices.

Chris Hoffman of How-To Geek compared scrcpy to AirMirror and Vysor, two other applications with a similar function. Hoffman also pointed to Miracast as an alternative, while noting that it is no longer widely supported among new Android devices, and that it does not support remotely controlling the device.

The command-line interface of scrcpy was ported to a graphical user interface by open source developers. Implementations include QtScrcpy, guiscrcpy and scrcpy-gui.

== History ==
The first commit to the GitHub repository is on 12 December 2017 by Romain Vimont. scrcpy v1.0 was released 3 months later which included the support for basic screen mirroring and Android remote control. The first release packaged a Windows Executable and the server. The community took packaging forward and made scrcpy available for numerous Linux distributions.

Version v2.0, released on 12 March 2023, also added audio support, enabling real-time audio forwarding on Android 11 and above.

On v2.1, unveiled on June 22, 2023, significant enhancements have been made to the audio capabilities. Users can now select their device's microphone as the audio input, adjust the audio output buffer size, and benefit from a range of other updates. These updates include support for OpenGL 3.0+ on macOS, dynamic device folding, and the option to terminate adb upon closing.
