= GetJar =

Apk Store

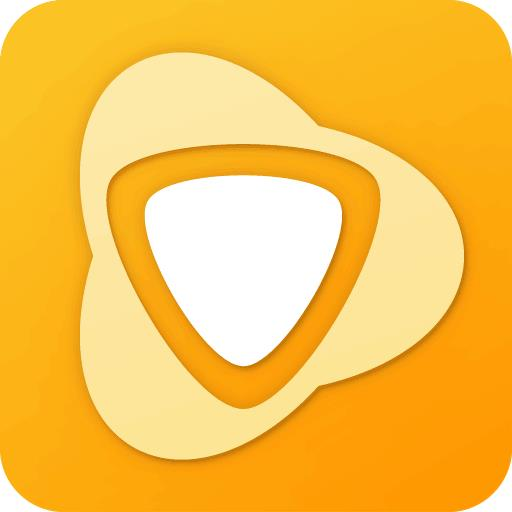

- Developer: GetJar
- Release: 2004
- Operating system: Android, Symbian, Windows Mobile
- Type: App store
- Website: getjar.com

GetJar is an independent mobile phone app store founded in Lithuania in 2004, with offices in Vilnius, Lithuania and San Mateo, California.

== History ==
The company was founded by Ilja Laurs in 2004, who was its Executive Chairman, and Chris Dury, who was the CEO. Accel Partners and Tiger Global Management were among the investors.

GetJar was started by developers for developers in 2004 as an app beta testing platform. The platform started making free apps available in early 2005.

In June 2010, about 300,000 software developers added apps to GetJar resulting in over one billion downloads. In July 2011, GetJar had over two billion downloads.

GetJar was initially acquired by Sungy Mobile in February 2014, but the deal ultimately fell.

In November 2014, GetJar was acquired by Eightpoint, formerly known as Spigot Inc., for an undisclosed amount. The acquisition marked a shift in strategy, bringing the platform under the umbrella of a digital media and app distribution company with a focus on high-growth mobile applications.

As of early 2015, the company provides more than 849,036 mobile apps across major mobile platforms including Java ME, BlackBerry, Symbian, Windows Mobile and Android and has over 3 million downloads per day. GetJar allows software developers to upload their applications for free through a developer portal.

In 2025, GetJar announced that it is actively working on a complete platform renewal. The company plans to reintroduce GetJar with a modernized interface, expanded app offerings, and new features that aim to recapture its position as a go-to destination for downloadable apps and playable games. While details remain under wraps, the announcement has sparked excitement among developers and nostalgic users alike, hinting at a bold new era for one of the original app marketplaces.

== See also ==
- List of digital distribution platforms for mobile devices
