= Qutoutiao =

Chinese mobile content aggregator

- Traded as: Nasdaq: QTT
- Founder: Eric Tan
- Headquarters: Shanghai, China
- Key people: Eric Tan
- Website: qutoutiao.net

Qutoutiao (Chinese: 趣头条) is a Chinese mobile content aggregator.

== History ==
The company was founded in 2016, and is based in Shanghai. In English, the name translates to "fun headlines."

Chinese billionaire Eric Tan is the chairman and co-founder.

The company is backed by Tencent Holdings.

By September 2018, it had around 17.1 million daily active users on its app, with monthly active users totaling 48.8 million.

Following an IPO and Nasdaq listing in September 2018, the company's stock price rose 128%, and with a valuation of over US$1 billion, it became a so-called unicorn company. The company left Nasdaq in 2023.

== Products ==
According to TechCrunch, the app "uses an AI-based content recommendation engine to display articles and videos based on user profiles."
