= Android software development =

Process of writing software for Android operating system

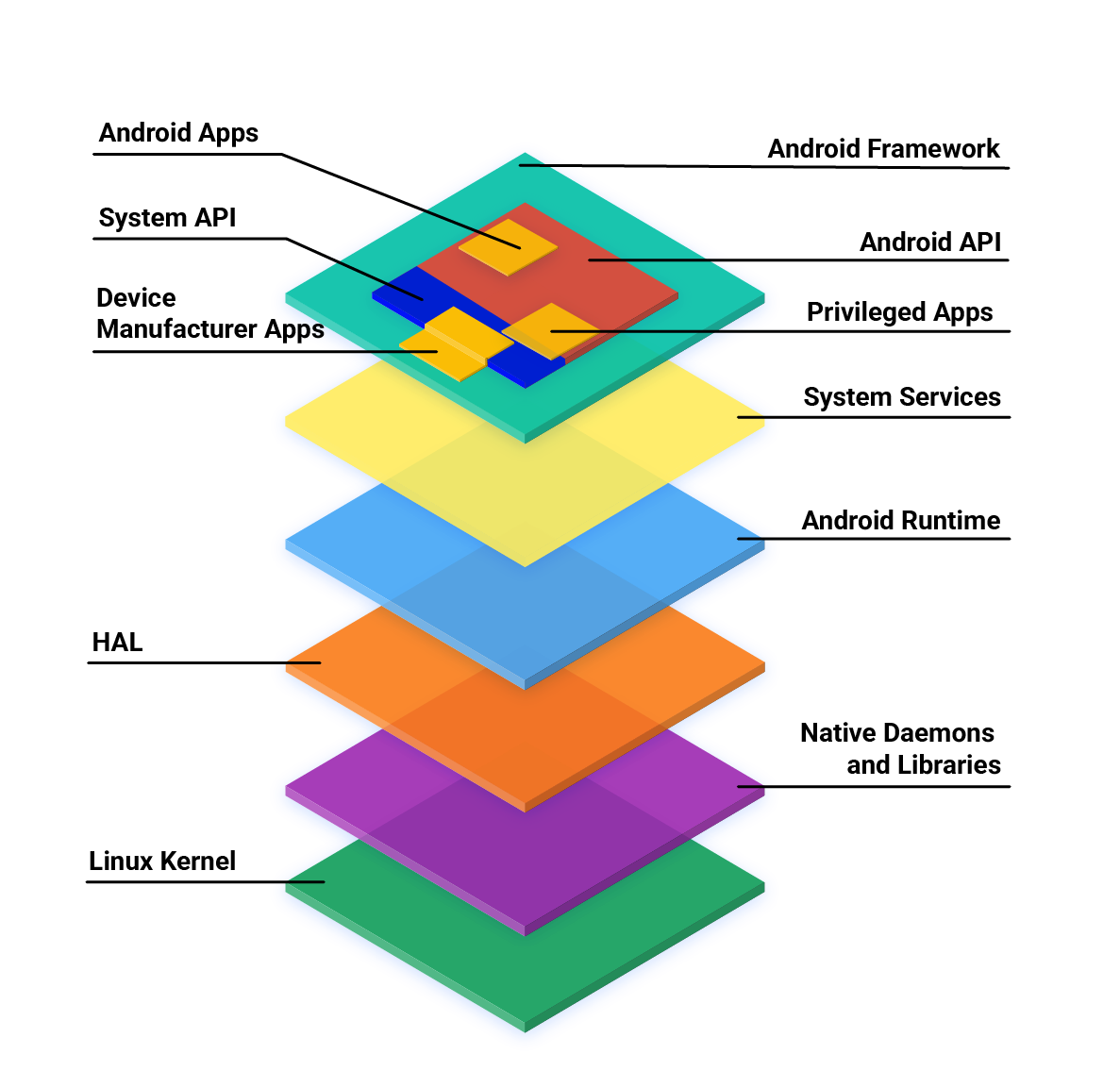
The Android stack

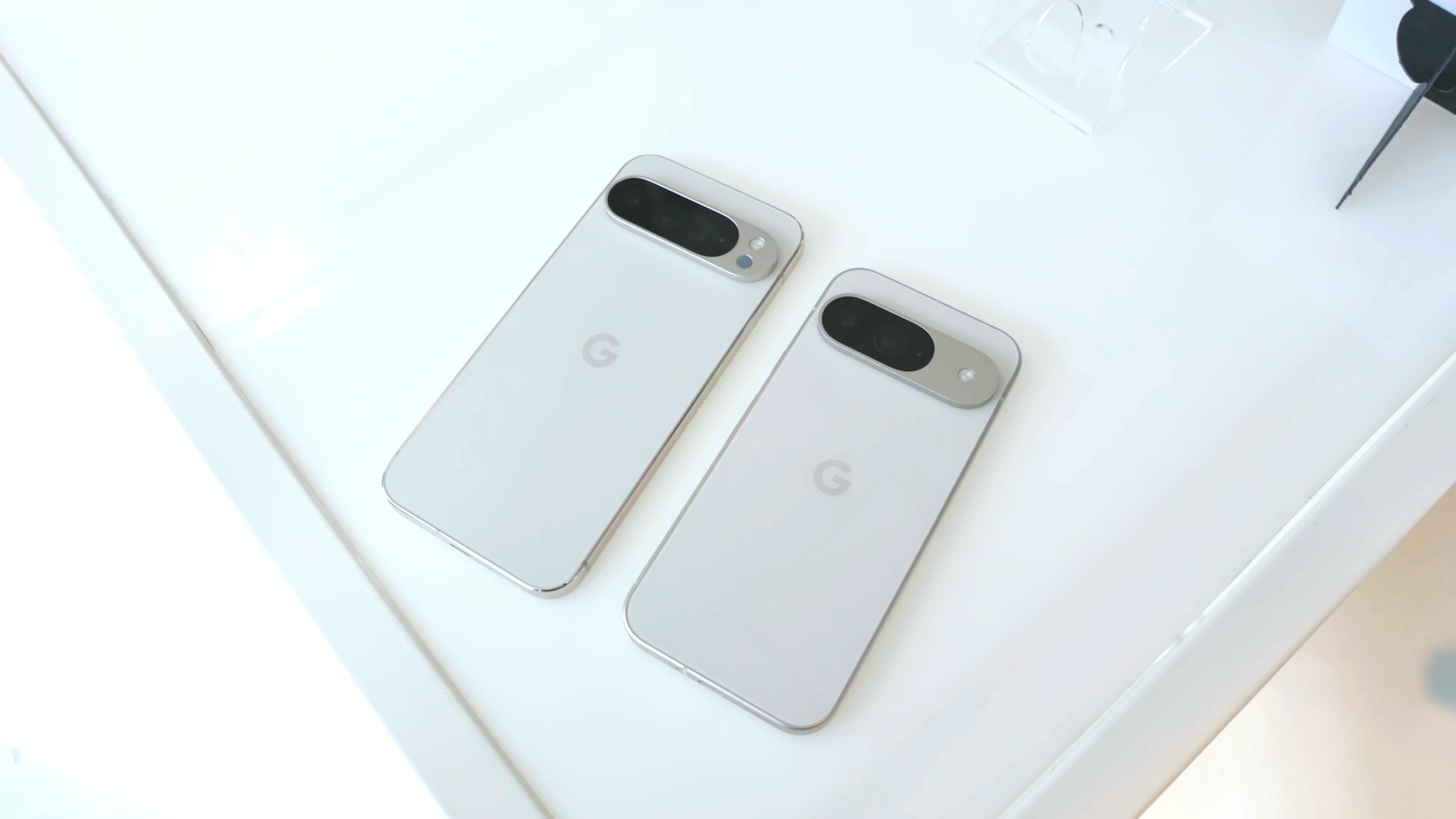
Google Pixel 9 and 9 Pro, part of the Google Pixel series, a range of ‘developer-friendly’ devices

Android software development is the process by which applications are created for devices running the Android mobile operating system. Google states that "Android apps can be written using Kotlin, Java, and C++ languages" using the Android software development kit (SDK), while using other languages is also possible. All non-Java virtual machine (JVM) languages, such as Go, JavaScript, C, C++ or assembly, need the help of JVM language code, that may be supplied by tools, likely with restricted API support. Some programming languages and tools allow cross-platform app support (i.e. for both Android and iOS). Third party tools, development environments, and language support have also continued to evolve and expand since the initial SDK was released in 2008. The official Android app distribution mechanism to end users is Google Play; it also allows staged gradual app release, as well as distribution of pre-release app versions to testers.

== Official development tools ==
The Android software development kit (SDK) includes a comprehensive set of development tools. The Android SDK Platform Tools are a separately downloadable subset of the full SDK, consisting of command-line tools such as adb and fastboot. The Android Debug Bridge (ADB) is a tool to run commands on a connected Android device. Fastboot is a protocol used for flashing filesystems. Code written in C/C++ can be compiled to ARM, or x86 native code (or their 64-bit variants) using the Android Native Development Kit (NDK).

=== Android Open Accessory Development Kit ===
The Android 3.1 platform (also backported to Android 2.3.4) introduces Android Open Accessory support, which allows external USB hardware (an Android USB accessory) to interact with an Android-powered device in a special "accessory" mode. When an Android-powered device is in accessory mode, the connected accessory acts as the USB host (powers the bus and enumerates devices) and the Android-powered device acts as the USB device. Android USB accessories are specifically designed to attach to Android-powered devices and adhere to a simple protocol (Android accessory protocol) that allows them to detect Android-powered devices that support accessory mode.

== External hardware development ==
Development tools intended to help an Android device interact with external electronics include IOIO, Android Open Accessory Development Kit, Microbridge, Triggertrap, etc.

== Android emulators and subsystems ==
- BlueStacks
- Genymotion
- MIT App Inventor
- Android Studio
- Waydroid

== Android Developer Challenge ==
The Android Developer Challenge was a competition to find the most innovative application for Android. Google offered prizes totaling 10 million US dollars, distributed between ADC I and ADC II. ADC I accepted submissions from January 2 to April 14, 2008. The 50 most promising entries, announced on May 12, 2008, each received a $25,000 award to further development. It ended in early September with the announcement of ten teams that received $275,000 each, and ten teams that received $100,000 each.

ADC II was announced on May 27, 2009. The first round of the ADC II closed on October 6, 2009. The first-round winners of ADC II comprising the top 200 applications were announced on November 5, 2009. Voting for the second round also opened on the same day and ended on November 25. Google announced the top winners of ADC II on November 30, with SweetDreams, What the Doodle!? and WaveSecure being nominated the overall winners of the challenge.

== Community-based distributions ==
There is a community of open source enthusiasts that build and share Android-based distributions (i.e. firmware) with a number of customizations and additional features, such as FLAC lossless audio support and the ability to store downloaded applications on the microSD card. This usually involves rooting the device. Rooting allows users root access to the operating system, enabling full control of the phone. Rooting has several disadvantages as well, including increased risk of hacking, high chances of bricking, losing warranty, increased virus attack risks, etc. It is also possible to install custom firmware, although the device's boot loader must also be unlocked. Custom firmware allows users of older phones to use applications available only on newer releases.

Those firmware packages are updated frequently, incorporate elements of Android functionality that haven't yet been officially released within a carrier-sanctioned firmware, and tend to have fewer limitations. CyanogenMod and OMFGB are examples of such firmware.

On September 24, 2009, Google issued a cease and desist letter to the modder Cyanogen, citing issues with the re-distribution of Google's closed-source applications within the custom firmware. Even though most of Android OS is open source, phones come packaged with closed-source Google applications for functionality such as the Google Play and GPS navigation. Google has asserted that these applications can only be provided through approved distribution channels by licensed distributors. Cyanogen complied with Google's license and continued to distribute its mod without the proprietary software. It provided a method to backup licensed Google applications during the mod's install process and restore them when the process is complete.

== Java standards ==
Obstacles to development include the fact that Android does not use established Java standards, that is, Java SE and ME. This prevents compatibility between Java applications written for those platforms and those written for the Android platform. Android reuses the Java language syntax and semantics, but it does not provide the full class libraries and APIs bundled with Java SE or ME. However, there are multiple tools in the market from companies such as Myriad Group and UpOnTek that provide Java ME to Android conversion services.

Android provides its own GUI classes, and does not provide Java AWT, Swing or JavaFX. It does not support the full Java Beans API.

== History and market share ==
Android was created by the Open Handset Alliance, which is led by Google. The early feedback on developing applications for the Android platform was mixed. Issues cited include bugs, lack of documentation, inadequate QA infrastructure, and no public issue-tracking system. (Google announced an issue tracker on January 18, 2008.) In December 2007, MergeLab mobile startup founder Adam MacBeth stated, "Functionality is not there, is poorly documented or just doesn't work... It's clearly not ready for prime time." Despite this, Android-targeted applications began to appear the week after the platform was announced. The first publicly available application was the Snake game.

A preview release of the Android SDK was released on November 12, 2007. On July 15, 2008, the Android Developer Challenge Team accidentally sent an email to all entrants in the Android Developer Challenge announcing that a new release of the SDK was available in a "private" download area. The email was intended for winners of the first round of the Android Developer Challenge. The revelation that Google was supplying new SDK releases to some developers and not others (and keeping this arrangement private) led to widely reported frustration within the Android developer community at the time.

On August 18, 2008, the Android 0.9 SDK beta was released. This release provided an updated and extended API, improved development tools and an updated design for the home screen. Detailed instructions for upgrading are available to those already working with an earlier release. On September 23, 2008, the Android 1.0 SDK (Release 1) was released. According to the release notes, it included "mainly bug fixes, although some smaller features were added." It also included several API changes from the 0.9 version. Multiple versions have been released since it was developed.

On December 5, 2008, Google announced the first Android Dev Phone, a SIM-unlocked and hardware-unlocked device that is designed for advanced developers. It was a modified version of HTC's Dream phone. While developers can use regular consumer devices to test and use their applications, some developers may choose a dedicated unlocked or no-contract device.

As of July 2013, more than one million applications have been developed for Android, with over 25 billion downloads. A June 2011 research indicated that over 67% of mobile developers used the platform, at the time of publication. Android smartphone shipments ware forecast to exceed 1.2 billion units in 2018 with an 85% market share.

In August 2021, the Play Store started requiring apps to be published as App Bundles, replacing APKs in the Play Store. App bundles contain a number of APKs for different device configurations and allow apps such as games to download additional assets as needed, with enough quality for a specific device.

== See also ==
- Android Studio
- List of free and open-source Android applications
- List of Kotlin software and tools
- Rooting (Android)

== Bibliography ==
- Ed, Burnette (July 13, 2010). Hello, Android: Introducing Google's Mobile Development Platform (3rd ed.). Pragmatic Bookshelf. ISBN 978-1-934356-56-2.
- Ableson, Frank; Sen, Robi; King, Chris (January 2011). Android in Action, Second Edition (2nd ed.). Manning. ISBN 978-1-935182-72-6.
- Conder, Shane; Darcey, Lauren (July 24, 2012). Android Wireless Application Development Volume II: Advanced Topics (3rd ed.). Addison-Wesley Professional. ISBN 978-0-321-81384-8.
- Murphy, Mark (June 26, 2009). Beginning Android (1st ed.). Apress. ISBN 978-1-4302-2419-8.
- Meier, Reto (March 2010). Professional Android 2 Application Development (1st ed.). Wrox Press. ISBN 978-0-470-56552-0.
- Haseman, Chris (July 21, 2008). Android Essentials (1st ed.). Apress. ISBN 978-1-4302-1064-1.
- Clifton, Ian (August 3, 2012). The Essentials of Android Application Development LiveLessons (Video Training) (1st ed.). Addison-Wesley Professional. ISBN 978-0-13-299658-7.
