= Handango =

Online software store

Handango, Inc.
- Type: Mobile Content Delivery
- Industry: Software Sales
- Founded: 1998
- Headquarters: Irving, TX
- Key people: Alex Bloom - CEO
- Revenue: $5.5 (est.) 2007 Sales (mil.)
- Number of employees: 51–200

Handango was an online store that sold mobile apps for personal digital assistants (PDAs) and smartphones. The company was headquartered in Irving, Texas.

== History ==
Handango was founded in 1999 by Randy Eisenman. In 2003, it launched Handango InHand, a mobile app store that enabled users to discover, purchase, and install software directly on their mobile devices. The service initially supported Symbian UIQ devices in 2003, and later expanded to include other major mobile platforms:

- Windows Mobile and Palm OS in 2004,
- Blackberry in 2005,
- Symbian S60 in 2006.

Users could access application descriptions, screenshots, user reviews and ratings, and download or purchase software directly on their devices.

In February 2010, PocketGear announced that it had acquired Handango. A year later, PocketGear rebranded as Appia and shifted its business model to a white-label, OEM-branded app store platform.

As a result of this strategic pivot, both the Handango and PocketGear websites were shut down in 2013.

== See also ==
- List of digital distribution platforms for mobile devices
- Amazon Appstore
- App Store (iOS/iPadOS)
- BlackBerry World
