= Aptoide =

Online marketplace for Android and iOS apps

- Icon since 2023
- Developer: Aptoide
- Written in: Java
- Working state: Current
- Source model: Open-source software
- Initial release: November 17, 2009; 16 years ago
- Marketing target: Smartphone; Tablet computer
- Available in: Multi-lingual
- Supported platforms: ARM, Android-x86
- License: GPLv3
- Official website: en.aptoide.com

Aptoide is an online marketplace for mobile applications which runs on the Android and iOS (Note: Only in the European Union.) operating systems. Aptoide is also available on smart TVs, STBs, and VR devices. A separate Aptoide Kids app includes kid friendly content. The software package is published by Aptoide S.A., a for-profit company incorporated in 2011, and headquartered in Lisbon, Portugal.

Aptoide utilizes a decentralized store model; users can manage their own store. The concept is inspired by the APT packaging manager, which can work with multiple sources (repositories). When the user wants a package, they can use the client to search for sources where the application is stored. The Android application used to access the stores is open source, and there are several forks such as F-Droid. The communication between the client and servers is done using an open protocol based on XML.

The name Aptoide is formed from the words "APT" (the Debian package manager) and "oide" (the last syllable of "Android").

== History ==
The first stage of development was developed at the Caixa Mágica Summer Camp in 2009 then later in the scope of SAPO Summerbits.

The idea behind Aptoide came from different sources. On one hand, the research in Linux installers in Mancoosi European Project, Paulo Trezentos PhD project and Portugal Telecom A5 phone, project where the team participated.

In the end of 2010, it was launched in the Bazaar Android site. Bazaar Android provided the possibility for the users to create their own store. In August 2012, Aptoide and Bazaar Android brands were merged to allow a better communication.

In 2011, Aptoide S.A. was incorporated in Lisbon, Portugal, as a spin-off of CM Software.

In 2011, F-Droid was forked from Aptoide.

In 2013, Aptoide received a total of 750,000 euros in seed funding from Portugal Ventures.

In 2015, the company secured a Series A financing round of 3.7 million euros (4 million dollars), led by German venture capital firm e.ventures with co-investment from Gobi Partners (China) and Golden Gate Ventures (Singapore). The investment has allowed Aptoide to grow its team, currently having over 60 employees.

In 2014, Aptoide filed a European Union Antitrust complaint against Google, claiming that Google creates obstacles for users to install third-party app stores, links essential services with Google Play (thus blocking, again, these third-party app stores), and blocks access to Aptoide websites in its Chrome Web browser.

In May 2015, Aptoide announced that it would start its operations in Asia by opening an office in Singapore.

In 2017, Aptoide announced that it would be working with AppCoin and "enter the digital currency business with the plainly named AppCoins. Launched in conjunction with the 2017 Web Summit edition, the $18 million Initial Coin Offering (ICO) will allow users to use AppCoins to pay each other or for in-app purchases, such as game upgrades." Appcoin's 200 million users will be incentivized to engage with advertising to earn currency.

== Description ==
=== Android client ===
Aptoide client allows searching, browsing, and installing applications on devices running a version of the Android operating system. Aptoide is available in 17 languages.

Non-Google app providers such as Aptoide, F-Droid, and the Amazon Appstore are not available from the Google Play Store due to the 4.5 Non-compete clause of Google Play Developer Distribution Agreement. To install Aptoide the Aptoide installable file must be downloaded, usually from the Aptoide site. The Android device's settings must be configured to allow installation from "Unknown sources", and the app can be sideloaded.

After the installation of Aptoide which provides the default Apps store, other stores (repositories) can be added; there are many different ones. When a store is added using its URL, Aptoide retrieves its list of applications and stores it locally, allowing apps to be browsed or searched for.

In June 2011, Aptoide Uploader was released as a "sister" application from the same development team. Aptoide Uploader is an Android app that allows users to upload to an existent Aptoide store.

Aptoide Uploader uses the available Aptoide Webservices to upload the application. The submitted APK file is kept in the user's store where they it can be managed.

=== Interfaces ===
The communication between the Android client applications and the store is done using a XML file called info.xml. This file lists the applications in the store as well the basic information about each application available. Info.xml is open and a detailed definition is available.

Part of info.xml file:

<apklst>
  <version>5</version>
  <repository>
    <basepath>http://mirror.apk10.aptoide.com/apks/10/aptoide-f63c6f2461f65f32b6d144d6d2ff982e/aptoidedev/</basepath>
    <appscount>1</appscount>
    ...
  </repository>
  <package>
    <name>Aptoide</name>
      ...
  </package>

There are two other XML files: extra.xml and stats.xml.

Extra.xml contains additional information about the apps such as the full description. The file "stats.xml" contains the downloads and likes of the available applications.

== Usage ==
Aptoide usage was reported as follows:

Aptoide version	Date	Unique Yearly Users	# Stores	Different apps	Cumulative downloads
9.0.0	5 June 2018	150,000,000		1,000,000	7,000,000,000
8.3	30 May 2017	142,000,000	250,000	900,000	3,600,000,000
8.0.0	3 October 2016		200,000	660,000	2,700,000,000
6.5.2	July 2015	100,000,000	140,000	330,000	1,580,000,000
6.3.0	April 2015		136,000	311,000	1,424,000,000
6.2.3			126,000	275,000	1,276,000,000
5.0.0	20 March 2014				
4.1.3	22 July 2013	1,300,000	350,000	120,000	380,000,000
4.0.0	4 December 2012	500,000	170,000	50,000	150,000,000
2.7.1	2 August 2012	200,000	88,000	65,000	60,000,000
2.7	19 June 2012	107,000	62,000	43,000	44,000,000
2.6.2	April 2012	82,000	51,000	34,000	32,000,000
2.6.1	2 March 2012	57,000	36,000	19,000	22,900,000
2.6	20 January 2012	42,000	27,100	16,000	17,400,000
2.5.4	22 December 2011	34,000	22,200	13,400	14,000,000
2.5.3	2 November 2011	21,000	13,300	9,400	9,100,000
2.5.2	22 September 2011	14,800	10,300	7,700	6,800,000
2.5.1	22 June 2011	6,800	3,500	4,000	2,100,000
2.5	3 June 2011	5,300	1,200	3,100	2,000,000
2.4.1	May 2011	3,700	1,600	2,000	1,500,000

== See also ==
- List of mobile app distribution platforms
- Digital Markets Act
- European Economic Area
- Android (operating system)
