= TWRP (software) =

Open-source custom Android recovery mode

Team Win Recovery Project (TWRP)
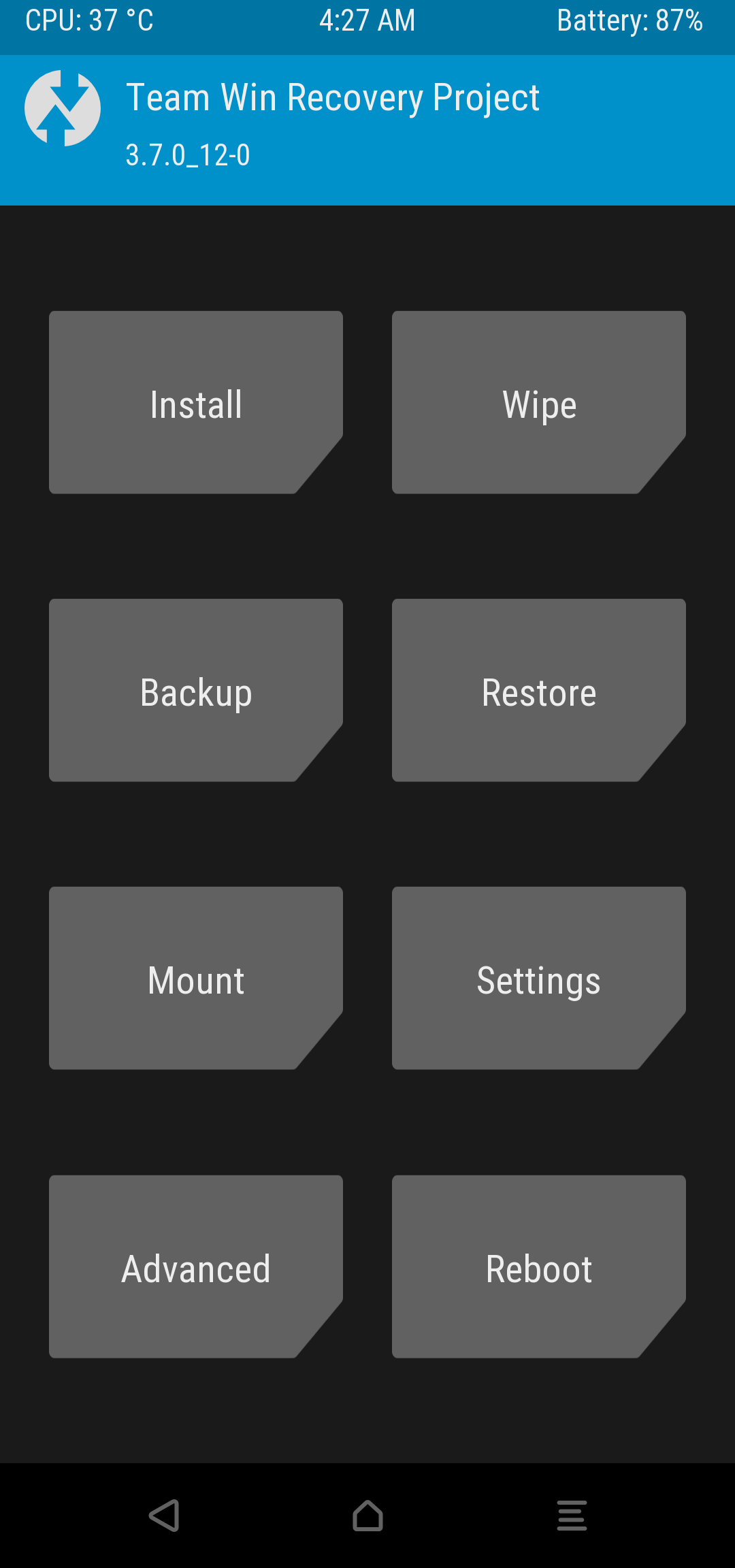
- Main screen of TWRP 3.7.0_12-0
- Original author: OmniROM
- Developer: Team Win
- Release: 30 July 2011; 15 years ago
- Stable release: 3.7.1 (when building with Android 12.1 branch); 3.7.0 (when building with Android 9-11 branches); 3.6.0 (when building with Android 12 branch) / 21 February 2024; 2 years ago
- Written in: C++, C, shell, make, Java
- Operating system: Android
- Platform: Android
- Available in: English, Spanish, Russian, Czech, Slovenian, Polish, Indonesian, Dutch, German, Turkish, Portuguese (Portugal), Italian, French, Swedish, Portuguese (BR), Greek, Hungarian, Ukrainian, Sinhala, Chinese (Simplified and Traditional), Japanese
- License: GNU General Public License v3
- Website: twrp.me
- Repository: github.com/Teamwin/android_bootable_recovery

Team Win Recovery Project (TWRP; pronounced /ˈtwɜːrp/ "twerp") is an open-source Android recovery mode for Android-based devices. It provides a touchscreen-enabled interface that allows users to install third-party firmware and back up the current system, functions usually not supported by stock recovery images. It is, therefore, often installed when flashing, installing, or rooting Android devices, although it does not require a device to be rooted before installation.

== Functions ==
Since February 2016, the first three digits of the version number specify the version, and the fourth digit, separated from the others by a dash, specifies an update for a specific device. This could be a performance improvement, hotfix, bugfix, or just simply an update for a device.

The main method of installing ("flashing") this custom recovery on an Android device requires downloading a version made specifically for the device, and then using a tool such as Fastboot or Odin. Some custom ROMs come with TWRP as the default recovery image.

TWRP gives users the option to back up their device, either in full or in part. This means that users can back up their system and data (user data) (giving users a backup of all support files and apps installed to those partitions), boot and recovery (which is beneficial for those users who change kernel or recovery versions, as well as those who root their device using Magisk), cache, and internal storage partition. These partitions can also be restored, giving users the ability to go back to what they backed up, and wiped or erased. It also has a built-in file manager so that users can engage in file maintenance without actually booting into their device's system, and a built-in terminal emulator. TWRP also supports file transfer via MTP, and ADB sideloading. TWRP is also fully themeable.

While TWRP has always supported the installation of custom ROMs (i.e. custom operating systems such as LineageOS, or the latest Android release), kernels, add-ons (Google Apps, themes, etc.), and other various mods, TWRP has expanded its support to installing Magisk.

In January 2017, the TWRP team released an Android application that allows flashing the recovery using root access. However, unlike the recovery, the app is not open source, although free of charge. This app is also shipped via the official TWRP images to rooted and non-rooted devices. It is installed in the system partition, making it a system-level app by default, so that it cannot be uninstalled from within Android without root access. However, TWRP now provides the user the freedom of choice for having the app.

== See also ==
- ClockworkMod Recovery – a past alternative to TWRP custom recovery.
