= Unlock =

Unlock, unlocking and unlockable may refer to:

== Bypassing security ==
- To undo a lock (security device)
- Phone unlocking, the removal of a SIM lock on a mobile phone
- Bootloader unlocking, the disabling of bootloader security checks that prevent unsigned software from running
- iOS jailbreaking, removing the limitations imposed by Apple, Inc. on iOS devices
- Rooting (Android), allowing users of Android devices to obtain root access within Android's subsystem (similar to iOS jailbreaking)

== Music ==
- Unlock (album), a 2018 album by Day6
- Unlock!, a 2024 album by Little Glee Monster
- "Unlock" (song), a 2016 song by KAT-TUN
- "Unlock", a 2024 song by ¥$, an unreleased track intended to be on Vultures 1
- Unlock: Go Live In Life, a 2020 concert by Stray Kids

== Video games ==
- Unlockable (gaming), content that is available in video games but not accessible unless something is performed by the user to access to it
  - Unlockable character, characters that can be unlocked in a video game
  - Unlockable games, full video games that can be unlocked within another video game, often as easter eggs

== Other uses ==
- Unlock (charity), a British charity
- Unlock!, a board game; winner of a 2017 As d'Or game award

== See also ==
- Unlocked (disambiguation)
- Lock (disambiguation)
