= DivestOS =

Discontinued, open source, Android operating system

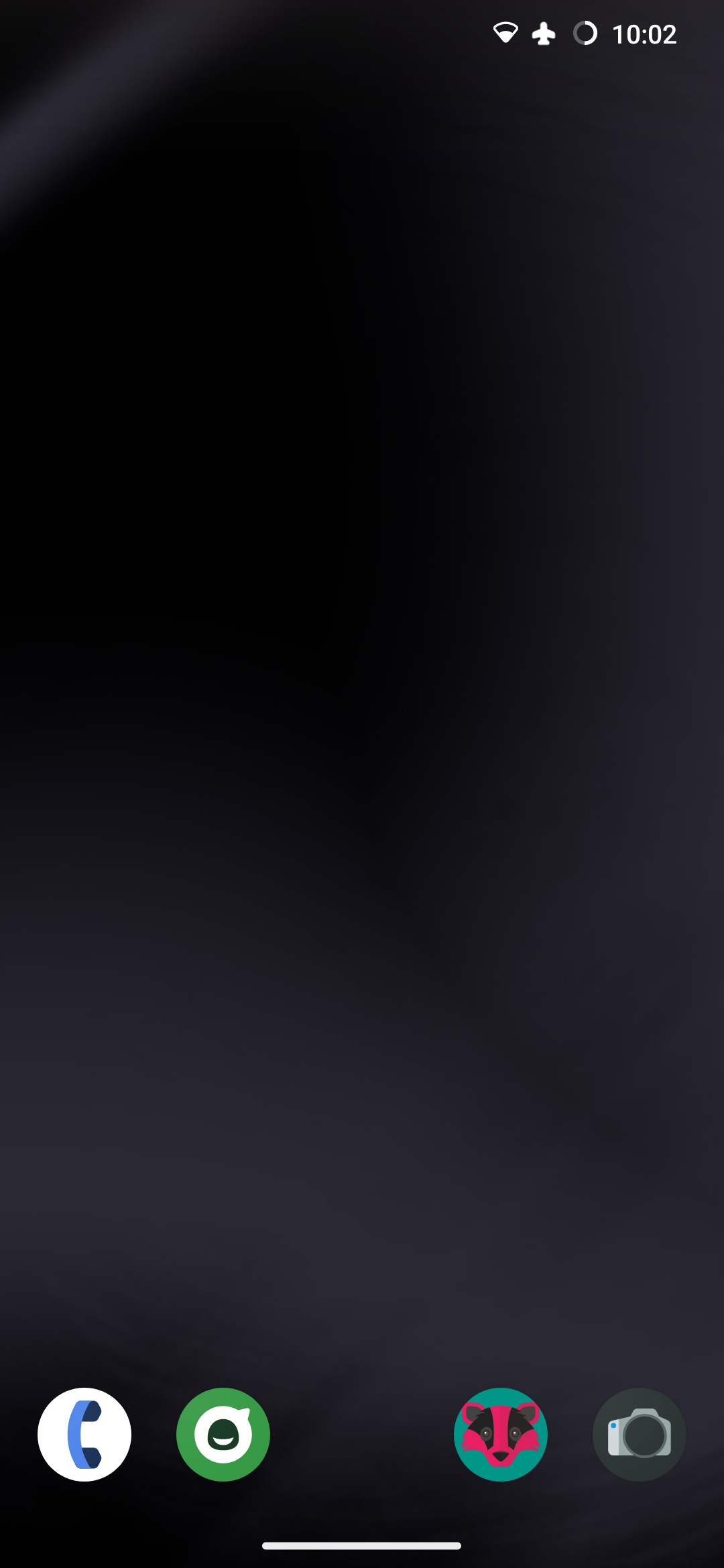
- DivestOS homescreen on a Fairphone 4
- Developer: Tavi
- OS family: Android (Linux)
- Working state: Discontinued
- Source model: Open source
- Initial release: 31 December 2014; 11 years ago
- Final release: December 18th 2024 Update / 18 December 2024; 21 months ago
- Repository: gitlab.com/divested-mobile
- Marketing target: Privacy/Security-focused operating system replacement for Android devices
- Update method: Over-the-air (OTA) or locally
- Package manager: APK; F-Droid (app store)
- Supported platforms: ARM
- Kernel type: Monolithic (Linux)
- License: GPL
- Official website: "DivestOS". Archived from the original on 19 December 2024.

DivestOS is a discontinued open source Android-based operating system. It was a soft fork of LineageOS that aimed to increase security and privacy with support for end-of-life devices. It removed many proprietary blobs and pre-installed open source apps.

DivestOS builds were signed with release-keys so bootloaders may be re-locked on supported devices. (Note: Not all Android devices support relocking the bootloader with a third party operating system installed.) An automated CVE patcher was used to patch the kernels against many known vulnerabilities.

DivestOS includes few default applications. F-Droid was included, as well as Hypatia, a "real-time malware scanner" and Carrion, a robocall blocker.

== History ==
The DivestOS project began in 2014, with the first properly signed builds being released in 2015.

Public release of DivestOS was announced on F-Droid forums in June 2020.

In December 2024, Tavi announced the discontinuation of DivestOS, its apps (notably the Firefox-based browser Mull) and XMPP Chatrooms. While the mobile operating system was discontinued, the announcement elaborated that non-mobile Divest projects would continue to receive maintenance.

== Supported devices ==
DivestOS primarily supported devices that had been supported by LineageOS, with additional end of life devices receiving extended support. The entire list of officially supported devices was available on the DivestOS website.

== Reception ==
In February 2022, TechTracker.in said DivestOS is one of few custom ROMs focusing on security and privacy, with monthly and incremental updates.

GNU/Linux.ch Linux and Freie Software News called DivestOS "relatively new and ambitious" and said it supports many devices, both newer and older.

DevsJournal called DivestOS 18.1 one of the best custom ROMs for the OnePlus One phone.

DivestOS' Hypatia malware scanner for Android, and how to use their F-Droid repository, was reviewed by Gadget Hacks in March 2021.

In March 2023, the 2022 Free Software Foundation Award for Outstanding New Free Software Contributor went to Tad (SkewedZeppelin), chief developer of the DivestOS project.

== See also ==
- Comparison of mobile operating systems
- List of custom Android distributions
- List of security-focused operating systems
- Tor Phone
