= Unlocked =

Unlocked may refer to:

== Film and television ==
- Unlocked (2006 film), an American short film
- Unlocked (2017 film), an American thriller film
- Unlocked (2023 film), a South Korean thriller film
- Police Files: Unlocked, a 2006–2008 Australian police documentary television series

== Music ==
- Unlocked (Verbs album), 2003
- Unlocked (Meisa Kuroki album), 2012
- Unlocked (Alexandra Stan album), 2014
- Unlocked (Denzel Curry and Kenny Beats album), 2020
- "Unlocked", a song by French Montana, Max B, and Kanye West from Wave Gods 2: Cosmos Brothers

== See also ==
- Unlock (disambiguation)
