= Tragedy (KAT-TUN song) =

Single by KAT-TUN

from the album KAT-TUN 10th Anniversary Best "10Ks"
- A-side: "Tragedy"
- B-side: Tokyo Starry (LE 1); Atsukunare (LE 2/ RE); Feathers (RE); Twilight (RE)
- Released: 10 February 2016
- Genre: J-Pop
- Length: 4:02
- Label: J-One Records/J-Storm
- Songwriter(s): Forest Young, SHUNSUKE HARADA, TKMZ
- Producer(s): Johnny H. Kitagawa

KAT-TUN singles chronology
"Kiss Kiss Kiss" (2015)	"Tragedy" (2016)	"Unlock" (2016)

Tragedy is the 25th single released by Japanese boy band KAT-TUN. It was released in Japan on February 10, 2016 under the record label J-One Records/J-Storm.

== Overview ==
=== Single Information ===
"Tragedy" is the twenty-fifth single released by KAT-TUN. It comes in three versions: Limited Editions 1 and 2 and a Regular Edition.

The Limited Edition 1 includes the song "Tragedy", the B-side song "Tokyo Starry" and the Promotional Video and Making of "Tragedy". Limited Edition 2 includes the title song, another B-side song "Atsukunare" and the Promotional Video and Making of Atsukunare. The Regular Edition includes the same songs as the Limited Edition 2 and with two added songs, "Feathers" and "Twilight" and the original karaoke versions of the first two songs.

=== Media Tie-up ===
The song "Tragedy" was chosen as the opening song for the Yomiuri TV/NTV series animation titled "Kindaichi Shounen no Jikenbo R". This is the first anime tie-up song recorded by KAT-TUN.

The song "Atsukunare" was used as the theme song of the NTV Sports Program "Going! Sports & News" and was also the image song for the NTV Professional Baseball Live Broadcast "Tsugi no Shunkan, Atsukunare".

== Promotions ==
For this single, a 16-page lyrics booklet was enclosed in the Limited Edition 1, and an 8-page lyric cards were enclosed in both the Limited Edition 2 and Regular Edition. B2-sized calendar-posters were included for each version for the single's early-bird pre-order bonus.

== Track listings ==
=== Limited Edition 1 ===
CD

Title	Lyrics	Music	Arrangement	Length
Tragedy	Forest Young	SHUNSUKE HARADA, TKMZ	Shunsuke Harada	4:02
Tokyo Starry	RUCCA	King of slick, TAKAROT	TAKAROT, Shinji Tanaka	4:11

DVD

- Tragedy (Music Video + Making of)

=== Limited Edition 2 ===
CD

Title	Lyrics	Music	Arrangement	Length
Tragedy	Forest Young	SHUNSUKE HARADA, TKMZ	Shunsuke Harada	4:02
Atsukunare (熱くなれ)	RUCCA	King of slick, KOUDAI IWATSUBO	King of slick	4:26

DVD

- Atsukunare (熱くなれ) (Music Video + Making of)

=== Regular Edition ===
CD

Title	Lyrics	Music	Arrangement	Length
Tragedy	Forest Young	SHUNSUKE HARADA, TKMZ	Shunsuke Harada	4:02
Atsukunare (熱くなれ)	RUCCA	King of slick, KOUDAI IWATSUBO	King of slick	4:26
Feathers	KAHLUA	Albi Albertsson, Leon Palmen, Carlos Okabe	MUSSASHI	3:49
Twilight	25→graffiti	Hanif Sabzevari, Peo Dahl, KOUDAI IWATSUBO	Billy Marx Jr.	4:34
Tragedy (Original Karaoke)				
Atsukunare (熱くなれ) (Original Karaoke)				

== Chart performance ==
"Tragedy" has sold over 129,000 copies on its first week and has reached the number one spot on the Oricon Weekly CD Singles Ranking chart. This makes the 25th single that KAT-TUN has released that reached the number one spot on its first week, placing them in second place after KinKi Kids who has a record of 35 consecutive no.1 singles.

"Tragedy" has ranked at number 40 in the Oricon Annual Sales Ranking for 2016 for having sold over 144,954 copies and has also received the Gold Certification from the Recording Industry Association of Japan.
