= ClockworkMod =

Company known for its so named custom Android Recovery

ClockworkMod Recovery
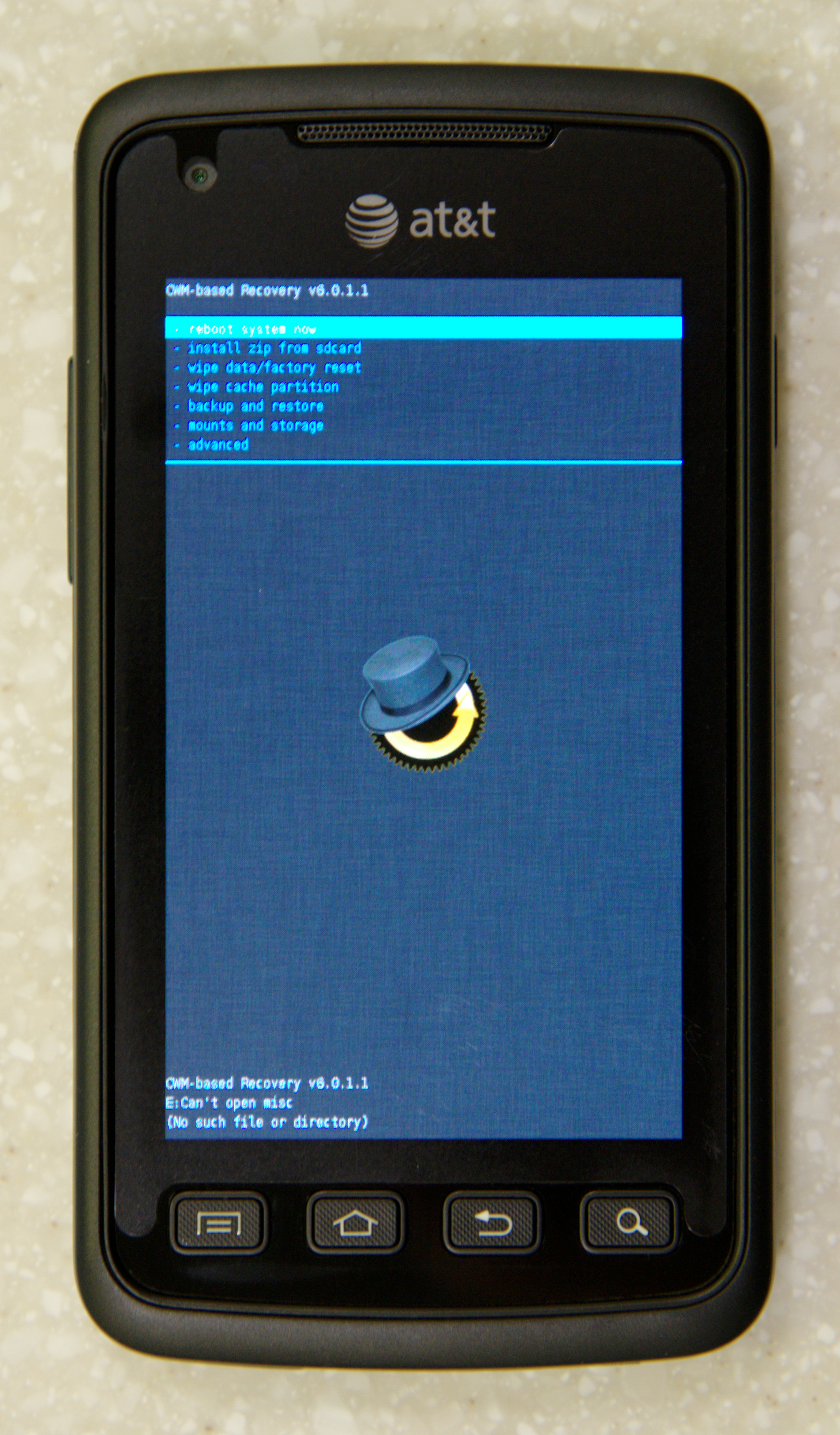
- Original author: ClockworkMod
- Written in: C, C++
- Operating system: Android
- Successor: CyanogenMod Recovery; LineageOS Recovery (Note: Forked from CyanogenMod and uses the same path.)
- License: Apache License 2.0
- Website: github.com (archived)
- Repository: at Github

ClockworkMod is a software company, owned by Koushik "Koush" Dutta, which develops various software products for Android smartphones and tablets. The company is primarily known for its custom recovery image, ClockworkMod Recovery, which is used in many custom ROMs.

== ClockworkMod Recovery ==
ClockworkMod Recovery was an Android custom recovery image which was built upon Google's AOSP recovery, much like other custom recoveries, such as TWRP and both CyanogenMod's and LineageOS's. Once installed, this recovery image replaced the Android device's stock recovery image. Using this recovery image, various system-level operations could be performed. For example, one could create and restore partition backups, root, install, and upgrade custom ROMs.

ClockworkMod Recovery was released under the terms of the Apache License 2.0 software license. CyanogenMod (and LineageOS, being a fork of CyanogenMod) Recovery is a fork of ClockworkMod Recovery. (Note: From the archive URL and)

=== Compared to other recoveries ===
- Unlike TWRP, but like the stock recovery, CWM Recovery uses volume buttons to navigate menus.
- Like the stock recovery, CWM can receive over-the-air updates for ROMs designed for their respective recoveries.
- Signature verification is not enforced on CWM Recovery, allowing the installation of Custom ROMs.
- CWM Recovery adds Nandroid backup support. This feature may not be present on CWM Recovery forks or successors.

== Other software ==
The company also provides the following apps:

- ROM Manager: An app for installing custom operating systems, known as ROMs. It was briefly pulled for violating Google Play's in-app-purchase policies.
- Tether: An app used for tethering regardless of carrier restrictions.
- Helium: An app used to backup user and system data to a phone without the need for root.
- DeskSMS: An app for sending and receiving text messages from an email, browser, or instant messenger client.
- AllCast: An app that enables streaming of local and cloud videos to Chromecast, AppleTV, FireTV, and DLNA devices.
- Vysor: An app that allows mirroring and control of an Android device through a desktop computer. It was temporarily removed due to licensing issues.

== See also ==
- TWRP – an alternative to ClockworkMod Recovery
