= Bootloader unlocking =

Process of disabling secure boot

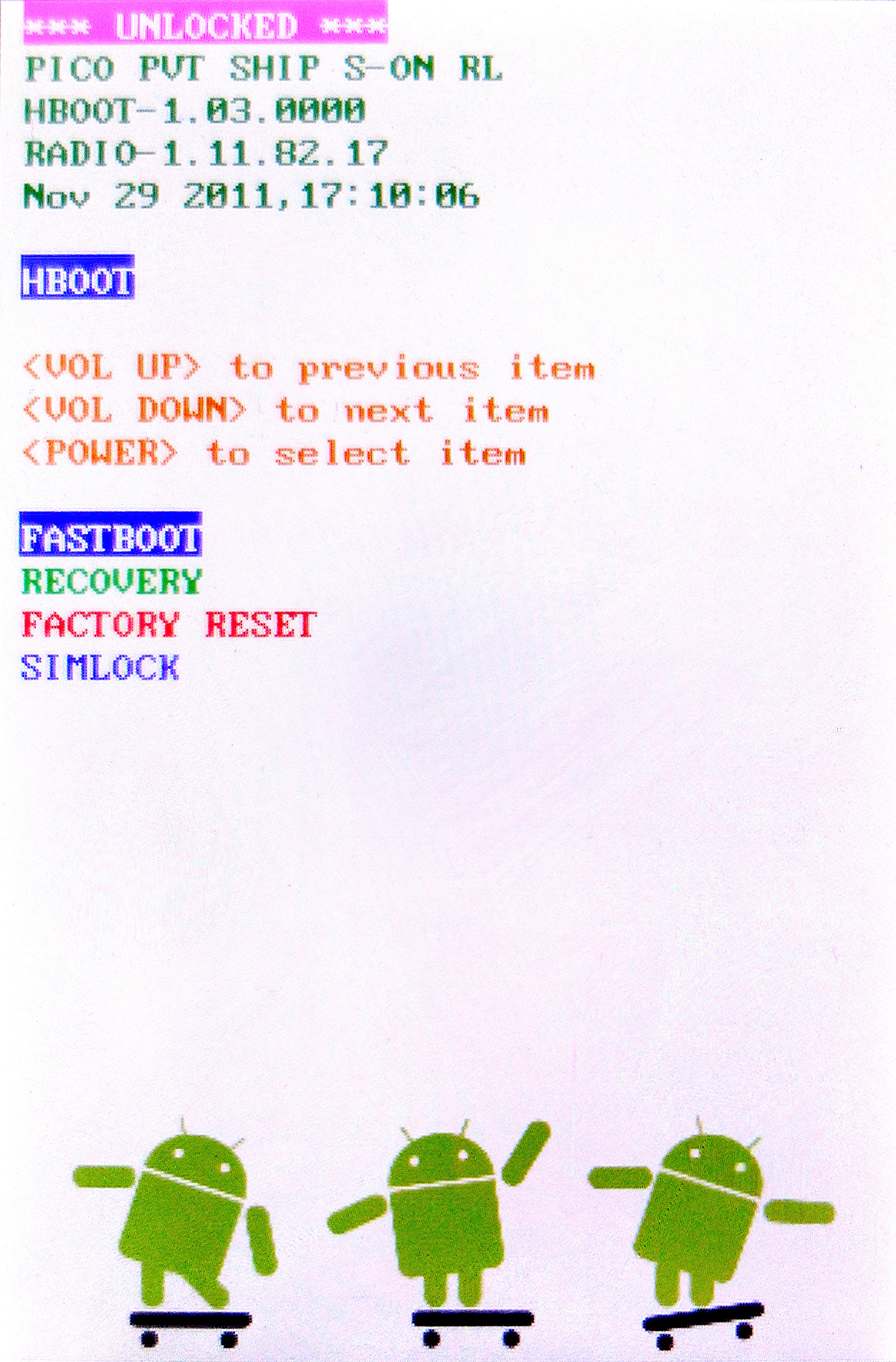
An unlocked bootloader on an HTC Explorer (Pico), showing additional available options

Bootloader unlocking is the process of disabling the bootloader security that enforces secure boot during the boot procedure. It can allow advanced customizations, such as installing custom firmware, or replacing the operating system with another one. Some bootloaders are not locked at all and some are locked, but can be unlocked with a command, a setting or with assistance from the manufacturer. Some do not include an unlocking method and can only be unlocked through a software exploit.

Bootloader unlocking is also done for mobile forensics purposes, to extract digital evidence from mobile devices, using tools such as Cellebrite UFED.

== Background ==
Unlocking the bootloader allows installing and running unsigned code on a device, including user customized software. Operating outside the manufacturer specification might usually result in voiding any warranties and may make the device susceptible to data theft, as the integrity of the operating system (as intended by the manufacturer) can no longer be guaranteed. On Chromebooks, enabling developer mode makes the system less secure than a standard laptop running Linux. Unlocking the bootloader may require reinitialization, formatting to factory settings, or otherwise lead to data loss on Android and ChromeOS devices. This is due to the fact that some user data is impossible to back up without root permission. This will also lead to certain security apps not working, such as Samsung Knox for which the counter would be stuck at "0x1."

Sascha Segan from PCMag considered a non unlockable bootloader a mistake on the Qualcomm Snapdragon Insiders phone, which is targeted at advanced users.

== Platforms ==
=== Android ===
Unlocking the bootloader is typically a prerequisite of obtaining root access and/or installing an alternative operating system.

Android bootloader unlocking as of 2026
Manufacturer	Difficulty level	Method/Notes	Requires internet connection?
Google	Easy (non-Verizon) Medium (Verizon, as of 2018) Impossible (newer Verizon phones)	Command-line (unlocked variant, not restricted to carrier, and non-Verizon carrier variants when paid off fully)	Yes
Samsung	Complicated: Some very old Android versions - available with usual flashing tools.; North American versions; Below March 2021 security update - Freely unavailable, commercially available (required unlock tokens that are officially unobtainable, but obtainable by third parties through yet publicly unknown means, resold as paid shady services available in Telegram and Discord), additionally modified flashing tools and firmwares are required.; Above March 2021 security update - unavailable.; Other versions; Below One UI 8.0 - freely available.; Any versions above One UI 8.0 - unavailable	Enable option that allows OEM unlock (if it exists) in Development settings, then unlock bootloader in Download mode. Samsung Knox (on supported devices) will be permanently tripped if modified or custom firmware is flashed, so Samsung Wallet, Secure Folder and applications making use of the Knox framework will be permanently unusable even if the bootloader is re-locked. Prior to One UI 8.0, devices sold outside of North America had the OEM Unlock option to unlock the bootloader. From One UI 8.0, Samsung has removed the ability to unlock the bootloader in all regions.	Yes
OnePlus	Easy (non-T-Mobile,non mainland China, 2025+); Medium (T-Mobile) Hard (Mainland China, 2025+)	Command-line, except on T-Mobile US variants where an unlock code is needed or mainland China versions released from 2025 and onwards that require the In-depth test app, which starting with ColorOS 17 requires a Chinese ID and phone number, alongside only a certain amount of devices will be unlocked per day.	No
Xiaomi	Hard (MIUI powered devices); Very Hard (non-Chinese HyperOS powered devices); Very Hard (China Mainland)	On MIUI, you will need to enable developer options, bootloader unlocking and then Mi Unlock. You must connect your Mi account and use the PC MiUnlockTool. Requires a 3-7 day old Mi account. On devices with Xiaomi HyperOS outside mainland China, you need to request bootloader unlock permissions in the Xiaomi Community app (requires change to Global region in set up) before proceeding with bootloader unlocking. Requires a 1-month-old Xiaomi account. For Mainland China devices with HyperOS, bootloader unlock for most devices has not been available until early 2026 when some developers found a vulnerability and successfully used that to unlock bootloader of many but not all Xiaomi devices. Not sure if this exploit got patched yet.	Yes
Asus	Impossible	Unavailable since August 2023, when first-party apps were removed and servers were shut down.	Yes
Sony	Medium	Command-line, request code at Sony website	Yes
Fairphone	Medium Easy (newer software versions)	Command-line, request code at Fairphone website or forum Settings > Enable Developer Options > Toggle Bootloader Unlocking in the Developer Options > Wait for verification	Yes
Motorola	Varies widely between model and SoC manufacturer Medium (Except Verizon, AT&T, TracFone) Impossible (Verizon, AT&T, TracFone)	Command-line, request code at Motorola website	Yes
Realme	Medium-Hard (China Mainland and India); Hard (select global models, e.g. Realme C35 (Global)); Highly Restricted (Other Global models)	Command-line, via the official "In-Depth Test" application. However, official support has been deprecated for most Global variants and devices with Unisoc (Spreadtrum) chipsets, leaving community-developed exploits as the only viable method.	Yes
Nothing	Easy	Command-line	No
Huawei	Medium-Hard (older Kirin SoCs, Kirin 990 and older) Very Hard (MediaTek devices) Impossible (all newer Kirin SoCs, Kirin 9000 and newer)	Select Huawei phones using the Kirin SoC can have their bootloader unlocked unofficially via PotatoNV (Kirin 960 and older). Some Huawei devices using MediaTek SoC's can be unlocked with an unlocked seccfg and patched 32-bit Little Kernel. There is a payload that lets you do this: kaeru. For other devices, bootloader unlock has not been available since July 2018. All pre-2020 Huawei phones using the Kirin SoC, running EMUI 9.1.0 and older, can have their bootloader unlocked unofficially via various tools such as Kirin-Tool. Some Kirin 990 5G devices can be unlocked by flashing engineering bootloaders, as the fastboot images still retain the fastboot oem unlock command.	No
OPPO	Easy (MediaTek) or phones bought in mainland China; Medium (Snapdragon)	Only certain Snapdragon-powered OPPO phones can be unlocked without a third-party paid tool such as UnlockTool. Unlocking is possible on some MediaTek SoCs via MTKClient. Note that certain fastboot binaries have been removed, or locked by RSA key. MediaTek: MTKClient can be used for older devices, which sometimes requires using MTK bypass utility beforehand. This is unfeasible on modern Mediatek SoCs as they require a download agent file signed by the OEM and this file is not typically distributed. Any phones bought from mainland China and in depth-test's device support lists: Depth test regardless of SoC (the depth test app can be downloaded from OPPO's website). Command line using adb and fastboot.	Yes
HMD-Nokia	Medium (select models, e.g. Nokia 8); Impossible (Others)	Possible with unofficial unlocking methods	Yes
Vivo	Impossible as of May 2022.	N/A	Yes
LG	Hard	Possible by flashing engineering bootloaders, either using QFIL for newer devices or root for older ones (unofficial).	Yes
Tecno	Medium	Command-line. Requires Tecno ID account at least two weeks old.	No
Infinix	Medium	Command-line. Requires Inifinix ID account at least two weeks old.	No
Itel	Medium	Command-line. Requires Itel ID account at least two weeks old.	No
TCL	Medium (Ion V only) Unknown (others)	For the Ion V mobile phone, you can use a Python tool to reboot to a normally hidden fastboot.	No
Amazon	Medium	Command-line and unofficial. Requires using Linux to brick the device temporarily.	Yes

=== Shutdown of online services ===
In 2018, Huawei stopped providing bootloader unlock codes. On 31 December 2021, LG shut down its website which provided bootloader unlock tokens. In August 2023, ASUS removed the unlocking tool from its website and shut down the servers used to unlock the bootloader.

== History ==
The bootloaders of Nexus and Pixel devices can be unlocked with fastboot.

When Motorola released a bootloader unlocking tool for the Droid Razr, Verizon removed the tool from their models.

In 2011, Sony Ericsson released an online bootloader unlocking tool. Sony requires the IMEI number to be filled in on their website. For the Asus Transformer Prime TF201, Asus previously released a special bootloader unlock tool, up until 2023.

In 2012, Motorola released a limited tool for unlocking the bootloader of their devices; It required accepting terms and conditions and creating an account before the bootloader could be unlocked for your Motorola device.

A 2012 article by The Verge called the unlockable bootloaders a 'broken promise' and called for a fix.

HTC phones have an additional layer of lock called "S-OFF/S-ON".

Bootloaders can be unlocked using an exploit or using a way that the vendor supplied. The latter method usually requires wiping all data on the device. In addition, some manufacturers prohibit unlocking on carrier locked phones. Although Samsung phones and cellular tablets sold in the US and Canada do not allow bootloader unlocks regardless of carrier status, a service has allowed users on an earlier version to unlock their US/Canadian Samsung phone(s) and/or tablet(s).

In 2018, a developer from XDA Developers launched a service which allowed users to unofficially unlock the bootloader of some Nokia smartphone models. Similarly, another developer from XDA Developers launched a service to allow users to unofficially unlock the bootloaders of the US and Canada versions of the Samsung Galaxy S20 and Samsung Galaxy S21 phones.

Huawei announced plans to allow users to unlock the bootloader of the Mate 30 series, but later retracted that. Huawei has stopped providing bootloader unlock codes since 2018. A bootloader exploit named checkm30 has been developed for HiSilicon-based Huawei phones.

When the bootloader of the Samsung Galaxy Z Fold 3 was unlocked, the camera became less functional. This could be restored by re-locking the bootloader. This issue was later fixed by Samsung. For the Samsung Galaxy S22 series, before OneUI 8, unlocking the bootloader had no effect on the camera.

=== Others ===
==== Microsoft ====
The Windows Phone Internals tool is able to unlock bootloaders of all Nokia Lumia phones running Windows Phone, but not phones like the Alcatel Idol 4 or HP Elite x3. Version 1.0 was released in November 2015. In October 2018, the tool was released as open source software when the main developer René Lergner (also known as HeathCliff74) stepped down.

The slab bootloader used by Windows RT could be unlocked using a vulnerability, but was silently patched by Microsoft in 2016. UEFI Secure Boot on x86 systems can generally be unlocked.

==== Apple ====
The boot ROM protection on iOS devices with an A11 processor or older can be bypassed with a hardware exploit known as checkm8, which makes it possible to run other operating systems including Linux.

The bootloader on Apple Silicon-based Macs can be unlocked. However, other Apple devices like the iPhone and iPad cannot be bootloader unlocked even when using the same chip used in a Mac.

==== Google ====
The equivalent of bootloader unlocking is called developer mode in Chromebooks. Chromebooks use custom bootloaders that can be modified or overwritten by removing a Write-protect screw. Some models lack a screw and instead may or may not require disabling the onboard Cr50 chip.

In 2013, the bootloader of the Chromecast was hacked using an exploit. In 2021, it was hacked again for newer versions. In 2023, it was reported that the Chromecast HD could be unlocked without exploit.

==== Asus ====
Asus used to provide an unlocking tool for both of their smartphone lines, the Zenfone and ROG Phone. This worked as an installable .apk file that the user could install on their phone, then unlock the bootloader. The app worked by contacting Asus unlocking servers, then prompting the user to perform a factory reset.

In 2023 Asus removed the tool from their website and closed the unlocking servers, so even phones with the .apk file installed couldn't unlock their bootloaders. Representatives on the Asus forums claimed the tool would be available again, but as of March 2024 no additional information was provided, even after the release of their latest device the ROG Phone 8 and the previously upcoming release of the Zenfone 11 Ultra.

A user on the popular forum XDA filed a court claim application against Asus due to the unlock tool never being released and alleged that Asus censored comments about the unlock tool on their forum.

==== SpaceX ====
In August 2022, security researcher Lennert Wouters applied a voltage injection attack to bypass firmware verification of a Starlink satellite dish from SpaceX.

== Relocking ==
After unlocking a bootloader, some devices allow users to relock it. Relocking is typically done to restore the device to a factory-like state, often for warranty purposes or to re-enable certain security features like verified boot. This process is usually carried out through fastboot commands or manufacturer-specific software.

However, the ability to relock a bootloader varies significantly across manufacturers and device models. Some manufacturers provide official methods to relock the bootloader without issue, especially if the device is running official, signed firmware. In contrast, other devices may experience functionality issues after relocking—such as the loss of access to certain features or the risk of a "soft brick"—particularly if any system modifications remain or if unofficial firmware is installed.

Importantly, relocking the bootloader does not always reverse all changes made during the unlocking process. For example, some devices will retain a bootloader unlock flag or record in the hardware's tamper logs, which may still void warranties or affect access to services like DRM-protected content.

As a result, users are advised to consult manufacturer-specific guidelines and ensure that all system components are restored to their official state before attempting to relock the bootloader.

== See also ==
- Booting process of Android devices
- Odin
- Boot ROM § Security
- Rooting (Android)
