= Android recovery mode =

Mode on Android operating system for installing system updates and wipe data

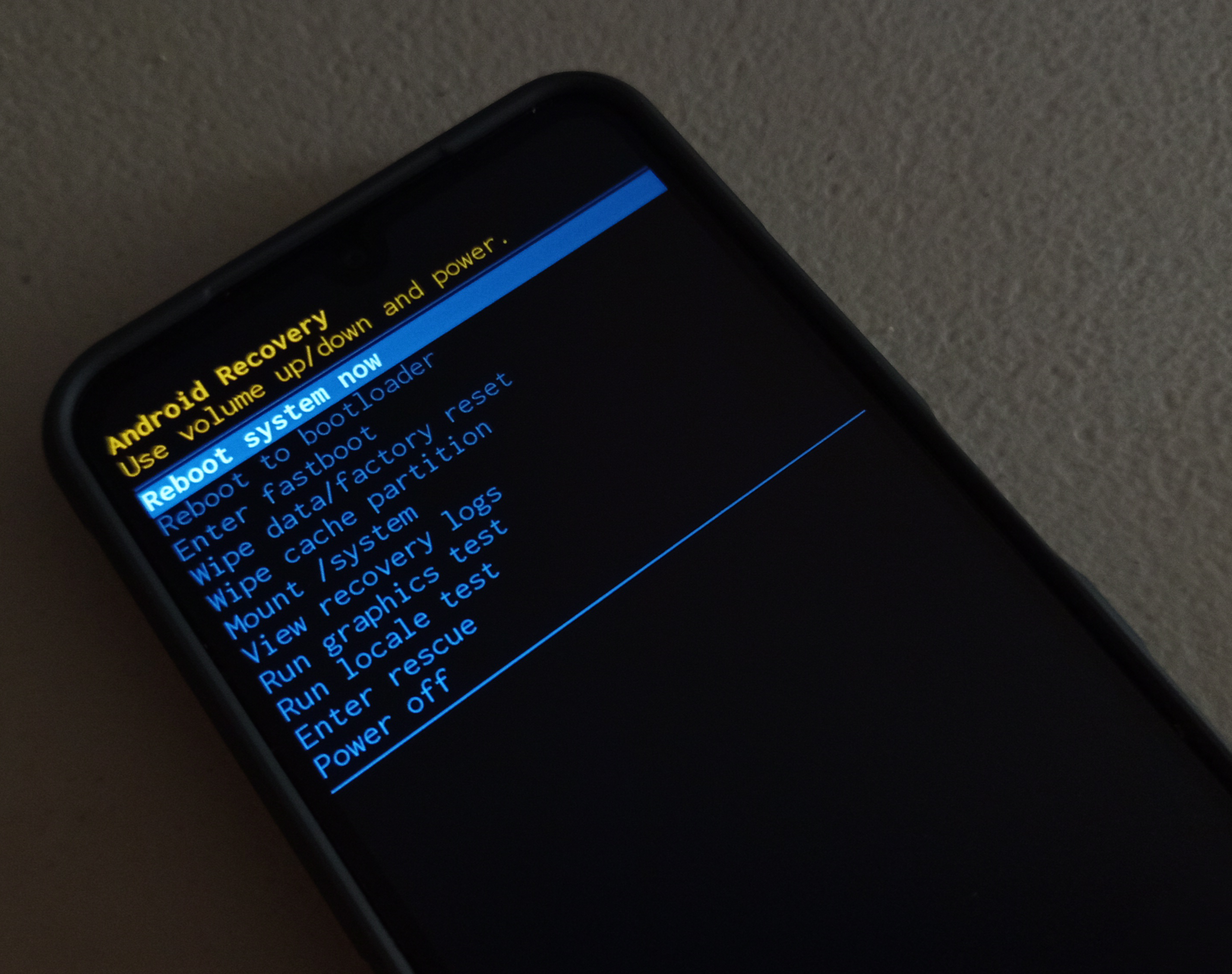
A Redmi A5 booted into recovery mode

Android recovery mode is a mode of Android used for installing updates and wiping data. It consists of a Linux kernel with ramdisk on a separate partition from the main Android system.

Recovery mode can be useful when a phone is stuck in a bootloop or when it has been infected with malware.

In 2026, Samsung removed a significant number of features from their recovery mode menu.

== Enablement ==
The way of entering recovery is different for every vendor.

Examples:

- Zebra and symbol devices: left scan/action button or PTT
- Nexus 7: Volume Up + Volume Down + Power
- Samsung Galaxy S3: Volume Up + Home + Power
- Motorola Droid X: Home + Power
- Samsung Galaxy A10s: Volume Up + Power

== Features ==
Features of the recovery mode usually include:

- Applying updates using the Android Debug Bridge
- Applying updates from the SD card
- Hard resetting
- Mounting partitions
- Running a system test

== Custom recovery ==
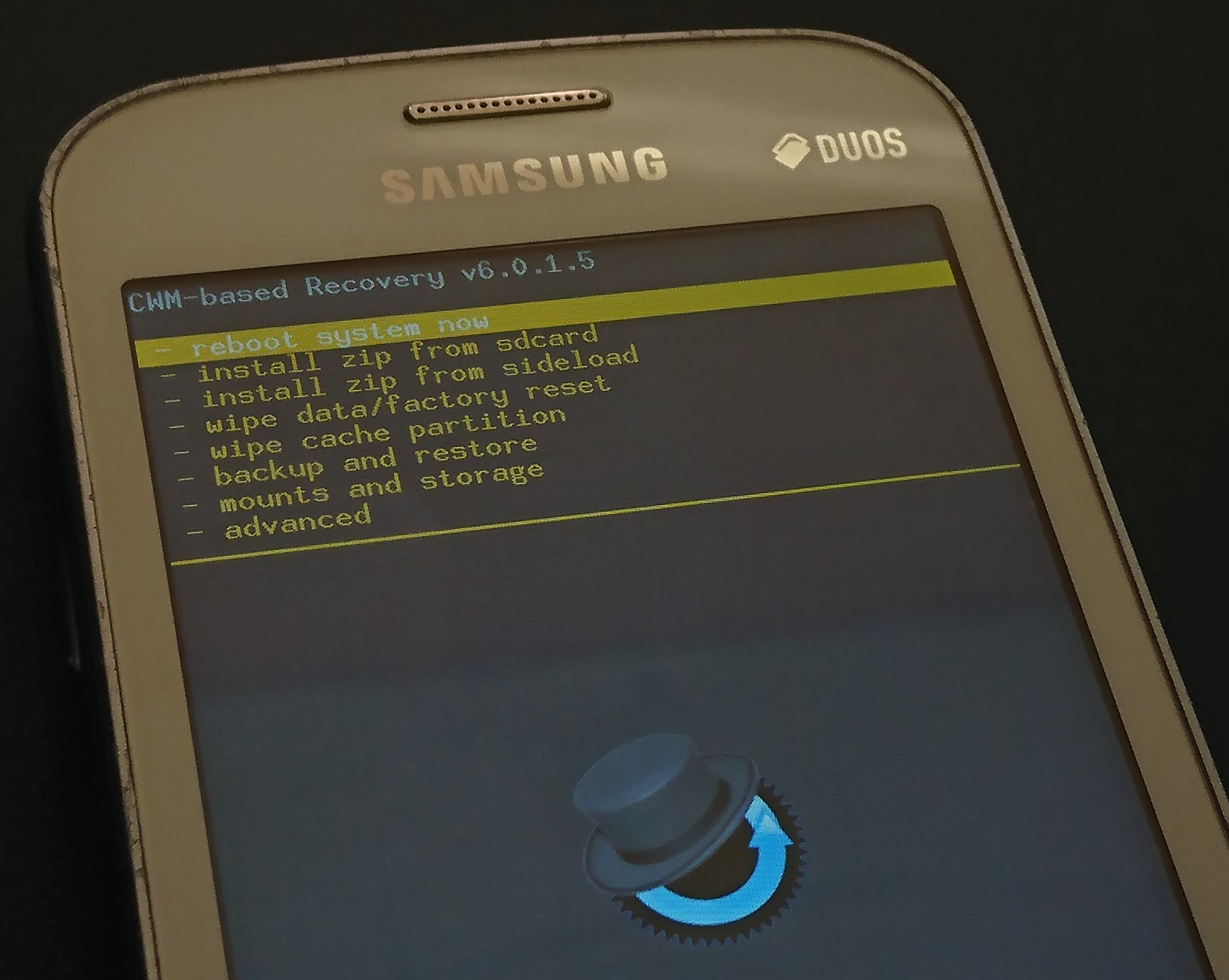
A Samsung Galaxy Trend Lite, booted into ClockWorkMod Recovery

The pre-installed recovery mode on Android can be replaced by other software, such as TWRP or OrangeFox. It can include features such as:

- Full backup and restore functionality
- Applying unsigned update packages
- USB mass storage access to SD cards
- Full ADB access, with ADB running as root

== See also ==
- Bootloader unlocking
- Qualcomm EDL mode
