= Brick (electronics) =

Non-functioning electronic device

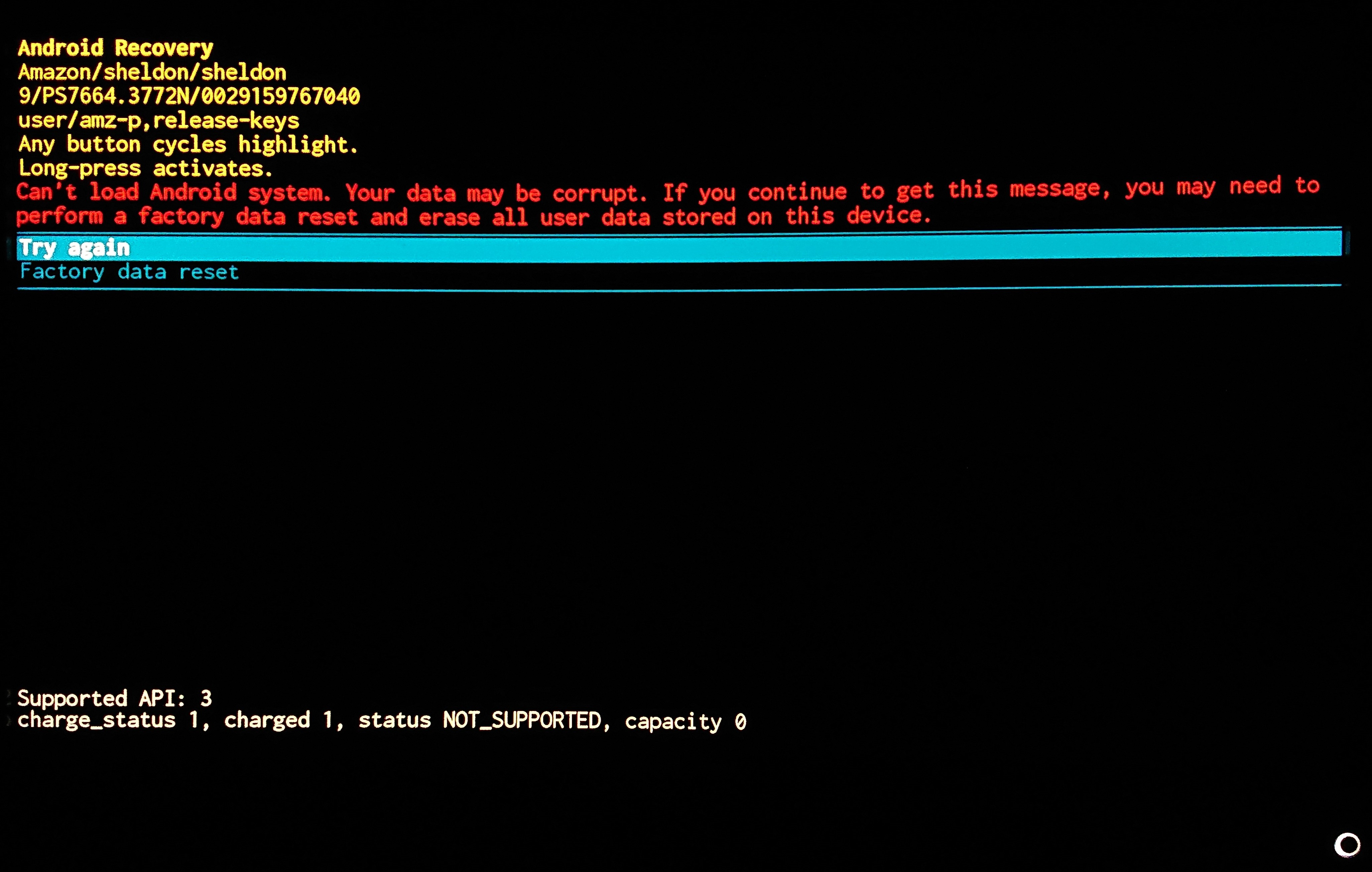
A soft bricked Fire TV Stick, booting in emergency recovery and telling the user that the /data partition got corrupted, and requiring a factory reset in order to make it usable again

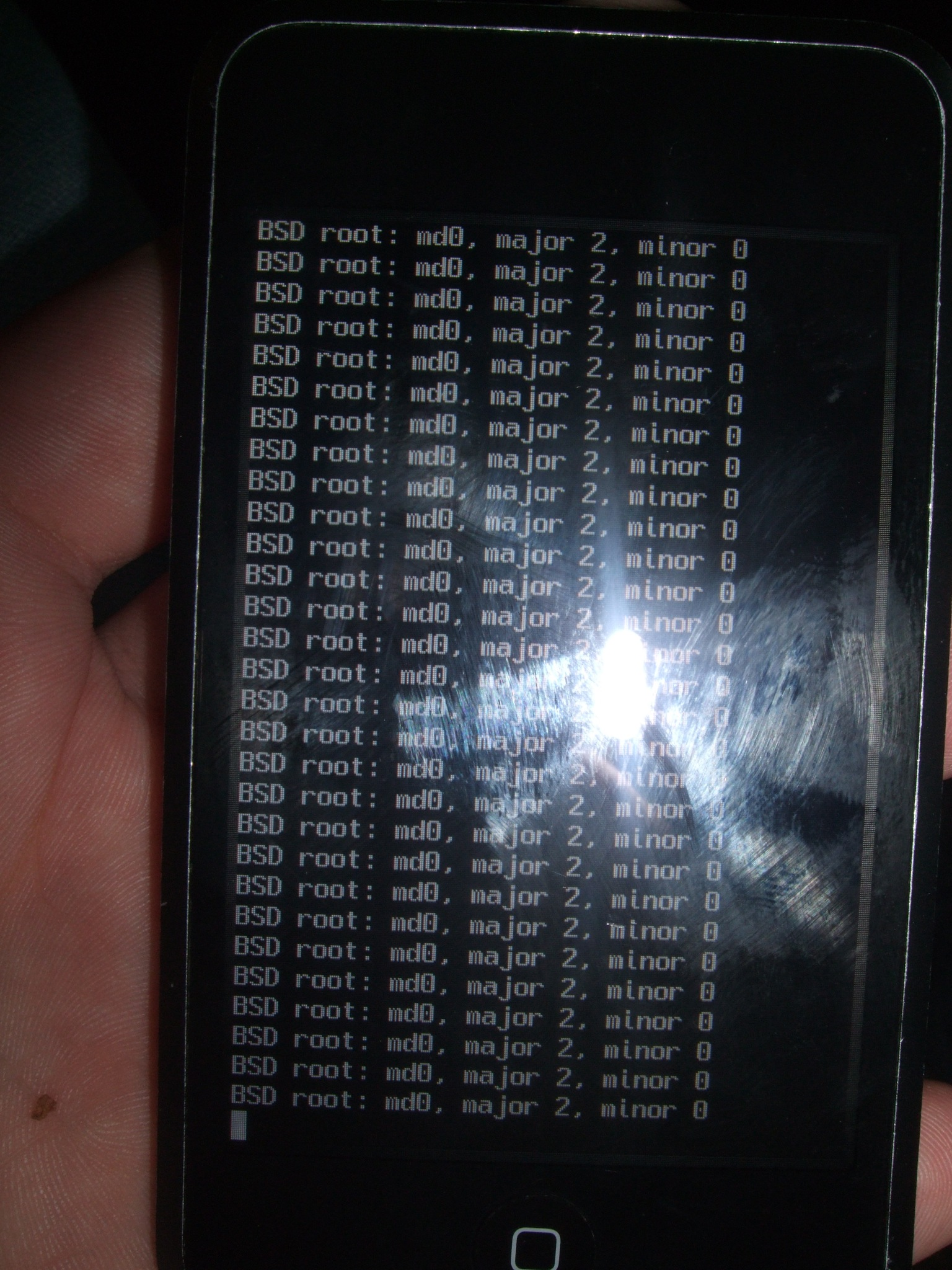
A soft bricked iPod Touch, displaying only file system related messages, most likely due to a failed jailbreak

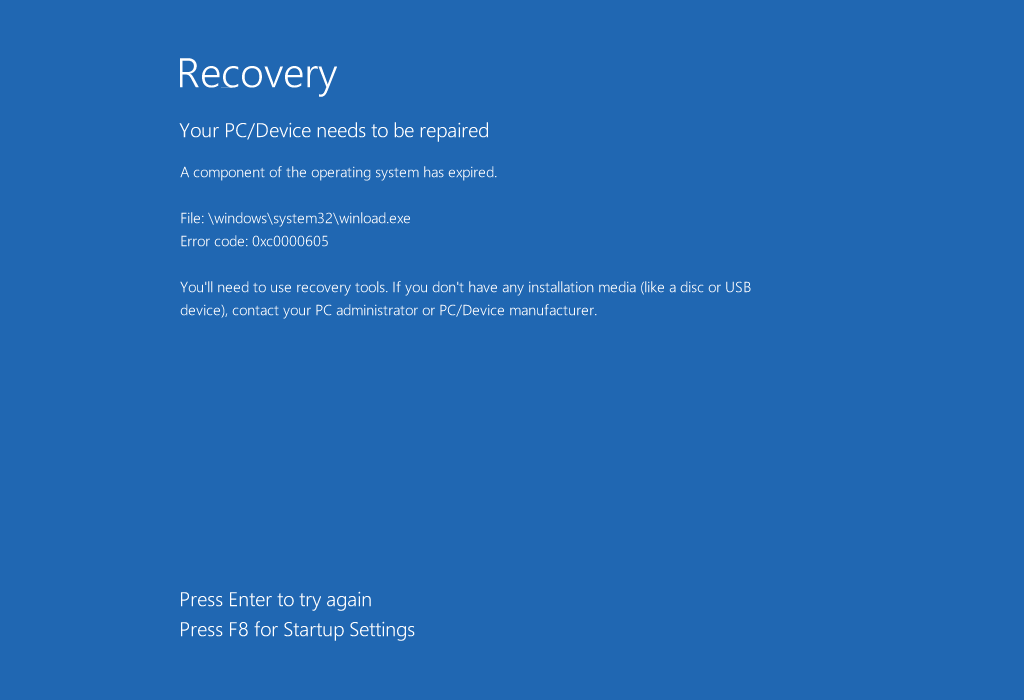
A soft bricked Windows 10 flight-signed build, displaying error messages from the boot manager

A brick (or bricked device) is an electronic device, specially consumer electronics (such as a mobile device, game console, computer, etc.) that is no longer functional. It could be due to corrupted firmware, failed operating system, a hardware problem, or other damage. The term is an analogy to a construction brick and its lack of modern technological usefulness. "Brick" is also used as a verb to describe a device entering such a state.

== Cause and prevention ==
Bricking a device is most often a result of interrupting an attempt to update the device. Many devices have an update procedure which must not be interrupted before completion; if interrupted by a power failure, user intervention, or any other reason, the existing firmware may be partially overwritten and unusable. The risk of corruption can be minimized by taking all possible precautions against interruption. Bricking a device may also be done intentionally as punishment for severe transgressions involving its use, but this is exceptionally rare and typically only done as a last resort.

Installing firmware with errors, or for a different revision of the hardware, or installing firmware incompetently patched such as DVD firmware which only plays DVDs sold in a particular region, can also cause bricking.

Devices can also be bricked by malware (malicious software) and sometimes by running software not intentionally harmful but with errors that cause damage.

Some devices include a backup copy of their firmware, stored in fixed ROM (Read Only Memory) or writable non-volatile memory, which is not normally accessible to processes that could corrupt it. Should the firmware become corrupted, the device can copy from the backup memory to its main memory, restoring the firmware.

If the NAND flash memory (usually in the SSD, eMMC or eUFS form) of the device is life exhausted, the device may be bricked, as it may not boot to the operating system.

== Types ==
Bricking is classified into two types, hard and soft, depending on the device's ability to function.

=== Soft brick ===
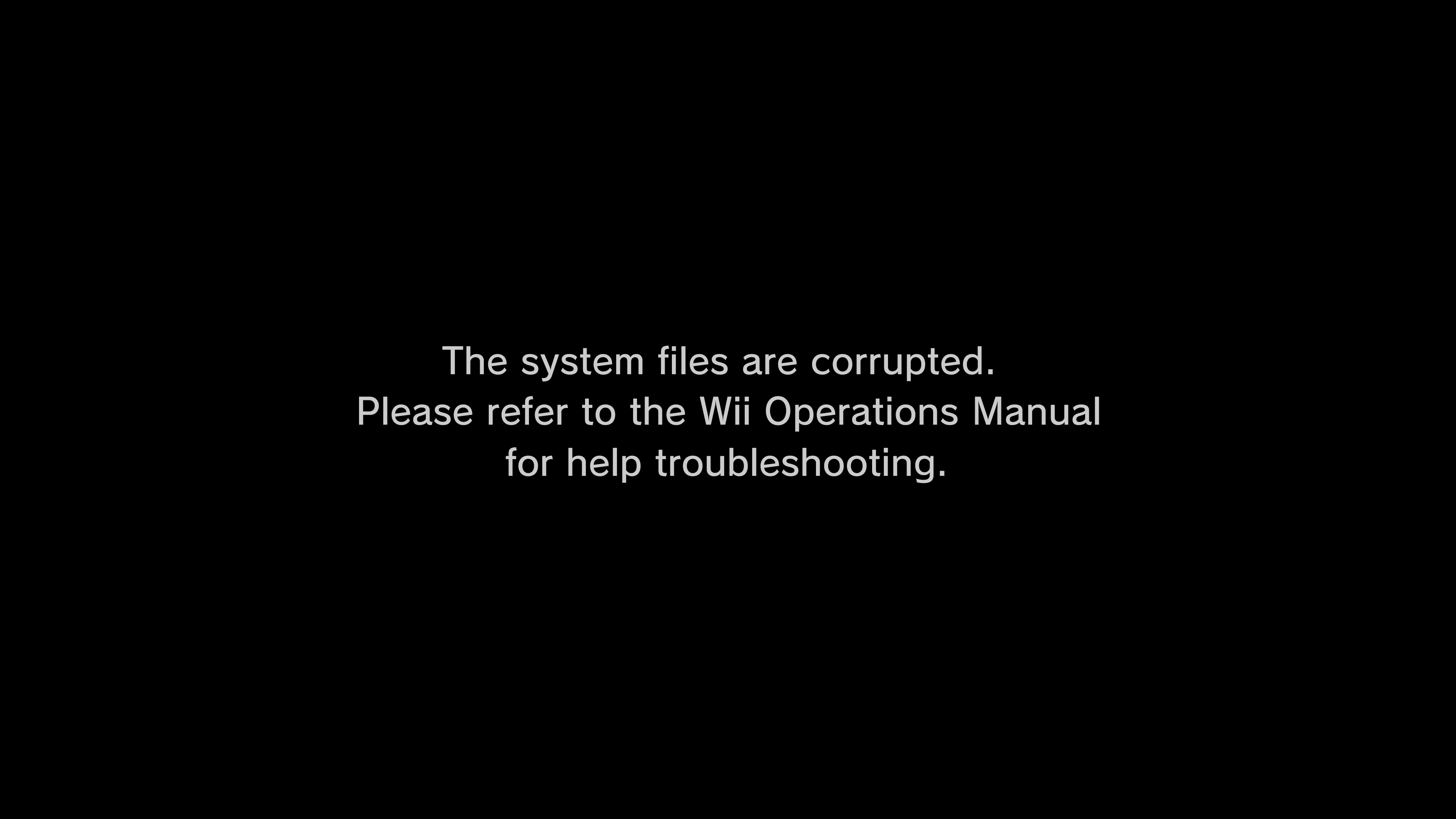
A soft bricked Wii, showing the "System files are corrupted" message

A "soft bricked" device may show signs of life, but fails to boot or may display an error screen. Soft bricked devices can usually be fixed relatively easily; for example, a soft bricked iOS device may display a screen instructing the user to plug it into a computer to perform an operating system recovery using iTunes computer software. In some cases, soft bricked devices are unable to be repaired without physical repairs being carried out; an example of this would be an iOS device locked with iCloud Activation Lock, of which the only solution is to contact the owner of the iCloud account the device is locked to, or to replace either some integrated circuits or the entirety of the logicboard with a non-locked board.

Most devices can be soft bricked in a variety of ways. Resolution where possible generally follows a process of analyzing the boot process, determining the sub-type of soft brick, and making changes with the help of external (non-bricked) devices.

=== Hard brick ===
Hard bricked devices generally show few or no signs of life. A bricked device may not power on at all, or it may power on, but never boot to the OS or firmware, the closest getting to a warning screen.

Some kernel bugs have been known that affect the /data partition in the eMMC chip, which becomes corrupted during certain operations such as wiping and flashing on some Android devices. Another example of a hard brick was related to a UEFI firmware bug which could allow users to run rm on the EFI system variables mounted to the filesystem from within the operating system, resulting in a bricked bootloader that would require ROM soldering tools to repair. This bug was addressed by Linux developers in 2016.

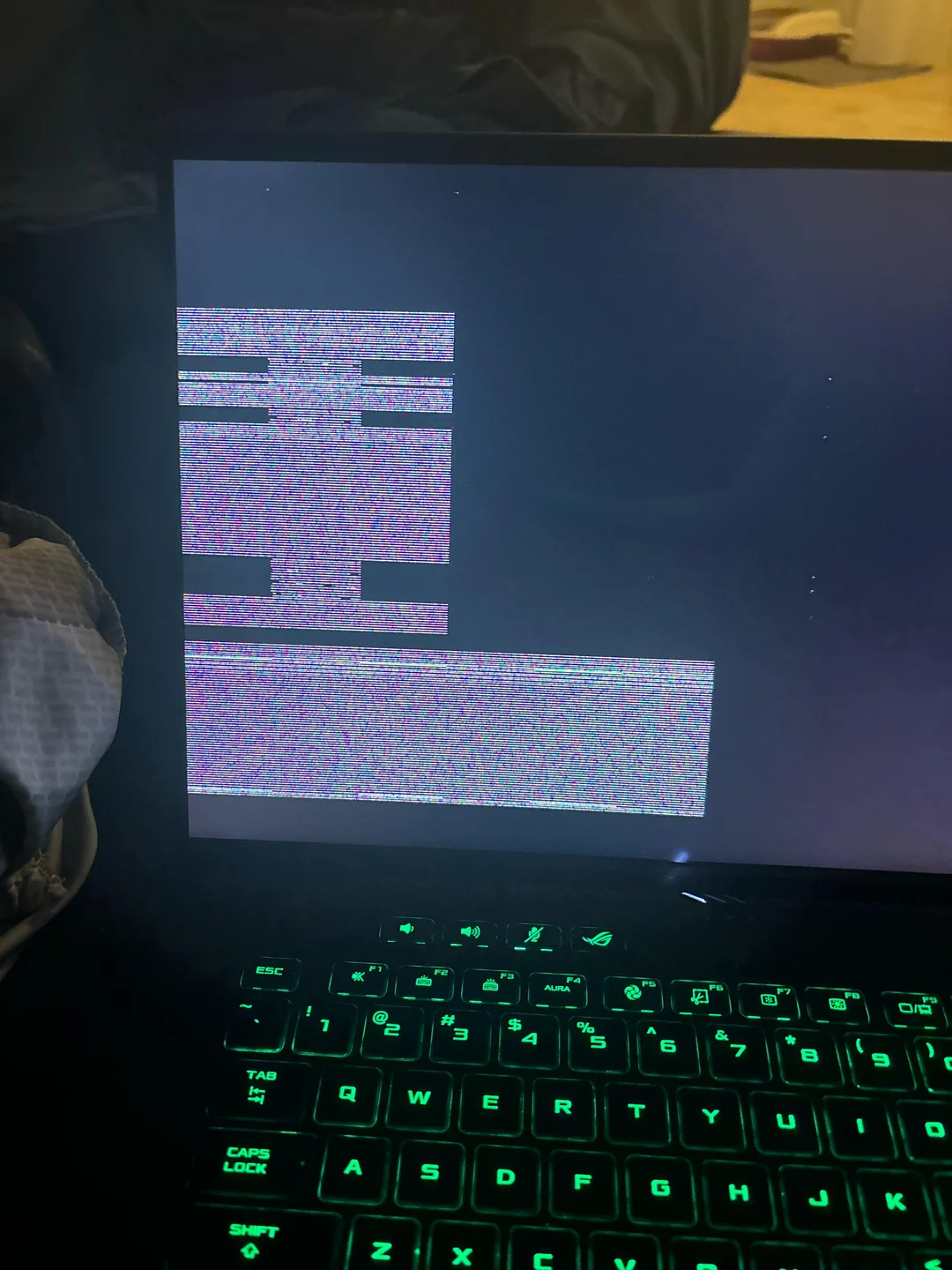
An image depicting a hard-bricked laptop with a bricked BIOS, displaying only colored static shapes

Recovering from a hard brick is generally considered difficult or impossible and requires the use of a more direct programming interface to the device; such an interface often exists, as there must be a way to program the initial firmware during the manufacturing process. However, additional tools or connections may be needed, such as low-level programming devices. Hardware hard brick recoveries are also considered difficult and require electrical knowledge to find and fix hardware issues. For example, an overloaded capacitor in a circuit may explode, thus stopping the flow of electricity and bricking the device. More complex examples involve permanent damage to integrated circuits and processors. Fixing such hardware bricks involve replacing these components entirely or fixing them by either bypassing if the circuit allows or other methods.

== Un-bricking ==
Some devices that become "bricked" because the contents of their nonvolatile memory are incorrect can be "un-bricked" using separate hardware (a debug board) that accesses this memory directly. This is similar to the procedure for loading firmware into a new device when the memory is still empty. This kind of "bricking" and "un-bricking" occasionally happens during firmware testing and development. In other cases software and hardware procedures, often complex, have been developed that have a good chance of un-bricking the device. There are also user-created modifier programs to use on bricked or partially bricked devices to make them functional. Examples include the Wiibrew program BootMii used to fix semi-bricked Wiis, or the Odin program used to flash firmware on Samsung Android devices, or the fastboot Android protocol which is capable of re-flashing a device with no software installed. For some Apple operating systems, such as iPadOS and IOS, unbricking the device may require reflashing the operating system on a secondary device, normally MacOS.

== Systems ==
In principle any device with rewritable firmware, or certain crucial settings stored into flash or EEPROM memory, can be bricked. Many, but not all, devices with user-updatable firmware have protection against bricking; devices intended to be updated only by official service personnel generally do not.

Amongst devices known to have bricking issues are: older PCs (more recent models often have dual BIOSes, or other form of protection especially automatically backup the BIOS file to the EFI system partition), many mobile phones, handheld game consoles like the PlayStation Portable and Nintendo DS, video game consoles like the Wii, Xbox 360, PlayStation 4, and Xbox One, many SCSI devices and some lines of hard disk drives and routers.

Electric cars such as the Tesla Roadster (first generation) can brick if the battery is completely discharged.

Sometimes an interrupted flash upgrade of a PC motherboard will brick the board, for example, due to a power outage during the upgrade process. It is sometimes possible to un-brick such a motherboard, by using a similar BIOS chip to boot from floppy. Then it will be possible to retry the flash process. Sometimes it is possible to boot from a floppy, then swap the old presumably dead BIOS chip in and re-flash it. On some Gigabyte boards, it can also be possible to re-flash the bricked main BIOS using a backup BIOS. Some vendors put the BIOS chip in sockets, allowing the corrupted BIOS chip to be removed and reprogrammed using an external tool, like a universal programmer or an Arduino.

== Online and mobile services ==
Mobile phones have a fixed identification code, the IMEI. A telephone reported stolen can have its IMEI blocked by networks, preventing them from being used as mobile devices. iOS offers a similar "Activation Lock" feature via the "Find My iPhone" security software, where a device can be remotely prevented from operating (even after it has been erased), protected by the owner's Apple ID.

Devices that have a strong dependency on online services in order to function may be bricked after services are discontinued by the manufacturer, or some other technological factor (such as expired security certificates or other services quietly becoming unavailable) effectively prevents them from operating. This can happen if the product has been succeeded by a newer model and the manufacturer no longer wishes to maintain services for the previous version, or if a company has been acquired by another or otherwise ceases operations, and chooses not to, or is no longer able to maintain its previous products. For example, Apple dropped support for OS X El Capitan in October 2018, and on 30 September 2021 the built-in security certificate expired, rendering users unable to connect to or use any iCloud services. The security certificate issued with the final updates of OS X Sierra and High Sierra expired on 20 May 2022. The practice has especially been scrutinized within the Internet of things and smart home markets. Bricking in these cases has been regarded as a means to enforce planned obsolescence.
