= Qualcomm EDL mode =

Feature on Qualcomm-based SoCs

The Qualcomm Emergency Download mode, commonly known as Qualcomm EDL mode and officially known as Qualcomm HS-USB QD-Loader 9008 is a feature implemented in the boot ROM of a system on a chip by Qualcomm which can be used to recover bricked smartphones. On Google's Pixel 3, the feature was accidentally shown to users after the phone was bricked.

== Device support ==
For a device to support EDL it must be using Qualcomm hardware. The Snapdragon family is very widely used.

== Access ==
=== ADB ===
The Android Debug Bridge can be utilized to get access to EDL mode, with the command adb reboot edl.

=== Windows ===
The Qualcomm Product Support Tool (QPST) is normally used internally by service center executives for low-level firmware flashing to revive Android devices from a hard-brick or to fix persistent software issues. To flash the firmware, the tool communicates with supported devices via EDL. The QPST has not been officially released by Qualcomm.

=== Linux ===
Qualcomm Download (QDL) is a tool to communicate with Qualcomm System On a Chip bootroms to install or execute code. The source code is maintained by Bjorn Andersson also known as andersson.

=== Test points ===
Qualcomm implemented motherboards that always include a test point. These can vary between phone models. Generally, test points are a pair of contacts, which can be some way apart. EDL can be accessed by opening the back of the phone, finding the location of the test point, which depends on the model, and using a pair of metal tweezers to short the connectors and boot the phone into EDL. Further software tools are needed for actions in EDL mode.

=== EDL Deep Flash Cable ===
Qualcomm implemented a feature in motherboards with the presence of EDL, where they can be booted to EDL via an EDL Deep Flash Cable. This specific cable has a button present in the cable, to be able to make the phone boot into EDL mode when pressed, by shorting D+ and GND usb lines. With the use of the cable, in most devices and cases, it will not be necessary to use the test points. The cable also works on hard-bricked devices to boot them into EDL mode, this method works only if SBL1/XBL (Secondary BootLoader 1/eXtended BootLoader) isn’t corrupted.
