= Unlock (song) =

"UNLOCK"

Single by KAT-TUN

from the album KAT-TUN 10th Anniversary Best "10Ks"
- A-side: "Unlock"
- B-side: Ame ni Saku Ai, Yoru ni Naku Ai (LE 1); Greatest Journey (LE 2/ RE); Honesty (RE); JET (RE)
- Released: 2 March 2016
- Genre: J-Pop
- Length: 3:35
- Label: J-One Records/J-Storm
- Songwriters: KAHLUA, Manabu Marutani, Tobias Granbacka, Command Freaks
- Producer: Johnny H. Kitagawa

KAT-TUN singles chronology
"Tragedy" (2016)	"UNLOCK" (2016)

UNLOCK is the 26th single released by the Japanese idol group KAT-TUN. It was released on March 2, 2016 under the label J-One Records/J-Storm.

== Overview ==
=== Single Information ===
"UNLOCK" is the twenty-sixth single by KAT-TUN and the last one released before they entered the temporary hiatus period. This is also KAT-TUN's last single as a four-member group due to Junnosuke Taguchi's withdrawal from the group and the agency.

The single was released in four versions: Limited Edition 1 and 2, Regular Edition and the "Kaitō Yamaneko" edition. The Limited Edition 1 includes the song "Unlock", the B-side song titled "Ame ni Saku Ai, Yoru ni Naku Ai" and the promotional video and making of "Unlock". The Limited Edition 2 includes the song "Unlock", another B-side song titled "Greatest Journey" and the promotional video and making of "Greatest Journey". The regular edition contains the same songs in Limited Edition 2, its original karaoke versions and two more songs, "Honesty" and "Jet". The "Kaitō Yamaneko" version includes the title song "Unlock" and its karaoke version.

=== Media Tie-up ===
The title song "Unlock" was the theme song for the NTV Saturday drama series titled "Kaitō Yamaneko" starring Kazuya Kamenashi. The coupling song "Greatest Journey" was the theme song for KAT-TUN's variety show in TBS titled "KAT-TUN Sekaiichi Tame ni Naru Tabi.

== Promotions ==
As part of the promotions for the drama series, a "Kaitō Yamaneko" version has been released, with the original poster of the drama as its cover and a coaster enclosed as a bonus. There is also a user code for mobile and smart phone users enclosed in this version which was used to download three versions of "Yamaneko" standby screens for a limited time only.

For the other three versions, there were bonuses included as well. There is a 16-page lyrics booklet enclosed for the Limited Edition 1 and an 8-page lyric booklet for the Limited Edition 2. Another bonus included in this single are the photo name cards. In every version of the single, excluding the Kaitō Yamaneko version, one KAT-TUN photo name card is enclosed which was randomly selected from the 15 types available. And for the early-bird pre-order bonus, B2-sized posters were also included for each version.

== Track listings ==
=== Limited Edition 1 ===
CD

1. UNLOCK (3:35)
  Lyrics: KAHLUA
  Music: Manabu Marutani, Tobias Granbacka, Command Freaks
  Arrangement: Command Freaks
2. Ame ni Saku Ai, Yoru no Naka Ai (雨に咲く哀,夜の泣く藍) (4:05)
  Lyrics: FOREST YOUNG
  Music: Janne Hyoty, Teemu Lillrank, KOUDAI IWATSUBO
  Arrangement: Janne Hyoty, Eiji Kawai

DVD

1. UNLOCK (music video + Making of)

=== Limited Edition 2 ===
CD

1. UNLOCK
2. Greatest Journey (3:03)
  Lyrics: NOYCE'
  Music: Nai-T
  Arrangement: Eiji Kawai

DVD

1. Greatest Journey (Music Video + Making of)

=== Regular Edition ===
CD

1. UNLOCK
2. Greatest Journey
3. Honesty (4:14)
  Lyrics: 25→graffiti
  Music: King of slick・Andrew Choi
  Arrangement: King of Slick
4. JET (3:25)
  Lyrics: RUCCA
  Music: Andreas Carlsson, Markus Bogelund, TKMZ
  Arrangement: Markus Bogelund
5. UNLOCK (Original Karaoke)
6. Greatest Journey (Original Karaoke)

=== Kaitō Yamaneko Edition ===
CD

1. UNLOCK
2. UNLOCK (Original Karaoke)

== Chart performance ==
"UNLOCK" has sold over 194,000 copies in its first week, reaching the top spot of the Oricon Weekly CD Singles Chart. This feat makes "UNLOCK" as the 26th consecutive number-one single that KAT-TUN has released ever since their CD debut in 2006, placing the group in second place after KinKi Kids record of 35 consecutive number one singles.

The single has ranked at number 29 in Oricon's Annual Sales Ranking for 2016 for selling over 217,454 copies and has received the Gold certification from the Recording Industry Association of Japan.
