= Fastboot =

Recovery mode included in Android mobile operating system

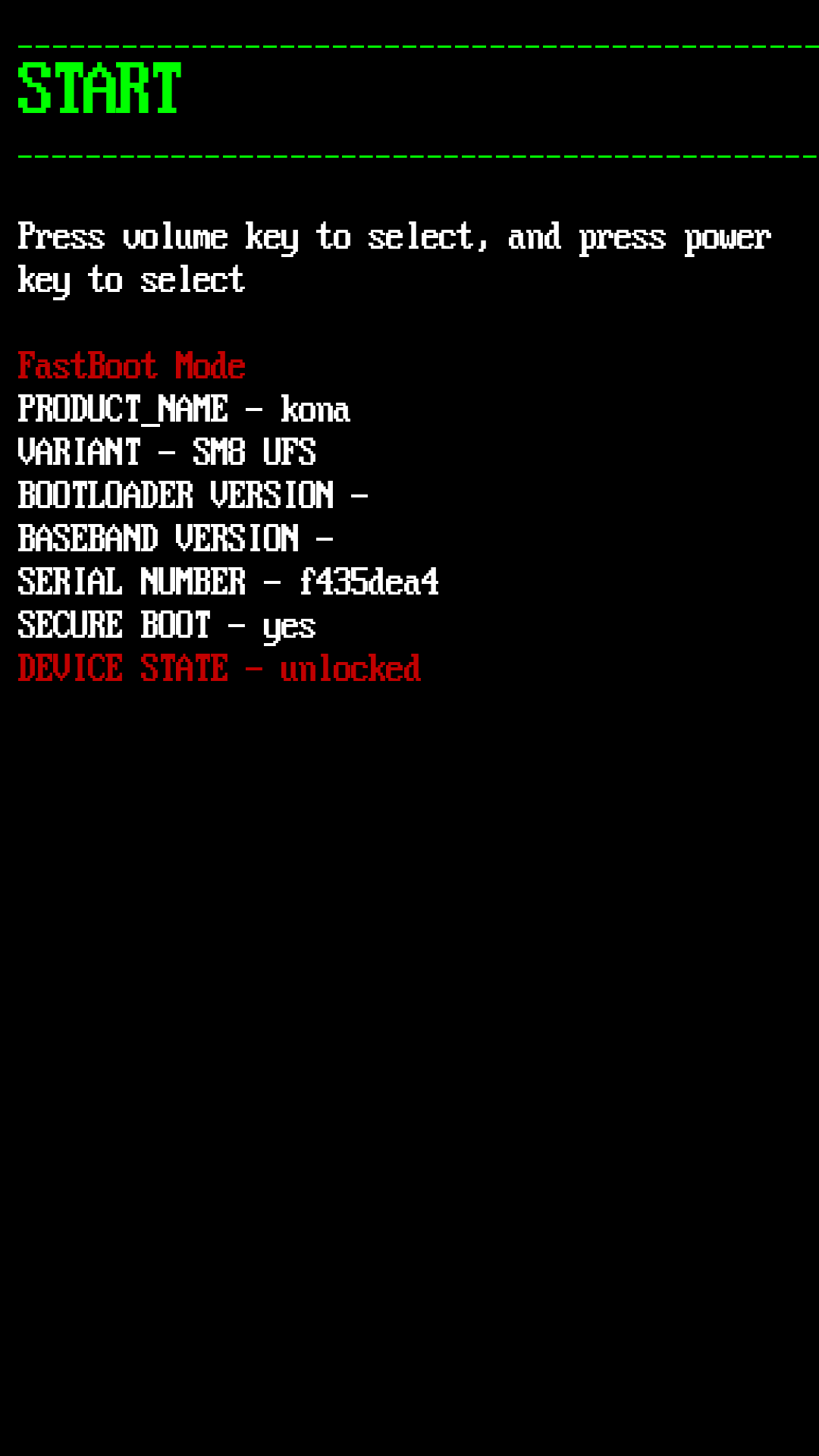
- Fastboot text-based user interface
- Original author: Google LLC
- Repository: android.googlesource.com
- Included with: Android SDK
- Available in: C++
- Type: Firmware communication protocol and implementation thereof

Fastboot is a communication protocol used primarily with Android devices. It is implemented in a command-line interface tool of the same name and as a mode of the bootloader of Android devices. The tool is included with the Android SDK package and used primarily to modify the flash filesystem via a USB connection from a host computer. It requires that the device be started in Fastboot mode. If the mode is enabled, it will accept a specific set of commands, sent through USB bulk transfers. Fastboot on some devices allows unlocking the bootloader, and subsequently, enables installing custom recovery image and custom ROM on the device. Fastboot does not require USB debugging to be enabled on the device. To use fastboot, a specific combination of keys must be held during boot.

Not all Android devices have fastboot enabled, and Android device manufacturers are allowed to choose if they want to implement fastboot or some other protocol.

== Keys pressed ==
The keys that have to be pressed for fastboot differ for various vendors.

- HTC, Google Pixel, Motorola, and Xiaomi: Power and volume down
- Zebra and symbol devices: Right scan/action button
- Sony: Power and volume up
- Google Nexus: Power, volume up and volume down

On Samsung devices, (excluding the Nexus S and Galaxy Nexus devices), power, volume down and home has to be pressed for entering ODIN mode. This is a proprietary protocol, and tool, as an alternative to fastboot. The tool has a partial alternative.

== Commands ==
Some of the most commonly used fastboot commands include:

- flash – rewrites a partition with a binary image stored on the host computer.
- flashing unlock/oem unlock DEVICE_SPECIFIC_UNLOCK_KEY – unlocks an OEM locked bootloader for flashing custom/unsigned ROMs.
- flashing lock/oem lock DEVICE_SPECIFIC_LOCK_KEY – locks an OEM unlocked bootloader.
- erase – erases a specific partition.
- reboot – reboots the device into either the main operating system, the system recovery partition or back into its boot loader.
- devices – displays a list of all devices (with the serial number) connected to the host computer.
- format – formats a specific partition; the file system of the partition must be recognized by the device.
- oem device-info – checks the bootloader state.
- getvar all – displays all information about device (IMEI, bootloader version, battery state etc.).

== Implementations ==
The fastboot protocol has been implemented in the Android bootloader called ABOOT, the Little Kernel fork of Qualcomm, TianoCore EDK II, and Das U-Boot.

== See also ==
- Bootloader unlocking
- Android recovery mode
- Thor (protocol)
- DFU (Device Firmware Upgrade mechanism)
