= Odin (firmware flashing software) =

Utility software developed by Samsung

- Odin 3.14 running on a Windows 11 machine, with a device ready for flashing plugged in
- Developer: Samsung Electronics

Stable release(s)
- Windows: v3.14.1 / February 16, 2020; 6 years ago
- Linux (Odin4): v1.2.1-dc05e3ea / June 3, 2022; 4 years ago
- Written in: C++
- Operating system: (v3) Windows (v4) Linux
- Available in: English

Odin is a utility software program developed and used by Samsung internally which is used to communicate with Samsung devices in Odin mode (also called download mode) through the thor protocol. It can be used to flash a custom recovery firmware image (as opposed to the stock recovery firmware image) to a Samsung Android device. Odin is also used for unbricking certain Android devices. Odin is the Samsung proprietary alternative to Fastboot.

There is no account of Samsung ever having officially openly released Odin, though it is mentioned in the developer documents for Samsung Knox SDK and some documents even instruct users to use Odin. Some other docs on Knox SDK reference "engineering firmware", which presumably can be a part of the Knox SDK along with Odin. Publicly available binaries are believed to be the result of leaks. The tool is not intended for end-users, but for Samsung's own personnel and approved repair centers.

== Usage ==
Although none of the publicly available downloads are authorized by Samsung itself, XDA-Developers consider the files offered on their Forum the safest option. For the usage of Odin, the phone needs to be in Download mode. For this, some key combination need to be pressed, such as Power + Volume Down + Home, or Power + Volume Down + Bixby, or connect to a computer while performing the Volume Up + Volume Down key combination.

In 2026, Samsung started requiring to enable the Maintenance mode in the system settings before it is possible to access download mode.

The thor protocol that Odin implements is used in many Samsung devices, including in some devices co-developed by Google and Samsung like the Galaxy Nexus. There is also an implementation of the thor protocol in Das U-Boot.

== Heimdall ==
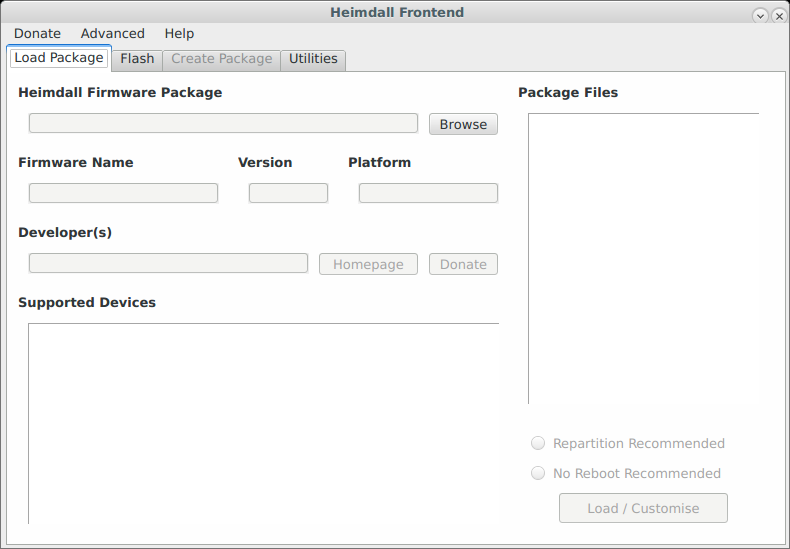
Graphical user interface for Heimdall running on Ubuntu

Heimdall is a free/libre/open-source, cross-platform replacement for Odin which is based on libusb. Heimdall can be used on , Linux, macOS, and Windows. The name Heimdall, like Odin, is an allusion to Norse mythology; both Odin and Heimdall are among the deities of the Norse pantheon. It can be used either through the command line or with its graphical user interface.
