= Samsung Knox =

Proprietary security framework by Samsung

Samsung Knox is a mobile device management (MDM) and trusted computing framework pre-installed on most Samsung mobile devices, and implements ARM TrustZone in hardware. It allows the management of work devices, such as employee mobile phones, interactive kiosks, and barcode scanners. Like other MDMs, Knox allows organizations to control a device's pre-loaded applications, settings, boot-up animations, home screens, and lock screens.

== Overview ==
Knox provides trusted computing and mobile device management (MDM) features. Knox's hardware is based on an implementation of ARM TrustZone, a bootloader ROM, and secure boot (similar to dm-verity and AVB). These trusted computing environments are used to store sensitive data, like cryptographic materials and certificates.

MDM allow businesses to customize their devices for their needs. IT administrators can register new devices, identify a unified endpoint management (UEM) system, define the organizational rules that govern the use of devices, and upgrade device firmware over-the-air. Knox's MDM services are registered and accessed through the web, APIs, or proprietary SDKs.

A few Samsung devices with Knox were approved for US governmental use in 2014, as long as they're not used to store classified data.

Since Android 8, Knox is used to prevent root access to apps even after a successful rooting.

In October 2014, a security researcher discovered that Samsung Knox stores PINs in plain text rather than storing salted and hashed PINs and processing them by obfuscated code.

In May 2016, Israeli researchers Uri Kanonov and Avishai Wool found three vulnerabilities in specific versions of Knox.

Several security flaws were discovered in Knox in 2017 by Project Zero.

=== e-Fuse ===
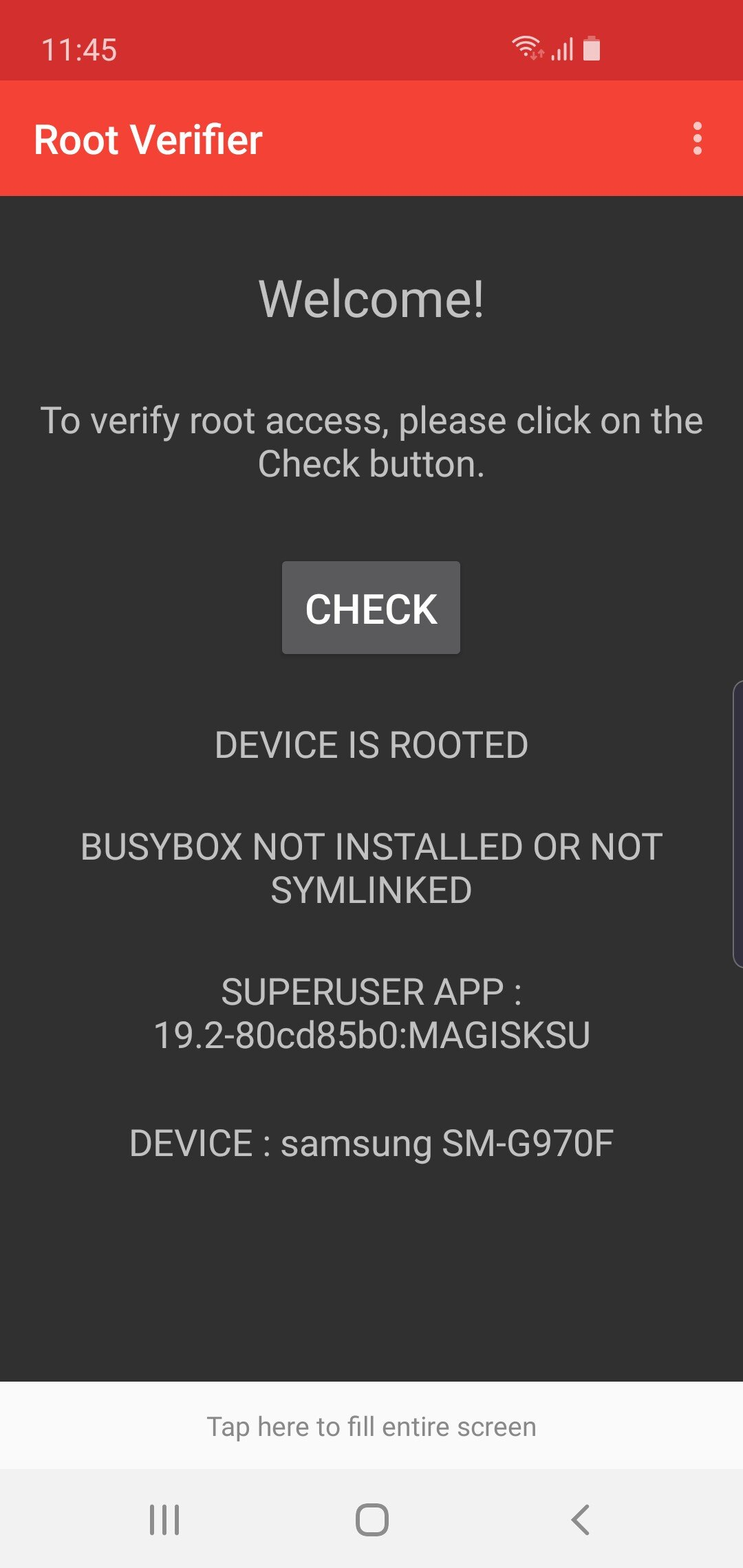
Rooted Samsung Galaxy S10e with tripped e-fuse

Samsung Knox devices use an e-fuse to indicate whether or not an "untrusted" (non-Samsung) boot path has ever been run. The e-Fuse will be set in any of the following cases:

- The device boots with a non-Samsung signed bootloader, kernel, kernel initialization script, or data.
- The device is rooted.
- Custom firmware is detected on the device (such as non-Samsung's official Android releases like OneUI images patched with Magisk by the user or custom ROMs like LineageOS).

When set, the text "Set warranty bit: <reason>" appears. Once the e-fuse is set, a device can no longer create a Knox Workspace container or access the data previously stored in an existing Knox Workspace. In the United States, this information may be used by Samsung to deny warranty service to devices that have been modified in this manner. Voiding consumer warranties in this manner may be prohibited by the Magnuson–Moss Warranty Act of 1975, at least in cases where the phone's problem is not directly caused by rooting. In addition to voiding the warranty, tripping the e-fuse also prevents some preinstalled apps from running, such as Secure Folder and Samsung Pay. For some older versions of Knox, it may be possible to clear the e-fuse by flashing a custom firmware.

== AI and Privacy ==
Galaxy AI was first introduced on the Galaxy S24 series and later expanded to the Galaxy S25 series and foldable models such as the Samsung Galaxy Z Fold 7 and Samsung Galaxy Z Flip 7. On these devices, Samsung uses Knox as the security platform for selected Galaxy AI features. These features use on-device processing components, including the Personal Data Engine, which creates personalized outputs from data stored locally on the device. Information used or generated by these functions is saved in Knox Vault, a hardware-backed secure environment designed to keep sensitive data separate from the main operating system. Some Galaxy AI features that operate across multiple Samsung devices use encrypted communication channels provided by Knox. Users can also choose settings that limit cloud AI processing or require features to run only on the device. In enterprise environments, administrators using Knox Manage or other Knox tools can turn specific Galaxy AI features on or off, or restrict them based on organizational policies.

== See also ==
- SafetyNet API
- Intel Management Engine
- BlackBerry DTEK
- Windows Defender
