= Redmi 2 =

Smartphone model

Xiaomi Redmi 2

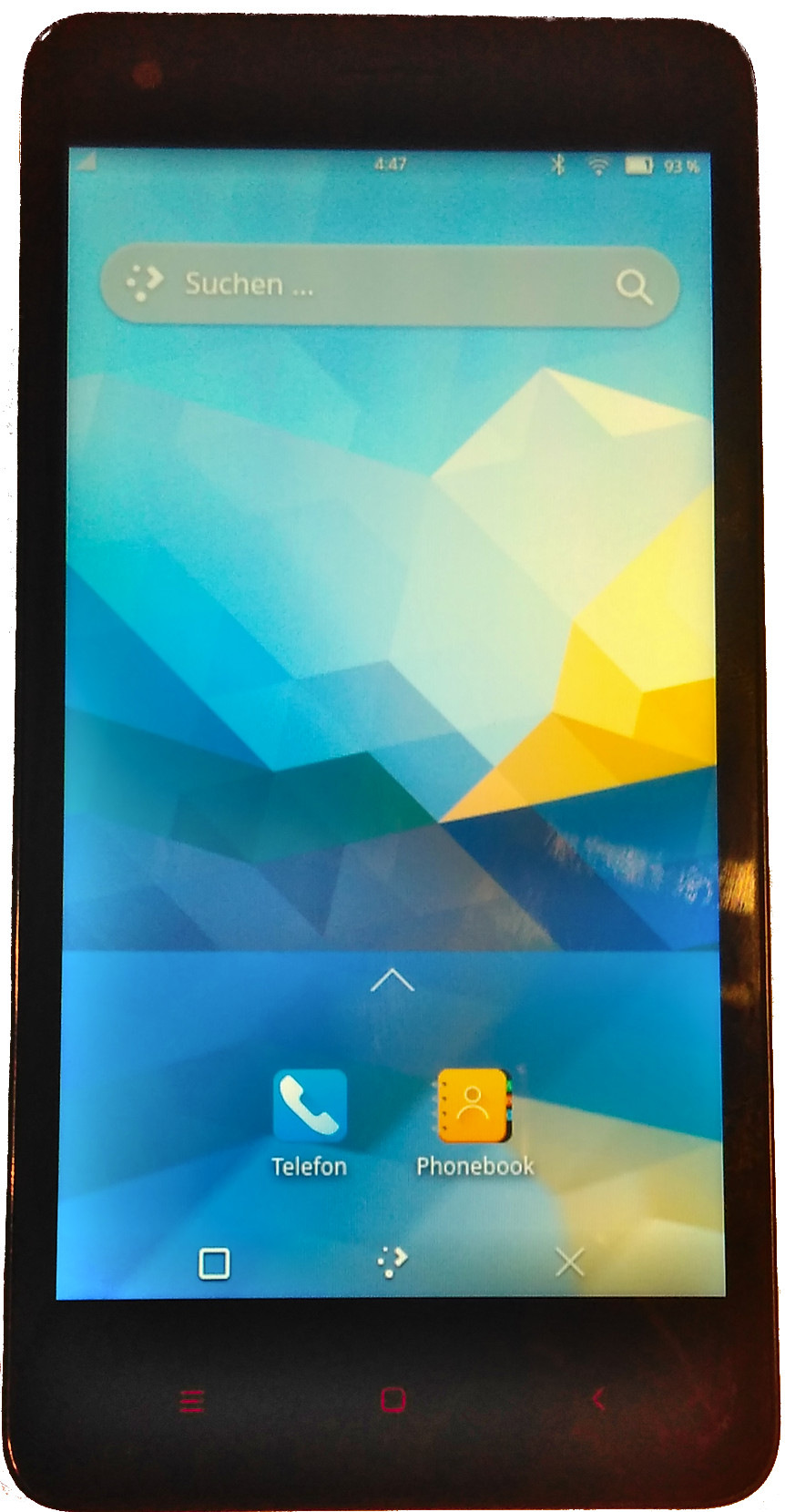
- Redmi 2
- Brand: Xiaomi
- Manufacturers: Xiaomi, Wingtech
- Type: Smartphone
- Series: Redmi
- First released: January 2015; 11 years ago
- Predecessor: Redmi 1S
- Successor: Redmi 2 Prime (Revision), Redmi 3
- Form factor: Slate
- Operating system: MIUI 6 based on Android v4.4 KitKat
- System-on-chip: 1.2 GHz Qualcomm Snapdragon 410 MSM8916
- CPU: Quad Core ARMv8 1.2 GHz
- GPU: Adreno 306 GPU
- Memory: 1GB or 2GB
- Storage: 8GB or 16GB
- Removable storage: Up to 32GB
- Battery: 2200 mAh
- Rear camera: 8 Megapixel, BSI, f/2.2, Full HD video recording
- Front camera: 2 megapixels, f/2.0, HD video recording
- Display: 1280 x 720 pixel, 4.7 inch IPS Display (312ppi)
- Data inputs: Multi-touch capacitive touchscreen; Accelerometer; A-GPS; Digital compass; Proximity sensor; Push buttons; capacitive touch-sensitive buttons
- Codename: wt86047, wt88047

Xiaomi Redmi 2 is a smartphone produced by Xiaomi released in January 2015. It is the successor to the Xiaomi Redmi 1 family.

== Specifications ==
=== Software ===
The Redmi 2/Prime comes preinstalled with Android 4.4 KitKat with the proprietary MIUI 6 custom graphical user interface, it can be upgraded to MIUI 9 based on Android 4.4 KitKat (for Redmi 2) and Android 5.1 Lollipop (for Redmi 2 Prime) via OTA. The Redmi 2 comes with a factory-unlocked bootloader, allowing users to "root" the device and install custom firmware.

The software-development community has released custom ROMs and kernels for the phone, even though the official kernel sources from Xiaomi were only released a year after launch. The Redmi 2 has achieved unofficial stable builds of CyanogenMod 11 (based on Android 4.4), 12.1 (Android 5.1) and official nightly builds of CyanogenMod 13.0 (Android 6.0.1) and CyanogenMod 14.1 (Android 7.1.1). Development of the latter version is continued in the LineageOS project after CyanogenMod's discontinuation. From LineageOS builds Redmi 2 is currently getting official nightly builds of LineageOS 17.1 (Based on Android 10). Redmi 2 has also achieved official stable builds of Resurrection Remix (based on Android 7.1.2, Android 8.1), official nightly builds of AOKP (based on Android 8.1), official stable builds of MoKee 6 (based on Android 6.0.1), MoKee 7 (based on Android 7.1.2), MoKee 8 (based on Android 8.1), official nightly builds of MoKee 9 (based on Android 9.0.0) and official builds of Mokee 10 (based on Android 10).

=== Hardware ===
The Redmi 2 is powered by a 1.2 GHz Snapdragon 410 SoC with Adreno 306 graphics engine. It features 1 GB of RAM and 8 GB of storage. The Redmi 2S, also called Redmi 2 Enhanced or Prime (depending on locale), has 2 GB of RAM and 16 GB of storage. The display is a 4.7-inch IPS panel with touch capabilities, 1280×720 resolution at a density of 312 ppi with scratch-resistant AGC Dragontrail glass.

=== Parts Providers ===
- Processor: Qualcomm
- Modem: Qualcomm
- PMIC: Qualcomm
- Wifi/Bluetooth: Qualcomm
- Connectivity: Qualcomm
- Audio: Qualcomm
- RAM: Samsung, Micron, Elpida
- Storage: Samsung, Micron, Toshiba
- Display panel: Sharp, AUO, BOE, EBBG
- Touch: Focaltech, Atmel
- Camera: Samsung, OmniVision
- Battery: Coslight, Sunwoda

=== Variants ===
Redmi 2 was updated with two models, namely Redmi 2 Prime (India) and Redmi 2 Enhanced (China), with 2 GB of RAM and 16 GB of storage, twice that of the standard model. There were several variants of the standard and upgraded model for different markets, with varying baseband support.

Model number	Name	Features	Target market
2014811	Redmi 2 / Prime (HM2XWCPro/wt88047)	LTE/WCDMA/GSM	China
2014812		CDMA variant	China
2014813	Redmi 2 / Enhanced (HM2XTDPro/wt86047)	additional support for TDD-LTE, TD-SCDMA	China
2014815			Hong Kong, South Asia
2014816	红米2A高配版 (Redmi 2a High Spec)	High Spec of version of Redmi 2A	China
2014817			South Africa, Indonesia, Philippines and Singapore, Hong Kong
2014818	Redmi 2 / Prime (HM2LTE)	LTE 2 GB/16 GB Variant	India
2014819			Brazil, Indonesia

== Successor ==
The Xiaomi Redmi 3 was announced in January 2016 as a successor to the Xiaomi Redmi 2.
