= Xposed Framework =

Software framework for rooted Android devices

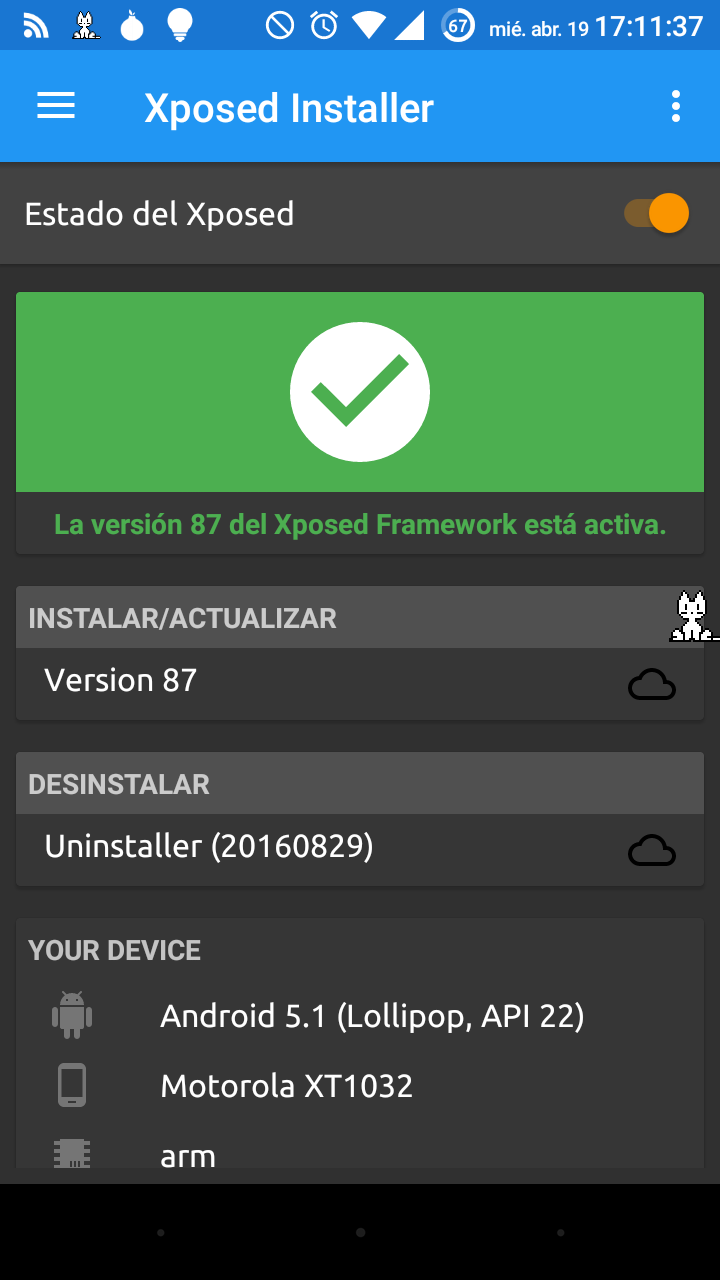
- Screenshot The official installer for the Xposed framework
- Original author: Robert Vollmer (rovo89)
- Release: March 31, 2012; 14 years ago
- Final release: v89 / December 17, 2017; 8 years ago
- Preview release: v90-beta3 / January 29, 2018; 8 years ago
- Written in: C++, Java
- Operating system: Android
- Platform: Android
- Successor: EdXposed, LSPosed, Vector
- License: Apache License 2.0
- Website: https://api.xposed.info/
- Repository: github.com/rovo89/Xposed (Core); github.com/rovo89/XposedBridge (API); github.com/rovo89/XposedInstaller (Manager)

Xposed Framework is a free and open-source software hooking framework for rooted Android devices. It enables runtime modification of system and application behavior without altering original APK files or flashing custom ROMs. Modifications are delivered through "modules", which are separate apps that hook into Android system methods.

Created by rovo89 and first released in 2012, the framework became popular in Android modding for its modular design. Official development ended around Android Oreo due to increased security and platform restrictions, with successors like LSPosed and Vector continuing its functionality.

== History ==
The Xposed Framework was first released on 31 March 2012, as a proof-of-concept on the XDA Developers forums. The framework grew out of rovo89's earlier work modding ROMs without requiring users to flash a full custom ROM, and it quickly attracted a following on XDA Developers, one of the largest Android enthusiast communities.

In 2013, version 2.2 introduced an integrated module repository, allowing users to more easily discover and install modifications directly within the application.

In 2014, with the release of Android 5.0 (Lollipop), Google transitioned from the Dalvik runtime to the Android Runtime (ART). This caused major compatibility challenges for Xposed and required substantial redevelopment to remain functional; the framework was unusable on Lollipop devices for several months while rovo89 reworked its internals, a gap that was closely followed by Android enthusiast press at the time.

Support for later Android releases followed a similar pattern of lengthy delays and unofficial, community-built interim ports before rovo89 issued official builds: an official release for Android Nougat arrived in October 2017 after more than a year of work, and a beta for Android Oreo followed roughly three months later, in January 2018.

== Architecture ==
Android applications are launched from a system process called Zygote. Xposed hooks into this process so that every app spawned can be intercepted and modified.

=== Dalvik-based implementation ===
On older Android versions (up to 4.4), Xposed modified the system app-launching process by replacing the core system binary. This enabled it to load a custom bridge library during startup. Method hooking was implemented by intercepting Java method calls and redirecting them to Xposed's handler, which allowed module code to run before, after, or in place of the original method execution.

=== ART transition ===
From Android 5.0 onward, Android switched to the ART runtime, which compiles apps ahead-of-time into native code. This made the original approach unusable. Xposed was adapted to hook into ART's internal libraries, modifying method entry points or forcing interpreted execution paths to regain control over method calls.

=== Components ===
The framework is split into three distinct technical layers to ensure stability and ease of development:

1. Xposed: Written in C++, handles process injection and low-level runtime interaction.
2. XposedBridge: Java API used by developers to define hooks without dealing with native code.
3. Xposed Installer: Android application used to manage framework installation and modules.

=== Modules ===
Modules are independent Android applications that use the Xposed API to modify behavior of other apps or system components. They can alter UI elements, system features, permissions, or app logic without modifying the original application package.

== Use in security research ==
Beyond end-user customization, the Xposed Framework has seen significant use in academic and professional security research. Researchers have used it as a dynamic instrumentation platform for analyzing Android applications at runtime, including work on detecting privacy leakage in third-party libraries embedded within apps. Security professionals have also used Xposed modules to perform penetration testing tasks such as bypassing SSL certificate pinning and root detection in Android applications.

== Successors ==
Increasing restrictions in Android (notably SELinux enforcement, Verified Boot, and ART hardening) made direct modification of system partitions increasingly impractical. This led to a shift toward systemless implementations based on runtime injection frameworks integrated with Magisk.

=== EdXposed ===
EdXposed is a compatibility layer that provides Xposed module support on modern Android systems using Magisk and the Riru framework. It reimplements the Xposed API while avoiding direct modification of the system partition, enabling a systemless installation approach.

=== LSPosed ===
LSPosed is a successor to EdXposed and it supports Zygisk only (Magisk's built-in replacement for Riru). It introduced the LSPlant hooking framework, enabling scoped injection so modules are loaded only into explicitly targeted applications rather than all processes, improving efficiency and isolation and LSPosed official development has been resumed in 2026 and it got updated to 2.X to support modern tools and modern libxposed api

=== Vector ===
Vector is a fork of LSPosed focused exclusively on Zygisk-based environments. It continues the LSPosed ecosystem following the original project's 2024 pause and it's updated to support modern Android versions.

== Non-root implementations ==
Several "Xposed-compliant" frameworks allow for module support without root access. These implementations operate at the application level rather than the system level, using virtualization or binary modification.

=== LSPatch ===
LSPatch is a non-root framework derived from LSPosed that enables Xposed module support by statically modifying Android apps to embed the Xposed loader, allowing modules to run when the app starts.

=== VirtualXposed ===
VirtualXposed is a non-root sandboxing solution that runs apps and Xposed modules inside an isolated environment. It applies hooks within this container so modules only affect virtualized apps.

== See also ==
- Magisk (software)
- Rooting (Android)
- Android Runtime
