= Lewa =

Lewa may refer to:

- A traditional Baluch folk dance in Pakistan
- LEWA, a manufacturer from Germany that produces diaphragm metering pumps, process pumps as well as customized metering systems and production units
- Lewa Wildlife Conservancy
- LeWa OS, a Chinese Android ROM
- Lewa, the Toa Nuva of Air (formerly Toa Mata) in the Lego Bionicle toy series
- A nickname for Polish footballer Robert Lewandowski
