= Bhar (disambiguation) =

Bhar, BHAR, or variants could refer to:

- Bhar, a caste
- Bhar (surname), a surname
- Black Holes and Revelations, a 2006 album by Muse
- BharOS, a mobile operating system

== See also ==
- Rajbhar, another caste
