= AOKP =

Mobile operating system

- Developer: Team Kang
- Written in: C (core), C++ (some third party libraries), Java (UI)
- OS family: Embedded operating system (Linux/Android)
- Source model: Open source
- Initial release: Ice Cream Sandwich 4.0 (Maguro)
- Latest release: 9
- Marketing target: firmware replacement for Android mobile devices
- Available in: English, Catalan, Traditional Chinese, Simplified Chinese, Dutch, Finnish, French, German, Italian, Japanese, Korean, Polish, Portuguese, Russian, Spanish, Swedish, Turkish
- Package manager: Google Play / APK
- Supported platforms: ARM
- Kernel type: Monolithic, Linux kernel modified
- Default user interface: Stock Android UI
- License: Apache License 2 (Android UI) GNU General Public License v2 (Linux Kernel)
- Official website: aokp.co

AOKP, short for Android Open Kang Project, is a discontinued open-source replacement distribution for smartphones and tablet computers based on the Android mobile operating system. The name is a play on the word kang (slang for stolen code) and AOSP (Android Open Source Project). The name was a joke, but it stuck. It was started as free and open-source software by Roman Birg based on the official releases of Android Open Source Project by Google, with added original and third-party code, features, and control.

Although only a portion of the total AOKP users elect to report their use of the firmware, as of September 2013, it is used by more than 3.5 million devices around the world.

== Features ==
AOKP allows users to change many aspects of the OS including its appearance and its functions. It allows customizations normally not permitted by the factory firmware.

- LED control: The color and pulsing of the notification LED can be custom set for various applications.
- Navigation ring: Actions can be assigned to the navigation ring, to allow for quicker access applications.
- Ribbon: Allows users to use swipe gestures anywhere and enables a system-wide custom application shortcuts and actions.
- Vibration patterns: Users can build custom vibration patterns to be assigned to notifications from certain applications or calls from certain people.
- Native theme support: Themes, downloaded from the Google Play Store or from other sources, can be applied to give a modified appearance to the device interface. AOKP now features Substratum support.
- Customization of the hardware and software buttons, including track skip/flashlight while the screen is off, PIE control and the ROM's unique Fling navigation system
- UI control, including colour strokes and background blue
- Status bar customization, such as battery icon stylization and network activity
- Power menu customization
- Notification and quick settings configurations, such as how many toggles are displayed on the quick settings header at a time

== Release versions ==
AOKP builds/releases are provided on a milestone and nightly schedule:

Milestones: Most stable builds which are usually released once a month. However, milestone builds have not been released for several years and the AOKP team appears to just release nightlies as of Nougat builds.

Nightlies: Automatic builds every 3 days with the latest code committed but may contain bugs

To be notified of new releases, users can get the AOKPush application that uses the Google Cloud Messaging (GCM) service provided by Google to immediately receive push notifications when a build is complete and ready to download. With AOKPush, users also get the available test builds and random messages from the developer team. GCM is integrated into the Android framework so the application does not wake up the device periodically to fetch data nor use extra battery. There are also devices that would rely on AOKP to get latest android update.

== Firmware history and development ==
Not long after the introduction of the HTC Dream (named the "T-Mobile G1" in the United States) mobile phone in September 2008, a method was discovered to attain privileged control (termed "root access") within Android's Linux-based subsystem. Having root access, combined with the open source nature of the Android operating system, allowed the phone's stock firmware to be modified and re-installed onto the phone.

In the following years, several modified firmware releases for mobile devices were developed and distributed by Android enthusiasts. One, maintained by a developer named Roman Birg of AOKP, quickly became popular among several high-end Android mobile owners. AOKP started in November 2011 and quickly grew in popularity, forming a small community of developers called the AOKP Team (also known as "Team Kang"). Within a few months, the number of devices and features supported by AOKP escalated, and AOKP quickly became the second most popular Android firmware distributions, CyanogenMod being the first.

AOKP is developed using a distributed revision control system with the official repositories hosted on GitHub like many other open source projects. New features or bug fix changes made by contributors are submitted using Google's source code review system, Gerrit. Contributions may be tested by anyone, voted up or down by registered users, and ultimately accepted into the code by AOKP developers.

In early 2020 AOKP Developers posted a blog outlining parity with LineageOS upstream. "Device support will be a bit different this time around. We can support any device that is getting Lineage 16.0 builds. We just need a maintainer to test builds and maintain a forum thread."

2011

- AOKP Ice Cream Sandwich (ICS) Android 4.0.X

2012

- AOKP Jelly Bean (JB) Android 4.1.X

2013

- AOKP Jelly Bean (JB-MR1) Android 4.2.X
- AOKP Jelly Bean (JB) Android 4.3.X

2014

- AOKP KitKat Android 4.4.X

2014

- AOKP Lollipop Android 5.0.x

2015

- AOKP Marshmallow Android 6.0.1

2016

- AOKP Nougat Android 7.0
- AOKP Nougat Android 7.1.x

2017

- AOKP Oreo Android 8.0
- AOKP Oreo Android 8.1

2020

- AOKP Pie Android 9.0

== Supported devices ==
ASUS

- Nexus 7 (2013) WiFi
- Nexus 7 (GSM)
- Nexus 7 (WiFi)
- Asus ZenFone 2(ZE551ML)

BQ

- Aquaris E5 4G

Elephone

- P9000

HTC

- One (Intl. / AT&T / T-Mobile) – Legacy Builds
- One (Generic GSM / Sprint / Verizon)
- One XL (AT&T)

Huawei

- Ascend Mate 2 4G
- Nexus 6P

Lenovo

- Vibe K5 (A6020)

LG

- G PAD 8.3
- G2 (GSM – LTE / AT&T / Sprint / T-Mobile / Verizon)
- Nexus 4
- Nexus 5
- Nitro HD (AT&T)
- Optimus (LTE)
- Spectrum (LTE)

Motorola

- Droid 3 (XT862)
- Droid 4 (XT894)
- Droid Bionic (XT875)
- Droid Razr (GSM / XT910 • VZW / XT912)
- Moto X(T-Mobile / Verizon Dev Version)
- Moto G4 Plus

Oppo

- Find 5
- N1

Samsung

- Galaxy Nexus (GSM / Sprint / Verizon)
- Galaxy Note 2 (GSM – LTE / AT&T / Sprint / T-Mobile / Verizon)
- Galaxy Note 3 LTE (Unified)
- Galaxy S2 (Intl. Exynos, Intl. Omap / T-Mobile)
- Galaxy S3 (Intl. / AT&T / T-Mobile / US Cellular / Verizon)
- Galaxy S3 LTE (Unified)
- Galaxy S4 (C Spire / Cricket / C Sprint / T-Mobile / US Cell / Verizon)
- Galaxy S4 LTE (Unified)
- Galaxy S4 Mini (GT-I9190 (3G) / GT-I9192 (DS) / GT-I9195 (LTE))
- Galaxy S5 (GSM / Sprint / US Cell / Vodafone)
- Nexus 10
- Vibrant (T-Mobile)

Sony

- Xperia SP
- Xperia T
- Xperia Tablet Z (LTE / WiFi)
- Xperia V
- Xperia Z
- Xperia Z Ultra
- Xperia Z1
- Xperia Z1 Compact
- Xperia Z2
- Xperia ZL
- Xperia ZR

OnePlus

- One
- 2
- 3
- X

YU

- Yuphoria
- Yureka / Yureka Plus

Xiaomi

- Mi 3
- Mi 4
- Mi Note 2
- Redmi 1S
- Redmi Note 3
- Redmi Note 4
- Redmi 5 Plus

== See also ==
- List of custom Android firmware
- Android rooting
- Comparison of mobile operating systems
