= Magisk =

Magisk can refer to:

- Magisk (software), an Android modification tool
- Magisk (gamer), a professional Counter-Strike: Global Offensive player
