= Redmi 1S =

2014 Android Smartphone developed by Xiaomi

Xiaomi Redmi 1S

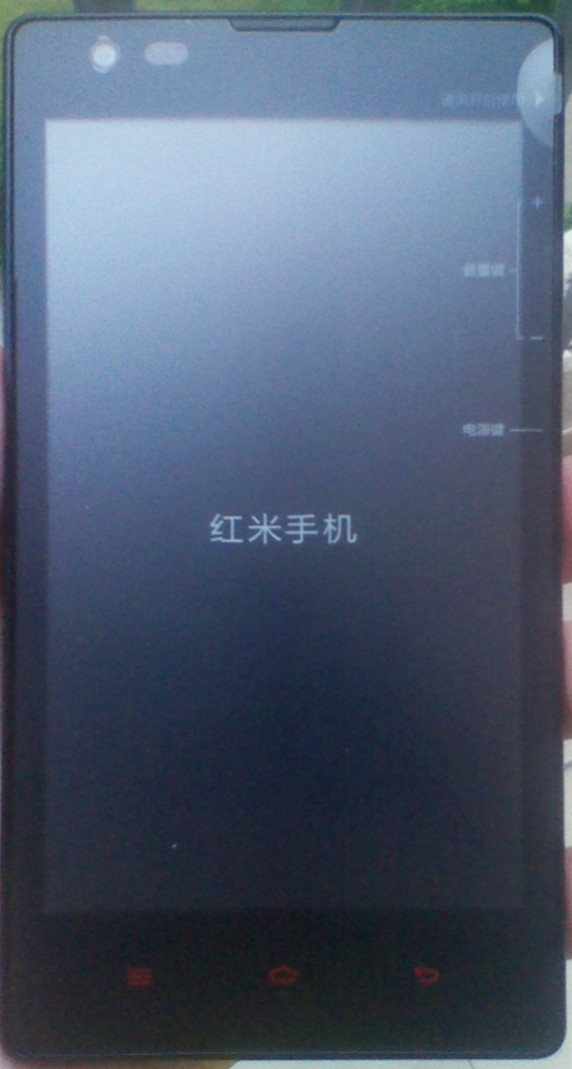
- Developer: Xiaomi Inc.
- Manufacturer: Xiaomi
- Type: Smartphone
- Series: Redmi
- First released: CN: February 2014; 12 years ago IN: July 2014; 11 years ago
- Predecessor: Redmi (phone)
- Successor: Redmi 2
- Compatible networks: GSM: 900/1800/1900; HSPA: 14.4 Mbps 900/2100
- Form factor: Smartphone
- Dimensions: 137 mm (5.4 in) H 69 mm (2.7 in) W 9.9 mm (0.39 in) D
- Weight: 158 g (5.6 oz)
- Operating system: China: MIUI 9 beta and stable based on Android v4.4.4 KitKat Global: MIUI 9 beta and stable based on Android v4.4.4 KitKat
- System-on-chip: 1.6 GHz Qualcomm Snapdragon 400 MSM8228
- CPU: Quad Core ARMv7 1.6 GHz
- GPU: Adreno 305 GPU
- Memory: 1 GB (861 MB usable)
- Storage: 8 GB (5.7 GB usable)
- Removable storage: Supports up to 64 GB microSDXC
- SIM: Dual SIM miniSIM
- Battery: 2,050 mAh, 7.6 Wh, 3.896 V, internal rechargeable Li-Poly, user-replaceable, Battery Scale:100
- Charging: MicroUSB port 2.0 wired charging up to 5W (standard)
- Rear camera: 8 Megapixel auto-focus with LED flash
- Front camera: 1.6 Megapixel (720p HD)
- Display: 4.70 in (119 mm) IPS LCD with AGC Dragontrail Glass; 1280×720 px (312 ppi)
- Connectivity: GPS / GLONASS, Wi-Fi 802.11 b/g/n, Bluetooth 4.0, Micro-USB
- Data inputs: Multi-touch capacitive touchscreen; Accelerometer; A-GPS; Digital compass; Proximity sensor; Push buttons; capacitive touch-sensitive buttons

The Xiaomi Redmi 1S, code-named armani HM 1S, is a smartphone released in May 2014, developed by the Chinese company Xiaomi Inc. It is a part of the Redmi series of smartphones, and succeeded the Redmi 1. Visually similar to its predecessor, it comes with a 4.7-inch screen, a quad-core 1.6 GHz Cortex-A7 processor and runs Android version 4.3 (Jellybean), bundled with the proprietary MIUI v5 user interface, which can be upgraded to MIUI v9 based on Android 4.4.4 KTU84P.

Noted for its low price (₹5,999 (US$63) in India), the Redmi 1S was an extremely popular and a demanded smartphone. Xiaomi opted to sell the smartphone online in order to comply with their minimal capital input. Flipkart was the exclusive retailer of Redmi 1S in India. The company discontinued the smartphone's sale in India in favor of the successors Redmi 2 and Redmi Note.

== Features ==
=== Software ===
The Redmi 1S offers Android 4.3 Jellybean, with proprietary MIUI v5 custom graphical user interface pre-installed by the manufacturer, and can be upgraded to Android 4.4.4 (Kitkat) with MIUI v9 via OTA. The Redmi 1S comes with a factory-unlocked bootloader, allowing users from the outset to further develop the OS and "root" the device, or gain legitimate privileged control in Android's subsystem. Software-development community XDA-Developers was among the first to release a custom rom and kernel for the phone, and since then the phone can unofficially be upgraded to newer versions of the Android OS family and other aftermarket versions. The Redmi 1S has received many unofficial operating systems such as: LineageOS 18.1, CyanogenMod and Mokee OS. Its kernel is open sourced and is available to developers for modification.

=== Hardware ===
The Redmi 1S has a plastic chassis that is 5.39 in (137 mm) long, 2.72 in (69 mm) wide, and 0.39 in (9.9 mm) thick, and weighs 158 g (5.6 oz). The screen is a 4.7-inch IPS LCD capacitive touchscreen, supporting 16-million colors at a resolution of 1280 x 720 pixels, equating to around 312 pixel-per-inch density. The device features a Qualcomm Snapdragon MSM8228 which comprises 1.6 GHz Cortex-A7 quad-core central processing unit (CPU) and an Adreno 305 graphics processing unit (GPU), in conjunction with an accelerometer, gyroscope, compass and a proximity sensor. The device is also equipped with 1 GB RAM and 8 GB internal storage, supporting microSD expansion up to 64 GB. Other features include a microphone, GPS, an 8-megapixel rear camera with auto-focus and LED flash, and a 1.6-megapixel front camera. The rear camera is capable of recording videos at 1080p resolution, while the front camera supports 720p resolution recording. The rear of the smartphone features a plain plastic surface with a brushed metal Xiaomi logo at the center-bottom of the rear cover. The smartphone is shipped with a 2,000 mA AC power charger, for charging its 2000–2,050 mAh(min/typ) battery.

=== Parts Providers ===
- Processor: Qualcomm
- Modem: Qualcomm
- PMIC: Qualcomm
- Wifi/Bluetooth: Qualcomm
- Connectivity: Qualcomm
- Audio: Qualcomm
- RAM: Samsung, Elpida
- Storage: Samsung, Toshiba
- Display panel: Sharp, AUO
- Touch: Focaltech
- Camera: Samsung, OmniVision
- Battery: Coslight, Sunwoda

=== Successor ===
Redmi 2 smartphone, developed and produced by Xiaomi, was released after Xiaomi discontinued its predecessor Redmi 1S. It was announced in January 2015.

== See also ==
- List of Android smartphones
- CyanogenMod
- MIUI
