= Software bundle =

Software bundle may refer to:

- Pre-installed software
- Bundled software
- Software suite
- Solution stack
