= CrDroid =

Custom Android firmware based on LineageOS

crDroid
- Developer: crDroid Team
- OS family: Android (Linux)
- Working state: Active
- Source model: Open source
- Initial release: October 19, 2012; 13 years ago
- Latest release: crDroid 12.12 (Android 16 QPR2) / September 11, 2026; 6 days ago
- Update method: OTA or ZIP installation
- Supported platforms: ARM, ARM64
- Kernel type: Monolithic
- License: Various
- Official website: crdroid.net

crDroid is a customized fork of Android, based on LineageOS. It has offered unofficial releases of Android KitKat up to Android 16.

As of April 2026, the crDroid website lists 158 supported devices, along with the date of the latest release for each.

== History and reception ==
Cristiano Matos developed the initial releases of crDroid in late 2012 for the Samsung Galaxy S III.

In 2014, Saad Khan of Team Android highlighted crDroid's features in a detailed article.

crDroid has gained recognition for its stable releases and user-friendly experience. Notable mentions include articles by Neeraj Jast in 2015, Rafia Shaikh in 2016, and Mathew Diekhake in 2017.

crDroid's popularity increased in 2019 with the availability of Android 10 for various devices, as highlighted by Arol Wright of XDA Developers.

In 2022, crDroid released version 8 (Android 12).

In 2023, crDroid started to roll out builds of some devices with integrated Kernel Assisted Superuser.

crDroid 12 is based on Android 16. Alongside this release, they're also rolling out updates for crDroid 11, which includes the latest security patches.

=== Mentions throughout the years ===
Year	Release highlights
2012	Cristiano Matos develops the first releases for the Samsung Galaxy S III.
2013	Releases gain attention.
2014	Saad Khan of Team Android writes a detailed article on crDroid.
2015	Neeraj Jast highlights features and installation procedure.
2016	Rafia Shaikh writes about upgrading to Android 7.1.1 Nougat ROM on Samsung Galaxy S4 I9505.
2017	Mathew Diekhake of ConsumingTech highlights crDroid version 2.5 Android 7.1.1 Nougat as one of the "Best Custom ROMs" for Nextbit Robin.
2018	Launch of the crDroid website.
2019	Availability of Android 10 with crDroid for several devices highlighted by Arol Wright of XDA developers.
2020	Launch of crDroid 7, initially supporting OnePlus 5/T.
2022	Release of crDroid 8 (Android 12).
2022	Release of crDroid 9 on October 28.
2023	Release of crDroid 10 on December 22.
2024	Release of crDroid 11 on December 16.
2025	Release of crDroid 12 on August 31.

== See also ==
- List of custom Android firmware
