= SuperSU =

Proprietary Android application, 2012–2018

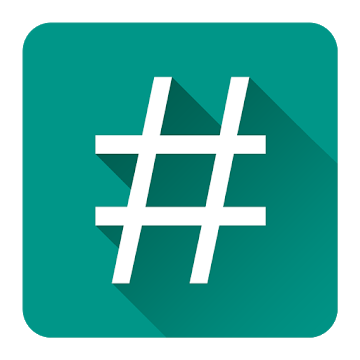
- Original author(s): Chainfire
- Developer(s): Chainfire and CCMT
- Final release: 2.82.1 / 2 January 2018; 7 years ago
- Operating system: Android
- Website: www.supersu.com at the Wayback Machine (archived November 3, 2019)

SuperSU is a discontinued proprietary Android application that can keep track of the root permissions of apps, after the Android device has been rooted. SuperSU is generally installed through a custom recovery such as TWRP. SuperSU includes the option to undo the rooting. SuperSU cannot always reliably hide the rooting. The project includes a wrapper library written in Java called libsuperuser for different ways of calling the su binary.

== History ==
Since 2012, SuperSU app is all maintained by the original author Chainfire himself.

In 2014, support for Android 5.0 was added.

In September 2015, SuperSU was acquired by a Chinese company called Coding Code Mobile Technology LLC (CCMT), raising concerns about privacy and reliability, but Chainfire promised he was closely auditing the changes that CCMT made. Most Android users do not recommend using it now.

In 2018, the application was removed from the Google Play Store and the original developer Chainfire announced their departure of SuperSU development, although others continue to maintain it. As of 2025, many users already switched to Magisk or KernelSU.
