= Bhar (surname) =

Bhar is a surname. Notable people with this surname include:

- Dev Raj Bhar (born 1952), Nepali politician
- Gopal Bhar (fl. 1700s), Bengali court jester
- Mohammad Bhar (c. 2000–2024), Palestinian mentally disabled man
- Mohamed Ali Bhar (born 1989), Tunisian handball player
- Mounira Bhar, Tunisian filmmaker
