= Emteria.OS =

emteria.OS
- Developer: emteria GmbH
- OS family: Linux/Android
- Working state: Current
- Source model: Proprietary, unless obligated otherwise
- Latest release: 17 beta
- Marketing target: Embedded
- License: Commercial
- Official website: emteria.com

Emteria.OS is an Android-based operating system (OS). The application of the OS is mainly purposed for industrial applications such as internet of things, digital signage, vending machines, point of sale or smart city.

== Introduction ==
The emteria.OS is a commercial operating system developed by German company emteria GmbH. It extends the Android Open Source Project (AOSP) platform with additional applications and services with the focus on industrial use cases.

Based on AOSP, emteria.OS is fully compatible with existing applications and components for Android. Also, as an advantage of Android, emteria.OS brings improvements in uniform UI and a framework for app development into different industrial devices.

The platform can be used for reliable industrial applications and products such as point-of-sales systems, smart homes, infotainment installations, as well as for Human Machine Interfaces (HMI), and ticketing machines.

== Market goals ==
Emteria.OS started with Android 7 for Raspberry Pi 3B/3B+, which is a popular maker board and used in industry for proof of concept (PoC) and prototyping. Later a version for Raspberry Pi 4 Model B, Raspberry Pi 400 Personal Computer Kit, and Compute Module 4 was released to support custom RPi-based devices. The latest version of emteria.OS for Raspberry Pi 4B and Raspberry Pi 5 is based on the Android 14 version Upside Down Cake recently released by Google. There is an android 15 release for Raspberry pi. The list of supported platforms has been expanded to devices based on Qualcomm, NXP, Rockchip and Intel chipsets. Emteria is an official Intel Celadon partner, and emteria.OS is listed in the official Raspberry Pi Imager in the Freemium/Paid OSs section. Emteria provides a reliable operating system for production.

== Features ==
The product aims at increasing the adaptability of Android and simplifies its customization. It extends Android in order to meet the needs of enterprises and brings simplicity to the configuration and remote management of devices.

Emteria.OS adds new features to standard Android, in order to make the operation and management for product manufacturers easier:

- App management: it provides an infrastructure for adding private application stores, which companies can use to bring their own apps onto custom hardware, (similar to Google's Play Store and Apple's App Store)
- Simplified customization and provisioning: system settings can be changed via provided web portal, while certain changes like resolution adaptation or driver inclusion in standard Android would require a recompilation of the whole OS. In addition, it allows users to preinstall their settings and applications on many devices instead of installing plain Android and configuring everything manually on each single device. Besides, as the Android image usually consists of several partitions (like BSP, data, system), a provided emteria installer simplifies the installation processes. While consumer devices include a bootloader with Fastboot support, flashing industrial hardware typically means mounting its internal (eMMC) or external (SD cards) memory directly and creating required partitions
- Device and configuration management: clients can monitor their devices remotely and add, start, stop, or delete an application or change system settings on the fly
- Security updates: unlike standard Android, security updates are installed automatically in emteria.OS which helps the producer to keep the device more secure
- OS updates: emteria provides the infrastructure to update emteria.OS and custom ROMs to newer versions via Over-the-Air updates
- Autostart apps: it allows the user to activate or disable the apps to automate starting after booting the device
- Kiosk mode: it allows the system to run only certain apps for the users which increases the security by avoiding unnecessary user access to crucial system files and settings
- More extra features are built-in connectivity with a VNC and SSH server

In addition to a pre-built Android operating system, Emteria offers the service of creating customized Android ROMs based on Board Support Packages (BSP) for different custom boards built on industrial hardware platforms. These custom ROMs are kept up to date with regular security and version updates. Emteria ensures to provide a foundation for a wide variety of hardware—no matter the form-factor.

== Supported hardware ==
A list of supported devices is given in the following table:

Manufacturer	Model
Technology co.	Artista-IoT TFT Controller
Acme Systems srl	ACME CM3-Panel
TechNexion	EDM-G-IMX8M-PLUS
Elo Touch Solutions	Elo I-Series 2.0
Intel	Intel NUC
Raspberry Pi Foundation	Raspberry Pi 3B/3B+, 4B and 5
Raspberry Pi Foundation	Raspberry Pi CM DevKit
Raspberry Pi Foundation	Raspberry Pi Compute Module 3 and 4
Raspberry Pi Foundation	Raspberry Pi 400 Personal Computer Kit
Radxa	ROCK Pi 4 and 5
PHYTEC	phyCORE-i.MX 8M
TechNexion	PICO-IMX8M-MINI
Fortec Integrated	POS-IQ-156-00-PRO
Zima	ZimaBoard Single Board Server

== See also ==
- List of custom Android firmware
