= Redmi (phone) =

Smartphone model

Xiaomi Redmi
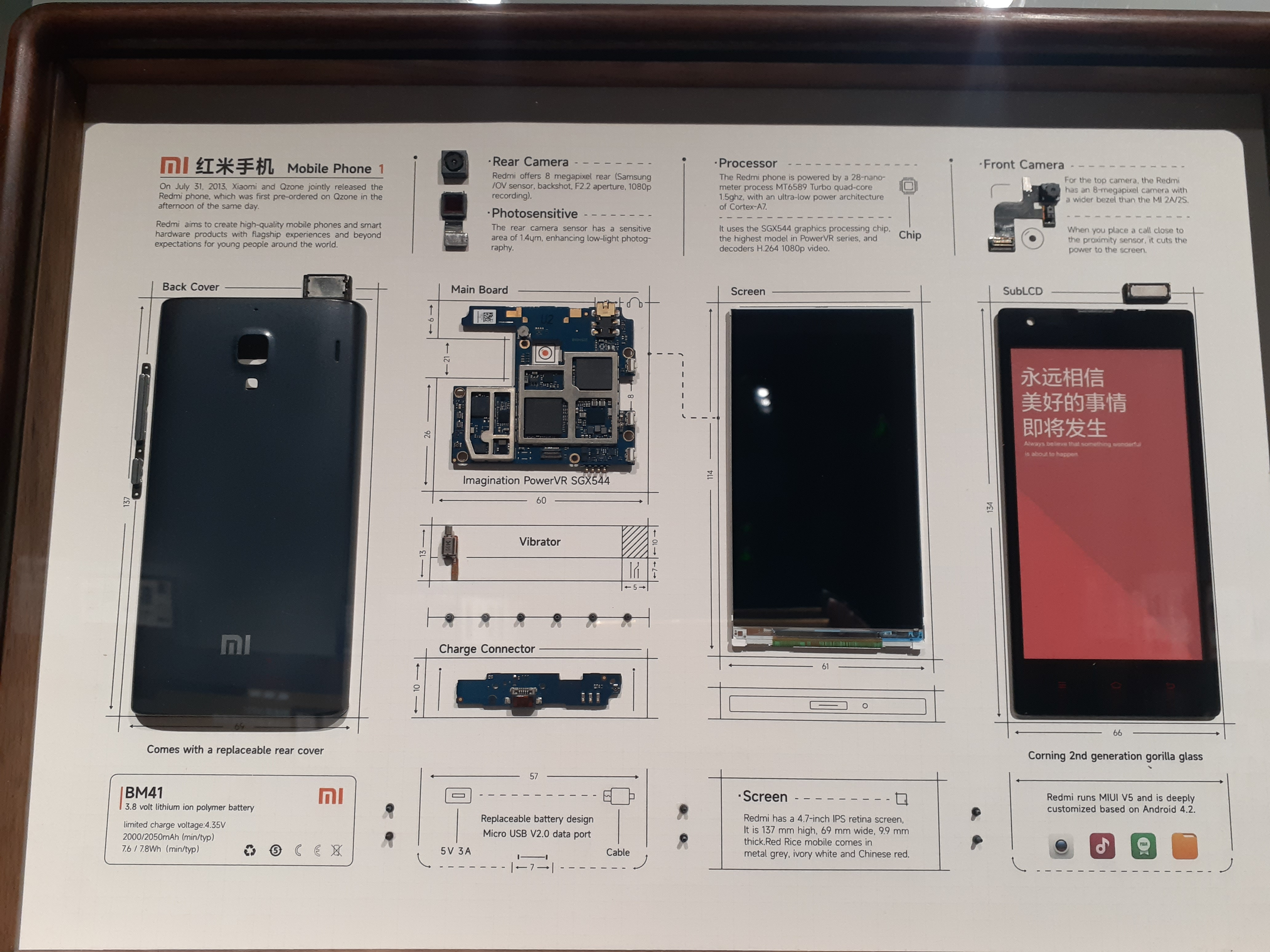
- Also known as: Hongmi, Red Rice
- Manufacturer: Xiaomi
- Type: Smartphone
- Series: Redmi
- First released: China: 31 July 2013; 12 years ago Global: 15 September 2013; 12 years ago
- Successor: Redmi 1S
- Compatible networks: HM2013022: GSM 900/1800/1900MHz; TD-SCDMA 1900/2100MHz; HM2013023: GSM 900/1800/1900MHz; WCDMA 900/2100MHz
- Form factor: Slate
- Dimensions: 137 mm (5.4 in) H 69 mm (2.7 in) W 9.9 mm (0.39 in) D
- Weight: 158 g (5.6 oz)
- Operating system: Original: Android 4.2.2 Jelly Bean with MIUI V5; Current: Android 4.4.2 KitKat with MIUI 9
- System-on-chip: MediaTek MT6589T
- CPU: 1.5Ghz Quad-Core ARM Cortex-A7
- GPU: 357Mhz Single-core PowerVR SGX 544MP
- Memory: 1GB LPDDR2
- Storage: 4GB eMMC 2.0
- Removable storage: Supports up to 32 GB microSD
- Battery: 2,050 mAh, 7.6 Wh, 3.896 V, internal rechargeable Li-Poly, user-replaceable, Battery Scale:100
- Rear camera: 8 Megapixel auto-focus, 3264x2448px, 1.4μm Pixel Size, F/2.2 Optic, Samsung S5K3H2 or OmniVision OV8825 sensor, with LED flash
- Front camera: 1.3 Megapixel fixed-focus, 1280x960px, Aptina MT9M114 sensor
- Display: 4.70 in (119 mm) IPS LCD with Corning Gorilla Glass; 720x1280px (312 ppi), Made by Sharp/AUO
- Media: Audio: MP3, AAC, AAC+, eAAC+ Video: MP4, H.264, H.263
- Connectivity: GPS / GLONASS, Wi-Fi 802.11 b/g/n 2.4Ghz only, Mediatek MT6628QP combo chip, Bluetooth 4.0 BLE, Micro-USB
- Data inputs: Multi-touch capacitive touchscreen; Accelerometer; A-GPS; Digital compass; Proximity sensor; Push buttons; capacitive touch-sensitive buttons
- Codename: WCDMA: HM2013023; TD-SCDMA: HM2013022
- Made in: China

The Xiaomi Redmi (also called Hongmi or Red Rice) is a smartphone released in July 2013 in China and August 2013 in the international market, developed by the Chinese smartphone company Xiaomi Inc. It is the first product of the Redmi series of smartphones. It came with a 4.7-inch 720x1080 IPS screen, a MediaTek MT6589T Quad-core 1.5 GHz Cortex-A7 processor and originally run Android 4.2.2 Jellybean with the MIUI v5 user interface, upgradeable to Android 4.4.2 Kitkat with the MIUI 9 user interface.

Noted for its low price, the Redmi was an extremely popular and a demanded smartphone. Xiaomi opted to sell the smartphone online in order to comply with their minimal capital input.

== Features ==
=== Software ===
The Redmi offers Android 4.2.2 Jellybean with the MIUI v5 user interface, upgradeable to Android 4.4.2 Kitkat with the MIUI 9 user interface.

=== Hardware ===
The Redmi has a plastic chassis that is 5.39 in (137 mm) long, 2.72 in (69 mm) wide, and 0.39 in (9.9 mm) thick, and weighs 158 g (5.6 oz). The screen is a 4.7-inch IPS LCD capacitive touchscreen, supporting 16-million colors at a resolution of 1280 x 720 pixels, equating to around 312 pixel-per-inch density. The device features a Mediatek MT6589T which comprises 1.5 GHz Cortex-A7 quad-core central processing unit (CPU) and an Imagination Technologies PowerVR SGX544MP graphics processing unit (GPU), in conjunction with an accelerometer, gyroscope, compass and a proximity sensor. The device is also equipped with 1 GB RAM and 4 GB internal storage, supporting microSD expansion up to 64 GB. Other features include a microphone, GPS, an 8-megapixel rear camera with auto-focus and LED flash, and a 1.3-megapixel front camera. The rear camera is capable of recording videos at 1080p resolution, while the front camera supports 720p resolution recording. The rear of the smartphone features a plain plastic surface with a brushed metal Xiaomi logo at the center-bottom of the rear cover. The smartphone is shipped with a 1,000 mA AC power charger, for charging its 2000/2,050 mAh(min/typ) battery.

=== Parts Providers ===
- Processor: Mediatek
- Modem: Mediatek
- PMIC: Mediatek
- Wifi/Bluetooth: Mediatek
- Connectivity: Mediatek
- Audio: Mediatek
- RAM: Samsung, Micron
- Storage: Samsung, Micron
- Display panel: Sharp, AUO
- Touch: Focaltech
- Camera: Samsung, OmniVision, Atmel
- Battery: Coslight

=== Successor ===
The Redmi 1S was an upgraded successor to the Redmi, which was announced in May 2014.

== See also ==
- List of Android smartphones
- CyanogenMod
- MIUI
