= LineageOS =

Free and open-source Android-based operating system

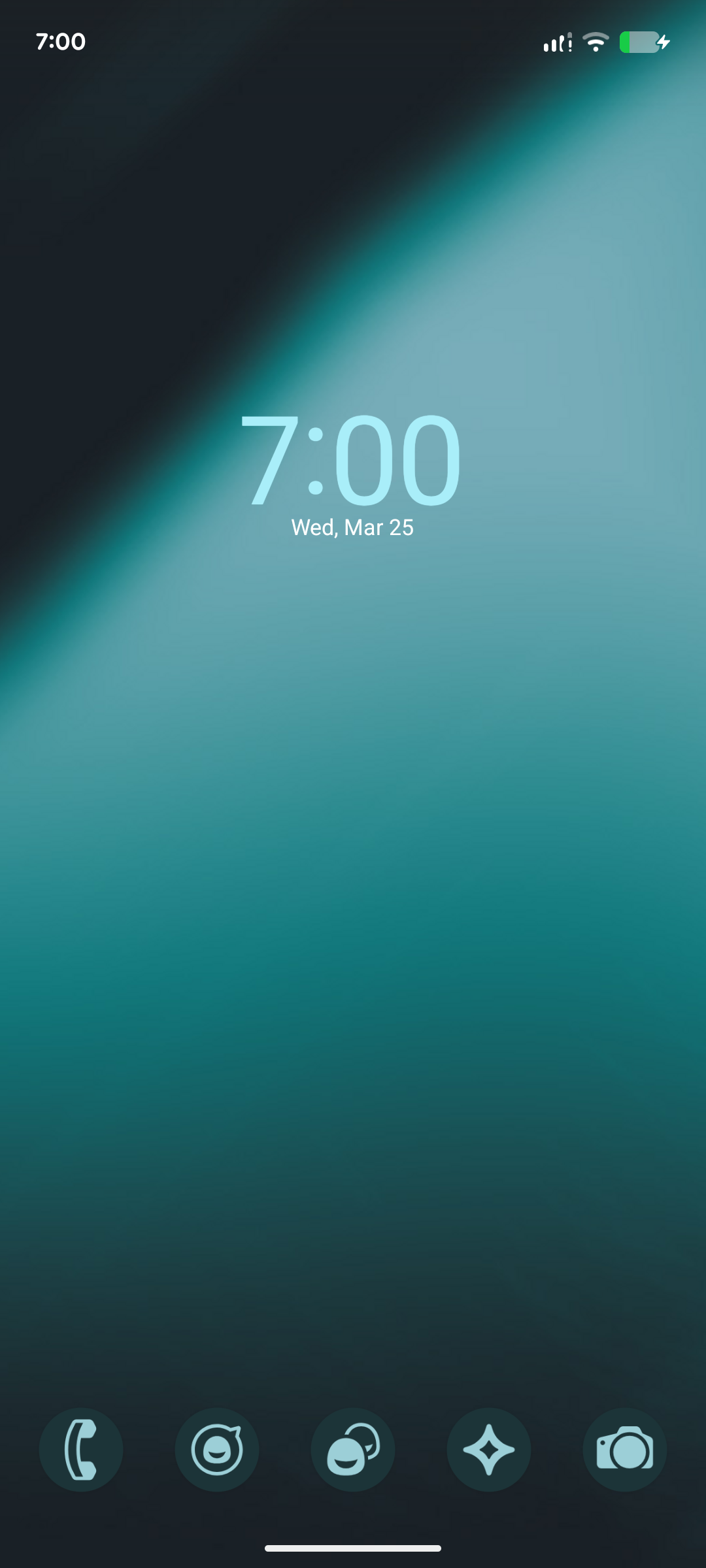
- LineageOS 23.2 home screen on a Motorola Moto G32
- Developer: LineageOS open-source community
- Written in: C (core), C++ (some third party libraries), Java and Kotlin (UI)
- OS family: Android (Linux)
- Working state: Active
- Source model: Open source (includes proprietary libraries)
- Initial release: January 2017; 9 years ago (First public builds)
- Latest release: LineageOS 24.0 (Note: based on Android 17) / 11 October 2026; 33 days ago
- Repository: Gerrit, GitHub, GitLab
- Marketing target: Operating system replacement for Android devices
- Available in: Languages list: Arabic; Bangla; Belarusian; Burmese; Catalan; Simplified Chinese; Traditional Chinese; Czech; Danish; Dutch; English; Filipino; Finnish; French; German; Hebrew; Hindi; Hungarian; Indonesian; Italian; Japanese; Kannada; Korean; Lithuanian; Malay; Malayalam; Norwegian; Polish; Portuguese; Punjabi; Russian; Sinhala; Spanish; Swedish; Tamil; Thai; Turkish; Ukrainian; Vietnamese
- Update method: Over-the-air (OTA), ROM flashing
- Package manager: APK-based, Google Play (if installed)
- Supported platforms: arm, arm64, x86, x86-64
- Kernel type: Monolithic (Linux)
- License: Apache 2 and other licenses
- Preceded by: CyanogenMod CyanogenOS
- Official website: lineageos.org

LineageOS is an open source Android (AOSP)-based operating system (Note: LineageOS is also described as a "custom ROM" distribution.) for smartphones, tablets, and set-top boxes. It is community-developed and serves as the successor to CyanogenMod, from which it was forked in December 2016. As of 2025, there are about 4.5 million devices running LineageOS.

== History ==
In 2009, CyanogenMod (Note: often abbreviated "CM") was created by Stefanie Jane (Cyanogen). (Note: Jane had a different name at the time) In 2013, Jane obtained venture funding under the name Cyanogen Inc. to allow commercialization of the project. In 2016, as part of a corporate restructure which involved a change of CEO, closure of offices and projects, and cessation of services, Jane either left or was forced out of Cyanogen Inc.

The LineageOS project was formed as a fork of Cyanogen and was officially launched on 24 December 2016. Since Cyanogen Inc. retained the rights to the Cyanogen name, the project rebranded its fork as LineageOS.

=== LineageOS' beginning ===
The code itself, being open source, was forked around December 2016 under the new name LineageOS and efforts began to resume development as a community project.

On 22 January 2017, the first official builds of LineageOS versions 14.1 and 13.0 became available, following the official announcement in a blog post. In March 2017, it reportedly had one million users with the OnePlus One being the most popular device. Recent development updates were posted on their blog, though this became infrequent after 2019.

During August 2017, the LineageOS team held a Summer Survey in which they asked users for feedback to improve the development of the operating system. The results were published in October and, according to the team, they used the gathered data to improve the upcoming LineageOS 15 release.

As a response to one of the main suggestions received during their first public survey, LineageOS launched a section on their blog titled "LineageOS Engineering Blog" where Lineage maintainers and developers can contribute articles discussing advanced technical information pertaining to Android development.

=== 2018 April Fools' prank ===
During the first week of April 2018, LineageOS released new builds with the "LOSGenuine" April Fools' prank that informed unaware users of the software possibly being counterfeit via a persistent notification (which could not be disabled unless the user ran the following command in a root shell):

setprop persist.lineage.nofool true

When the notification was tapped, the software claimed that the device was "uncertified" and needed to mine "LOSCoins", which were a virtual currency and could not actually be spent. Affected builds also had a preinstalled "Wallet" app that showed the current balance of LOSCoins.

Many users mistook the prank for actual malware, and others reportedly found it to be in "poor taste". It was especially criticized for being too "late" for an April Fool's joke, since many users didn't receive the update until days later, making the jest less obvious. On 10 April 2018, LineageOS team director ciwrl issued an official apology for the prank.

No further April Fool's pranks were made after.

=== 2018–present ===
A second Summer Survey was conducted in August 2018.

Builds were released on a weekly basis until 12 November 2018, when the release cycle for devices changed: the latest LineageOS branch is built daily, with devices receiving a "nightly" OTA update, while devices on the older branch were moved to a weekly release cycle.

Starting on 5 June 2020, the latest LineageOS branch moved back to a weekly release cycle, as the server couldn't build all available supported devices in just one day, with some devices receiving updates later on the next day.

On 5 March 2024, LineageOS posted a blog to announce the deprecation of version 18.1 shortly after Google had ended security patches for Android 11. A total of 52 devices were dropped and received a final build on that day.

=== Version history ===
Version	AOSP version	First build release date	Last security patches	Ref.
13.0	6.0.1 (Marshmallow)	20 December 2016 as CM; 22 January 2017 as LOS		
14.1	7.1.2 (Nougat)	9 November 2016 as CM; 22 January 2017 as LOS	December 2022, Ongoing backport for November 2025	
15.1	8.1.0 (Oreo)	26 February 2018	November 2025, backported	
16.0	9.0.0 (Pie)	1 March 2019	November 2025, backported	
17.1	10 (Quince Tart)	1 April 2020	November 2025, backported	
18.1	11 (Red Velvet Cake)	1 April 2021	October 2026, backported	
19.1	12.1 (Snow Cone)	26 April 2022	October 2026, backported	
20	13 (Tiramisu)	31 December 2022	October 2026, backported	
21	14 (Upside Down Cake)	14 February 2024	October 2026	
22.2	15 (Vanilla Ice Cream)	31 December 2024	October 2026	
23	16 (Baklava)	11 October 2025	October 2026, requires kernel 4.14	
23.2	16 (Baklava)	8 February 2026	October 2026	
24	17 (Cinnamon Bun)	11 October 2026	October 2026	
Legend: Unsupported Supported Latest version Future version

== Features ==
Like its predecessor, CyanogenMod, LineageOS is perceived as free from unnecessary software often pre-installed by a phone's manufacturer or carrier that is considered to be bloatware.

=== Development ===
Like CyanogenMod, the LineageOS project is developed by many device-specific maintainers and uses Gerrit for its code review process. It also retained the old versioning format, where the major version number corresponds to the place in the alphabet of the first letter of the codename (and of the commercial name for Android versions prior to 10) (for example, Android 7.1, known as Android Nougat, is LineageOS 14.1). Prior to the official launch of LineageOS, many developers from XDA had already developed unofficial versions of LineageOS from the source code. All the released builds are signed with LineageOS' private keys.

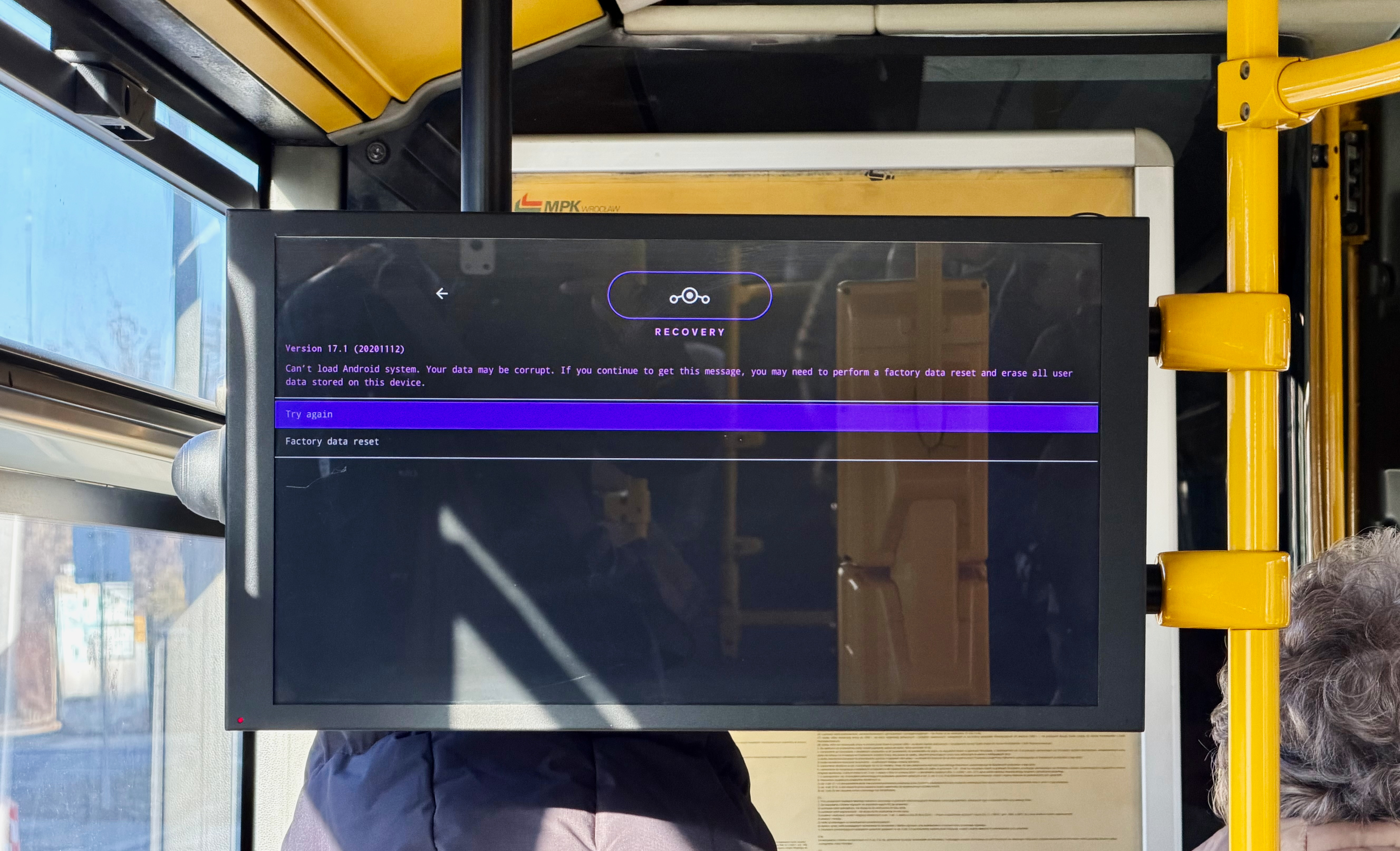
Infotainment devices in Wrocław's buses runs on LineageOS

The wiki, containing information regarding installation, support, and development of LineageOS, is also open to contributions through Gerrit. Other Lineage platforms include Crowdin for managing translations, GitLab Issues for bug tracking, and a stats page, which displays the number of active installations from users who opt in to report this statistic. There is also an IRC channel hosted on Libera.chat (#lineageos) and subreddit (r/lineageos).

The XDA Developers forums have been used by members of the Lineage community since the software's inception. Many devices are left unsupported by official releases so community members develop their own unofficial ROMs allowing older phones to use Lineage.

=== Google apps ===
Although Google apps are not included in LineageOS by default due to legal issues, users can flash them with a .zip package, usually referred to as gapps, while installing LineageOS. A side effect of using LineageOS and other custom roms is the impact on Play Integrity API. LineageOS can in some cases be made to work with apps that require passing Play Integrity by installing Magisk and certain modules designed to hide the bootloader status.

=== Customization features ===
LineageOS offers several features that Android Open Source Project (AOSP) does not include. Some of these features are:

- Button customization – Set custom location for buttons on the navigation bar, or enable on-screen buttons for devices with hardware buttons.
- Custom Quick-Setting tiles – Quick Setting Tiles such as "Caffeine" preventing the device from sleeping, enabling/disabling Heads Up notifications, "Ambient Display" and "ADB over network" are present to easily toggle frequently accessed settings.
- LiveDisplay – Adjust color temperature for the time of day.
- Lock screen customization – The lock screen allows all sorts of customizations, including media cover art, a music visualizer, and double-tap to sleep.
- Styles – Set a global dark or light theme mode and customize accent colors. This functionality can also be managed automatically by the system based on wallpaper or time of day (in line with LiveDisplay).
- System Profiles – Enable or disable common settings based on the selected profile (For example, a "Home" profile and a "Work" profile). The profile can be selected either manually or through the use of a "trigger", such as upon connecting to a specific WiFi access point, connecting to a Bluetooth device, or tapping an NFC tag.
- Custom pattern sizes – In addition to Android's 3x3 pattern size, a 4x4, 5x5 or 6x6 size can be used.

=== Security & privacy features ===
- Trust – a control panel providing an overview of the device's security and privacy status and features. The Trust icon is displayed when performing certain actions in order to confirm their authenticity.
- PIN scramble – For users securing their device with a PIN, the PIN pad layout can be scrambled each time the device locks to make it difficult for bystanders to observe and memorize input patterns.
- Privacy guard – Allow the user to fine-tune what permissions are granted to each application. For some permissions, it is possible to set a manual approval each time the permission is requested. It is also possible to find out how often apps use a specific permission. This feature was removed in the 17.1 branch in favor of an equivalent "permission controller" based on a hidden AOSP feature.
- Protected Apps – Hide specific apps behind a secure lock. This works hand-in-hand with Trebuchet; the app's icon is removed from the launcher, and "secure folders" can be created to easily access these applications. A pattern is used to lock these apps.
- Some "sensitive numbers", such as abuse support numbers, are not included in the call log for privacy. The phone application also includes a list of helpline numbers for the users to be able to easily reach them.

=== Developers & power user features ===
- LineageSDK – a set of APIs for app developers to integrate their apps with LineageOS specific features such as System Profiles, Styles and Weather. The SDK been officially discontinued on 8 January 2024.
- Lineage Recovery – an AOSP-based recovery.
- (Optional) Root – Permit apps to function with root access to perform advanced tasks. This requires flashing from Recovery either LineageOS's root add-on (supported until version 16.0) or a third-party implementation such as Magisk or KernelSU.
- Telephone call recorder, not available in all countries, due to legal restrictions.

=== LineageOS apps ===
LineageOS includes free and open-source apps:

Current

Name	Description	Based on or forked from	Ref.
Aperture	A camera app maintained by various LineageOS developers, based on Google's CameraX library. It replaced Snap and Camera2 with the release of LineageOS 20.	–	–
AudioFX	Audio optimizer with presets to alter the listening experience.	–	–
Calculator	Resembles a four-function calculator and offers some more advanced functions.	–	–
Calendar	Calendar functionality with Day, Week, Month, Year or Agenda views.	Etar, since LineageOS 17.1.	–
Camelot (PDF Viewer)	A simple PDF reader, powered by Jetpack PDF library.	–	LOS 22
Clock	World clock, countdown timer, stopwatch and alarms.	–	–
Contacts	Phonebook for numbers and email addresses.	–	–
Files	A simple file manager to move, copy and rename files on internal storage or SD card.	–	–
FlipFlap	An app for smart flip covers, only included on select devices.	–	–
FM Radio	An app for listening to FM radio broadcasts, included on devices with an FM tuner.	–	–
Glimpse	A gallery app with Material You design in mind. Available on devices running LineageOS 21 or later.	–	LOS 21
Jelly (Browser)	A lightweight browser that relies on the system WebView, for low-end devices.	–	–
Messaging	An SMS/MMS messaging app.	–	–
Phone	Includes speed dial, phone number lookups and call blocking.	–	–
Recorder	A sound recorder. In versions prior to 18.1 it could also record the screen.	–	–
Trebuchet	A customizable launcher.	–	–
Twelve (Music)	A music player with music library server protocols support.	–	LOS 21

Former

Name	Description	Based on or forked from	Ref.
cLock	A clock and a weather widget.	–	–
Eleven (Music)	A simple music player.	–	–
Email	Email client that handles POP3, IMAP and Exchange (removed in LineageOS 18.1).	–	
Gallery	Organize photos and videos into a timeline or albums for easy viewing. Replaced by Glimpse.	–	–
Gello	A browser based on Chromium and developed by CyanogenMod. This app is now replaced by Jelly.	–	–
Snap (Camera)	Dependent on device specification will take video or photos, including panoramic. It can also be used to read QR codes. This app is now replaced by Aperture.	–	–
Terminal	A simple and standard terminal app. Hidden unless enabled in the developer settings. (removed in LineageOS 18.1).	–	
Themes	Originally an app by itself, now integrated into the settings app.	–	–
WeatherUnderground Weather Provider	A weather provider.	–	–
Yahoo Weather Provider	A weather provider.	–	–

== Supported devices ==
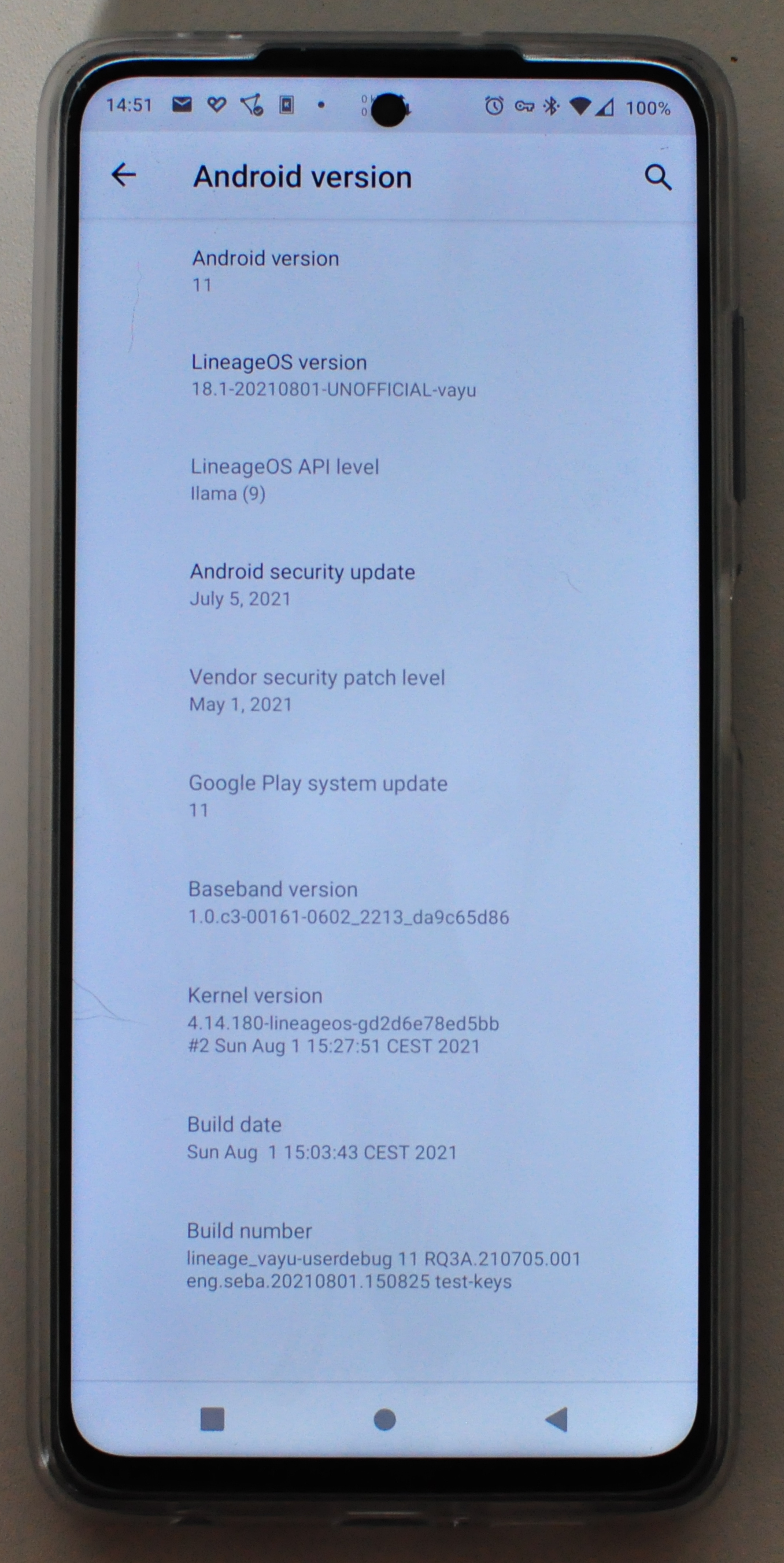
POCO X3 Pro smartphone running LineageOS 18 Unofficial

The number of devices supported by LineageOS has changed over time.

In 2019, LineageOS development builds were available for 109 phone models with over 3.0 million active installs.

On 17 February 2024, it was recorded that 118 devices were receiving official LineageOS 21 builds, another 71 devices with LineageOS 20 builds, and the legacy LineageOS 18.1 branch still had a total of 52 devices. On 31 December 2024, a total of 196 devices were recorded on the LineageOS build roster, with 132 devices receiving LineageOS 22.1 builds, and the remaining 64 devices with LineageOS 21 builds.

== Reception ==
LineageOS was reviewed positively by 9to5Google, a news website centered around Google products.

Android Police named LineageOS as a good way to extend a device's lifetime, for example with the Google Pixel 4a.

In January 2025, Lifewire described the operating system as "very stable," noting its wide device support, long-standing reputation, and regular updating process. Wired reported in March 2025 that LineageOS can help older Android phones remain functional and updated, while giving users the option to avoid Google services. Similarly, 9to5Google noted that the project provided continued updates for devices that had lost official support, such as the Google Pixel 4a after August 2023.

An Android Authority review in 2025 found that LineageOS delivered a clean interface, fast performance, and improved battery life, though some stock features such as advanced camera modes and NFC payments were not always available.

However, the project has also faced criticism regarding privacy and security. In 2023, German security researcher Mike Kuketz argued that LineageOS had not implemented strong privacy protections, citing its reliance on Google components and inconsistent update practices that vary by maintainer. The technology site Golem.de similarly reported that LineageOS lacks some security features, including Verified Boot, and that delayed security patches and open bootloaders may expose users to additional risks.

== Forks ==
LineageOS has a number of notable forks:

=== Direct forks ===
- DivestOS was a soft fork of LineageOS that aimed to increase security and privacy, and support older devices. It was discontinued in December 2024.
- /e/ is a fork of LineageOS created by Gaël Duval that is intended to be "free from Google". It replaces Google Play Services with microG.
- iodéOS is a fork of LineageOS developed by French company iodé. It does not include Google Play Services, instead using microG.
- LineageOS for microG is a LineageOS fork bundled with microG services. The project was born as a response to LineageOS's continued refusal to merge the signature spoofing patches required to run microG. (LineageOS later merged the required patches, making this project a convenience rather than a necessity.) The project also sporadically provides new builds for older devices abandoned by official LineageOS, both with and without microG support.
- Replicant intends to be a completely free software variant of LineageOS, with all kernel blobs and non-free drivers removed.
- crDroid is a fork of LineageOS that is intended for more customization than what stock manufacturers provide.
- Evolution X is a fork of LineageOS that is designed to bring over the Pixel UI experience while also adding more customisation than stock LineageOS.

=== Other derivative ===
- CalyxOS is a privacy-focused operating system for smartphones, based on Android Open Source Project (AOSP), but uses LineageOS components.
- The compatibility layer Waydroid (Note: Formerly called Anbox-Halium) is using LineageOS in an LXC container in order to use Android apps on a desktop or mobile Linux distribution.

== See also ==
- Android rooting
- Comparison of mobile operating systems
- List of custom Android distributions
- postmarketOS
- List of free and open-source Android applications
