= LEWA =

Manufacturer of metering pumps

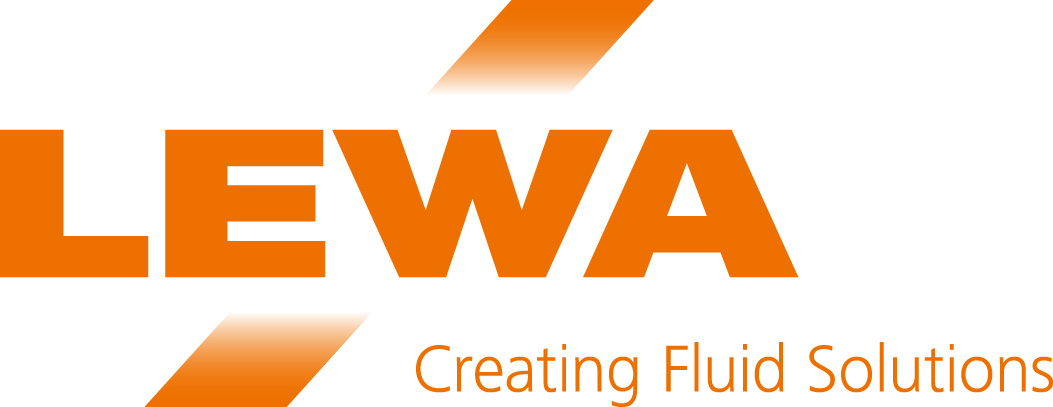
- LEWA logo (2014)
- Formerly: Ingenieurbüro LEWA
- Industry: mechanical engineering of metering pumps and metering systems
- Founded: Leonberg, Germany (1952)
- Founder: Herbert Ott, Rudolf Schestag
- Headquarters: Leonberg, Germany
- Key people: Stefan Glasmeyer, Dr. Martin Fiedler
- Production output: metering pumps, process pumps metering systems,
- Owner: Atlas Copco Group
- Number of employees: ca. 600 in Germany
- Website: www.lewa.com

LEWA is a manufacturer of diaphragm metering pumps, process pumps as well as customized metering systems and production units. The company has developed from a pure technology provider to a solution provider over the last years. LEWA systems are in use in oil & gas and chemical industry.

The headquarters of the company are located in Leonberg (Stuttgart Metropolitan Region) in the south of Germany. LEWA is part of the Atlas Copco Group.

Industrial Flow North America LLC, which has its head office in Houston, Texas is an American Customer Center of Atlas Copco that sells LEWA pumps.

== History ==
The company was founded in 1952 as "Ingenieurbüro LEWA" ("Engineering Office LEWA") by the two engineers Herbert Ott and Rudolf Schestag. LEWA stands for Leonberger Wasseraufbereitung (water conditioning in Leonberg). In 1954, LEWA applied for a patent for the rocker arm pump. In 1955, the company participated in Achema, an exhibition in Frankfurt am Main, for the first time.

In 1961, a research group was established, which promoted research and development of LEWA's pumps. LEWA applied for a patent for the sandwich diaphragm for diaphragm pumps in 1968. Since 1971, the company also has developed complete metering systems and production units.

With the death of Herbert Ott in 1999, LEWA's long tradition as a family-owned business ended. In 2003, the diaphragm pump LEWA ecoflow came into the market, which has been a major support to the company's income since then.

In 2006, the investment company "Deutsche Beteiligungs AG" acquired LEWA. However, since 2009, LEWA is part of the Japanese corporation Nikkiso.

Nikkiso is market leader in Japan in the water conditioning of nuclear and thermal power plants, it supplies various pumps and flaps for the thrust reversal in jet aircraft. Worldwide, Nikkiso is the third largest provider of mobile hemodialysis machines.

In 2011, LEWA developed a system for process chromatography.

On January 1, 2013, long-standing CEO of LEWA, Bernd M. Stütz, has passed off his position to Naota Shikano.

In January 2016, the management was restructured. The new Managing Director was Peter Wagner, who also took over the management of the newly created Industrial Division, consisting of the Lewa Group, Geveke NV, Nikkiso Cryo and Nikkiso's Japanese pump business. Shikano moved to the parent company in Japan.On September 1, 2018, Wagner was replaced by Tsunehisa Suita at the helm of the LEWA Group, while Wagner took over the management of the Cryogenic Industries group of companies previously acquired by the parent company Nikkiso.

Since 2022 LEWA ist part of the Swedish Atlas Copco Group.

== LEWA today ==
Customers of LEWA come from the oil and gas, chemical, petrochemical, plastics, energy utilities, pharma, biotech, personal care, cleaning and detergent industries.

LEWA delivers:

- metering diaphragm pumps with discharge pressures up to 1,200 bar (e.g. LEWA ecoflow, LEWA ecosmart, LEWA ecodos),
- process diaphragm pump with discharge pressures up to 1,200 bar (e.g. LEWA ecoflow, LEWA triplex)
- complex metering, mixing and odorizing systems
