= Kernel Assisted Superuser =

Kernel space root solution for Android

KernelSU is a kernel space root solution for Android devices. KernelSU implementations are developed as free and open-source software under the terms of the GPLv3 license.

== Technical differences ==
KernelSU differs from other methods in that root access is implemented directly in the kernel. Compared to other root methods that run in userspace, such as Magisk, this has the advantage that commands with su can be executed like normal commands, but still have root privileges. This is not prevented by SELinux or detected by the PlayIntegrity API check, so applications that use it will continue to function. Unlike Magisk, /system/bin/su is a virtual file implemented by hooking system calls with kprobes, and metamodules are responsible for systemless modifications to read-only partitions like the system partition instead of magic mount.

== History ==
The planning of KernelSU was started in 2018 by developer Jason Donenfeld, also known as XDA user zx2c4. The lack of a root manager app and the difficulty of creating boot images meant that KernelSU was not suitable for productive use, and for a long time this method remained theoretical and could only be used by developers. In 2021, Google launched Generic Kernel Images (GKI for short), which facilitates the creation of a set of device-independent rooted boot images. In response, the developer known on XDA as weishu, who had also worked on projects such as VirtualXposed, adapted KernelSU for GKI-compatible kernels. The adaptation, which was released in January 2023, ensures that any device booting with Linux kernel version 5.10 or higher should be compatible. In addition, the developer also offers a special manager app that, in addition to managing root privileges, also offers overlay-based modding similar to Magisk modules. As of November 2025, 310 developers have contributed to the development of the KernelSU implementation.

== Installation ==
KernelSU can be installed on all devices that use generic kernel images (GKI) running a kernel version 5.10 or above, as well as on individually supported non-GKI devices. Some custom ROMs already have it integrated by default, including ROMs such as CrDroid, Bliss OS, and Evolution X.

== See also ==
- Magisk
- SuperSU
