= Mounira Bhar =

Tunisian filmmaker

- Citizenship: Tunisia
- Education: Sorbonne University
- Occupation: Filmmaker

Mounira Bhar is a Tunisian filmmaker. She holds a Master of Advanced Studies in aesthetic philosophy obtained at the Sorbonne.

== Filmography ==
=== Feature films ===
- 2002: El Kotbia (La Librairie)

=== Short films ===
- 1989 : L’union sacrée
- 1992 : Itineraire
- 1993 : Kenz
- 1998 : Couplouètes
