= Rooting (Android) =

Modification of Android devices to gain rooted access

Rooting is the process by which users of Android devices can attain privileged control (known as root access) over various subsystems of the device, usually smartphones and tablets. Because Android is based on a modified version of the Linux kernel, rooting an Android device gives access to administrative (superuser) permissions similar to those on Linux or any other Unix-like operating system such as FreeBSD or macOS.

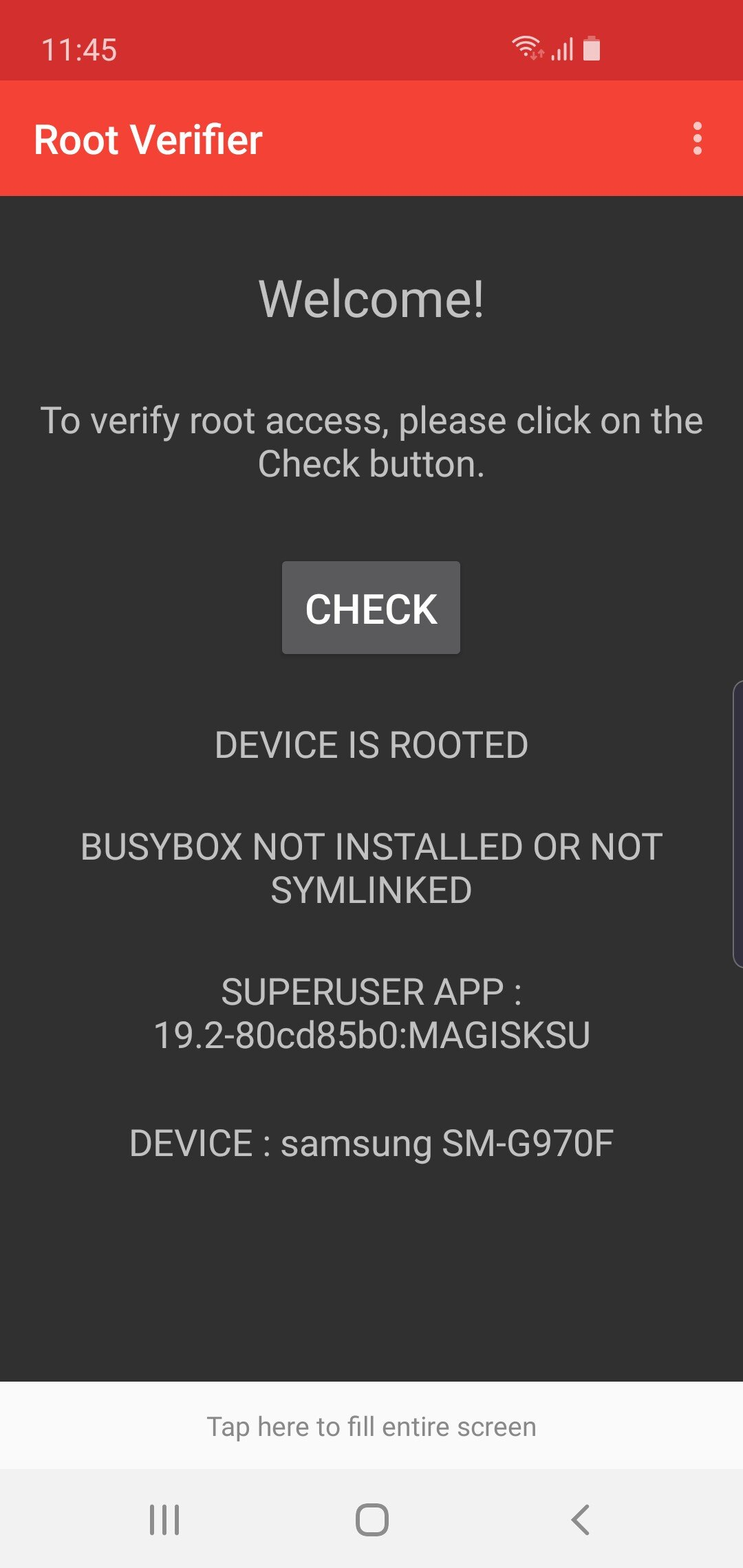
Root Verifier app (open-source software)

A battery drained Android device rooted with the SuperSU root manager

Rooting is often performed to overcome limitations that carriers and hardware manufacturers put on some devices. Thus, rooting allows the users to alter or replace system applications and settings, run specialized applications ("apps") that require administrator-level permissions, or perform other operations that are otherwise inaccessible to a normal Android user. On some devices, rooting can also facilitate the complete removal and replacement of the device's operating system, usually with a more recent release of its current operating system.

Root access is sometimes compared to jailbreaking on devices running the Apple iOS operating system. However, these are different concepts: jailbreaking is the bypass of several types of Apple prohibitions for the end user, including modifying the operating system (enforced by a "locked bootloader"), installing non-officially approved (not available on the App Store) applications via sideloading, and granting the user elevated administration-level privileges (rooting). Some vendors, such as HTC, Sony (except Japan and US region devices), Samsung (until One UI 8), OnePlus, Xiaomi, and Google, have provided the ability to unlock the bootloaders of some devices, thus enabling advanced users to make operating system modifications. Similarly, the ability to sideload applications is typically permissible on Android devices without root permissions. Thus, it is primarily the third aspect of iOS jailbreaking (giving users administrative privileges) that most directly correlates with Android rooting.

Rooting is distinct from SIM unlocking and bootloader unlocking. The former allows for the removal of the SIM card lock on a phone, while the latter allows rewriting the phone's boot partition (for example, to install or replace the operating system).

== Overview ==
Rooting lets all user-installed applications run privileged commands typically unavailable to the devices in the stock configuration. Rooting is required for more advanced and potentially dangerous operations including modifying or deleting system files, removing pre-installed applications, and low-level access to the hardware itself (rebooting, controlling status lights, or recalibrating touch inputs.) A typical rooting installation also installs a Superuser application, which supervises applications that are granted root or superuser rights by requesting approval from the user before granting said permissions. A secondary operation, unlocking the device's bootloader verification, is required to remove or replace the installed operating system.

In contrast to iOS jailbreaking, rooting is not needed to run applications distributed outside of the Google Play Store, known as sideloading. The Android OS supports this feature natively in two ways: through the "Unknown sources" option in the Settings menu and through the Android Debug Bridge. However, some US carriers, including AT&T, have prevented the installation of applications not on the Play Store in firmware, although several devices are not subject to this rule, including the Samsung Infuse 4G; AT&T lifted the restriction on most devices by the middle of 2011.

As of 2011, the Amazon Kindle Fire defaults to using the Amazon Appstore instead of Google Play, though like other Android devices, Kindle Fire allows sideloading of applications not from an approved store, and the "easy installer" application on the Amazon Appstore makes this easy. Other vendors of Android devices may look to other sources in the future.

Some devices, including those by Huawei and any brand sold by Verizon cannot easily be rooted, unless a privilege escalation exploit is found in the device's operating system version.

=== Advantages ===
Screenshot of Magisk on a Samsung Galaxy Tab S3, an application to manage root access in Android

Advantages of rooting include the possibility for complete control over the appearance, feel, and behaviour of the device. As a superuser has access to the device's system files, all aspects of the operating system can be customized with the only real limitation being the level of coding expertise. Immediately expectable advantages of rooted devices include the following:

- The device owner can fully access and manage every file and directory stored on their device, including in directories that are invisible to the normal user, such as the /data directory. This allows backups and restorations of the entire system, and duplication of user data and preferences to a different rooted device.
- Normal storage access can be restored if disabled by Google. One such example is restoring normal write access to the microSD memory card on Android 4.4 KitKat.
- The MicroSD card can be treated as a mass storage device without removing it from the phone.
- Support for theming, allowing everything to be visually changed from the color and type of the battery status indicator to the boot animation that appears while the device is booting, the status bar, control menu, virtual on-screen navigation buttons, and more.
- Full control of the kernel, which, for example, allows overclocking and underclocking the CPU and GPU.
- Full application control, including the ability to fully back up, restore, or batch-edit applications, or to remove bloatware that comes pre-installed on some phones.
- Custom automated system-level processes through the use of third-party applications.
- Ability to install software (such as Xposed, Magisk, SuperSU, BusyBox, etc.) that allows additional levels of control on a rooted device or management of root access.
- Access to more Unix shell commands, both standalone and through Android Debug Bridge.
- Ability to bypass restrictions by vendors or Google, such as scoped storage, which compromised file system access and compatibility to established third-party mobile applications such as file managers.
- Extended task management abilities
  - Ability to terminate misbehaving and/or unresponsive system tasks such as media scanner and camera server manually.
- Ability to downgrade applications directly, without uninstallation which involves deleting their user data. A downgrade may be desirable after an update breached compatibility and/or removed useful functionality.
- Ability to control battery charging current, where a technically unnecessary throttling imposed by the operating system while the screen is on can be removed. On the other hand, a current reduction may be desired to extend battery lifespan. APIs may vary per vendor. For example, on Samsung Galaxy devices, this is done by applying a value to the /sys/devices/platform/sec-battery/power_supply/battery/siop_level system file, where 100 represents the highest technically supported charging rate. (Note: /sys/class/power_supply/battery/siop_level is a shorthand symbolic link to that system file.)
- Ability to limit charging capacity to reduce battery weardown.
- Overriding screenshot blocks. Normally, Android gives application developers the authority to allow or deny device owners from capturing screenshots and screen recordings. A developer can impose screenshot blocks on parts or the entire application.
- Installing customized versions of pre-installed system applications. Normally, system applications have to be digitally signed by their respective developers in order to be installable.
- Phone call recording with no external device. In a minority of jurisdictions, it is the responsibility of the user to first acquire consent by the other participant if required by law where they reside, with or without an external recording device.

=== Disadvantages ===
Disadvantages of rooting include:

- On some brands, including Samsung and Motorola, rooting voids a device's warranty.
- If used incorrectly, rooting can cause stability issues with the software or hardware. If the issues are purely software-based, unrooting the phone can often resolve these issues.
- In the case of a malicious exploit, the attacker has privileged access to device systems.
- Android Play Integrity API is tripped so some apps will not work or will not be shown on the Play Store.

=== Related concepts ===
Rooting allows the user to obtain privileged access to a phone. It does not allow a user to install a new OS (custom firmware or custom ROM) or recovery image, and it doesn't allow a phone that is locked to a certain carrier to be used on another one. Related operations allow these.

==== Bootloader unlock ====
Bootloader unlocking is sometimes a first step used to root the device; however, it is not the same as rooting the device. Most devices come with a locked bootloader, which prevents users from installing a new boot image, which is often flashed when rooting a device or using a custom ROM. The bootloader runs on device start-up and is in charge of loading the operating system on the phone. It is generally in charge of verifying that phone system information hasn't been tampered with and is genuine. Nonetheless, people still perform this operation, as unlocking the bootloader allows users to install custom ROMs.

The first step to do this is generally to set up OEM unlocking, and then to follow manufacturer specific instructions. Not all devices can be bootloader unlocked, and some can only be unlocked with an exploit which usually needs a privilege escalation bug in order to remove software locks, which includes most LG V20 models and Verizon-sold Google Pixel devices.

The process of unlocking the bootloader might involve a factory reset, erasing all user data, third-party applications, and configuration.

==== SIM unlock ====
SIM unlocking allows a phone that is locked to a certain carrier to be used on a different carrier. The instructions vary per device and carrier, but this might be done by first requesting the carrier to unlock the phone or purchasing an unlock code online.

=== Methods ===
Some rooting methods involve the use of a command prompt and a development interface called the Android Debug Bridge (also known as ADB), while other methods may use existing vulnerabilities in devices. Due to similarly modeled devices often having a multitude of changes, rooting methods for one device when used for a different variant can result in bricking the device.

"Systemless root" is a variant of rooting in which the underlying device file system is not modified. Systemless root uses various techniques to gain root access without modifying the system partition of a device. Some root applications may include a "hiding" function, which makes attempts to mask the effects and results of rooting, often by whitelisting certain applications for the root or blocking access to affected files. Systemless rooting has the advantage of not triggering the software-based version of SafetyNet, an Android feature that works by monitoring changes to system files and is used by applications such as Google Pay to detect whether a device has been tampered with such as by rooting. However, hardware-backed SafetyNet versions may be triggered by systemless rooting, as well as in unrooted devices shipped without Google Mobile Services (GMS).

The distinction between "soft rooting" through a security vulnerability and "hard-rooting" by flashing a su binary executable varies from exploit to exploit, and manufacturer to manufacturer. Soft-rooting requires that a device be vulnerable to privilege escalation, or replacing executable binaries. Hard-rooting is supported by the manufacturer, and it is generally only exposed for devices the manufacturer allows. If a phone can be soft-rooted, it is also inherently vulnerable to malware.

== Rooting through exploits ==
The process of rooting varies widely by manufacturer and device but sometimes includes exploiting one or more security bugs in the firmware (i.e., in the version of the Android OS installed on) of the device. Once an exploit is discovered, a custom recovery image that will skip the digital signature check of firmware updates can be flashed. Then a modified firmware update that typically includes the utilities needed to run apps as root can be installed. For example, the su binary (such as an open-source one paired with the Superuser or SuperSU application) can be copied to a location in the current process' PATH (e.g., /system/xbin/) and granted executable permissions with the chmod command. A third-party supervisor application, like Superuser or SuperSU, can then regulate and log elevated permission requests from other applications. Many guides, tutorials, and automatic processes exist for popular Android devices facilitating a fast and easy rooting process.

The process of rooting a device may be simple or complex, and it even may depend upon serendipity. For example, shortly after the release of the HTC Dream (HTC G1), it was discovered that anything typed using the keyboard was being interpreted as a command in a privileged (root) shell. Although Google quickly released a patch to fix this, a signed image of the old firmware leaked, which gave users the ability to downgrade and use the original exploit to gain root access. Installable apps have managed to unlock immediate root access on some early 2010s Samsung smartphones. This has also been referred to as "one-click rooting".

A security researcher, Grant Hernandez, demonstrated a use-after-free exploit in Binder, Android's IPC framework, to gain root privileges. This exploit, tagged CVE-2019-2215, was alleged to be sold by the NSO Group.

=== Difficulties ===
There may be no root exploit available for new, or outdated phones.

== Rooting through manufacturer ==
Some manufacturers, including OnePlus and Motorola, provide official support for unlocking the bootloader, allowing for rooting without exploiting a vulnerability. However, the support may be limited only to certain phones – for example, LG released its bootloader unlock tool only for certain models of its phones. Also, a manufacturer could discontinue bootloader unlocking support, as was the case with LG and Huawei.

The Google Nexus and Pixel line of devices can have their bootloader unlocked by simply connecting the device to a computer while in bootloader mode and running the Fastboot protocol with the command fastboot oem unlock on older devices, or fastboot flashing unlock on newer devices. After a warning is accepted, the bootloader is unlocked, so a new system image can be written directly to flash without the need for an exploit. Additionally, Pixel phones sold via certain carriers like Verizon disallow bootloader unlocking, while others such as T-Mobile require a phone to be paid off and SIM unlocked before the bootloader can be unlocked.

== Industry reaction ==
Until 2010, tablet and smartphone manufacturers, as well as mobile carriers, were mainly unsupportive of third-party firmware development. Manufacturers had expressed concern about improper functioning of devices running unofficial software and related support costs. Moreover, firmware such as OmniROM and CyanogenMod previously offered features which carriers would otherwise charge a premium for, such as tethering. Due to that, technical obstacles such as non unlockable bootloaders and restricted access to root permissions were commonly introduced in many devices. For example, in late December 2011, Barnes & Noble and Amazon.com, Inc. began pushing automatic, over-the-air firmware updates, 1.4.1 to Nook Tablets and 6.2.1 to Kindle Fires, that removed one method to gain root access to the devices. The Nook Tablet 1.4.1 update also removed users' ability to sideload apps from sources other than the official Barnes & Noble app store (without modding).

However, as community-developed software began to grow popular in the late 2009 to early 2010, and following a statement by the Copyright Office and Librarian of Congress (US) allowing the use of "jailbroken" mobile devices, manufacturers and carriers have softened their position regarding CyanogenMod and other unofficial firmware distributions. Some manufacturers, including HTC, Motorola, and Sony, actively provide support and encourage development.

In 2011, the need to circumvent hardware restrictions to install unofficial firmware lessened as an increasing number of devices shipped with unlocked or unlockable bootloaders, similar to the Nexus and Pixel series of phones. In the same year, HTC announced that it supported aftermarket software developers by making the bootloaders of all new devices unlockable; this lasted up until June 2018 when their mobile division was sold to Google with the brand becoming a white label.

While Samsung previously offered support for bootloader unlocking, starting in 2025 with the One UI 8 update, they have completely restricted it worldwide, preventing users from rooting any Samsung devices updated to One UI 8. Paradoxically, this restriction was previously not applied to the Samsung Galaxy XR mixed reality headset, which remained unlockable up until the December 2025 security update. In 2014, Samsung released a security feature called Knox, which verifies whether system and boot files were modified. If custom firmware was flashed, the eFuse is set to 0x1, permanently voiding the warranty and disabling Knox-enabled features such as Samsung Pay. Additionally, certain Samsung devices lack the ability to flash custom software, namely Samsung phones and tablets released in North America after 2015, with an exception for devices lacking a cellular modem, although there are exploits that can unlock the bootloader on some affected devices running older One UI versions.

== Legality ==
International treaties have influenced the development of laws affecting rooting. The 1996 World Intellectual Property Organization (WIPO) Copyright Treaty requires nations party to the treaties to enact laws against digital rights management (DRM) circumvention. The American implementation is the Digital Millennium Copyright Act (DMCA), which includes a process for establishing exemptions for non-copyright-infringing purposes such as rooting. The 2001 European Copyright Directive implemented the treaty in Europe, requiring member states of the European Union to implement legal protections for technological protection measures. The Copyright Directive includes exceptions to allow breaking those measures for non-copyright-infringing purposes, such as to run alternative software, but member states vary on the implementation of the directive.

=== Australia ===
In 2010, Electronic Frontiers Australia said that it is unclear whether rooting is legal in Australia, and that anti-circumvention laws may apply. These laws were strengthened by the Copyright Amendment Act 2006.

=== Canada ===
In November 2012, Canada amended its Copyright Act with new provisions prohibiting tampering with digital locks, with exceptions including software interoperability. Rooting a device to run alternative software is a form of circumventing digital locks for the purpose of software interoperability.

There had been several efforts from 2008 to 2011 to amend the Copyright Act (Bill C-60, Bill C-61, and Bill C-32) to prohibit tampering with digital locks, along with initial proposals for C-11 that were more restrictive, but those bills were set aside. In 2011, Michael Geist, a Canadian copyright scholar, cited iPhone jailbreaking as a non-copyright-related activity that overly broad Copyright Act amendments could prohibit.

=== European Union ===
The Free Software Foundation Europe argues that it is legal to root or flash any device. According to the European Directive 1999/44/EC, replacing the original operating system with another does not void the statutory warranty that covers the hardware of the device for two years unless the seller can prove that the modification caused the defect.

=== United Kingdom ===
The law Copyright and Related Rights Regulations 2003 makes circumventing DRM protection measures legal for the purpose of interoperability but not copyright infringement. Rooting may be a form of circumvention covered by that law, but this has not been tested in court. Competition laws may also be relevant.

=== India ===
India's copyright law permits circumventing DRM for non-copyright-infringing purposes. Indian Parliament introduced a bill including this DRM provision in 2010 and passed it in 2012 as Copyright (Amendment) Bill 2012. India is not a signatory to the WIPO Copyright Treaty that requires laws against DRM circumvention, but being listed on the US Special 301 Report "Priority Watch List" applied pressure to develop stricter copyright laws in line with the WIPO treaty.

=== New Zealand ===
New Zealand's copyright law allows the circumvention of technological protection measure (TPM) as long as the use is for legal, non-copyright-infringing purposes. This law was added to the Copyright Act 1994 as part of the Copyright (New Technologies) Amendment Act 2008.

=== Singapore ===
Rooting might be legal in Singapore if done to provide interoperability and not circumvent copyright, but that has not been tested in court.

=== United States ===
The Unlocking Consumer Choice and Wireless Competition Act guarantees that consumers can unlock or let others unlock their phones. Under the Digital Millennium Copyright Act (DMCA) rooting was illegal in the United States except by exemption. The U.S. Copyright Office granted an exemption to this law "at least through 2015".

In 2010, in response to a request by the Electronic Frontier Foundation, the U.S. Copyright Office explicitly recognized an exemption to the DMCA to permit rooting. In their ruling, the Library of Congress affirmed on July 26, 2010, that rooting is exempt from DMCA rules with respect to circumventing digital locks. DMCA exemptions must be reviewed and renewed every three years or else they expire.

On October 28, 2012, the US Copyright Office updated their exemption policies. The rooting of smartphones continues to be legal "where circumvention is accomplished for the sole purpose of enabling interoperability of [lawfully obtained software] applications with computer programs on the telephone handset". However, the U.S. Copyright office refused to extend this exemption to tablets, arguing that the term "tablets" is broad and ill-defined, and an exemption to this class of devices could have unintended side effects. The Copyright Office also renewed the 2010 exemption for unofficially unlocking phones to use them on unapproved carriers, but restricted this exemption to phones purchased before January 26, 2013.

Tim Wu, a professor at Columbia Law School, argued in 2007 that jailbreaking is "legal, ethical, and just plain fun". Wu cited an explicit exemption issued by the Library of Congress in 2006 for personal unlocking, which notes that locks "are used by wireless carriers to limit the ability of subscribers to switch to other carriers, a business decision that has nothing whatsoever to do with the interests protected by copyright" and thus do not implicate the DMCA. Wu did not claim that this exemption applies to those who help others unlock a device or "traffic" in software to do so. In 2010 and 2012, the U.S. Copyright Office approved exemptions to the DMCA that allow users to root their devices legally. It is still possible to employ technical countermeasures to prevent rooting or prevent rooted phones from functioning. It is also unclear whether it is legal to traffic in the tools used to make rooting easy.

== See also ==
- Android Dev Phone
- Hacking of consumer electronics
- List of custom Android distributions
