= BharOS =

Indian mobile operating system

BharOS (IndOS)
- Developer: JandK Operations Private Limited, IIT Madras
- OS family: Android (Linux)
- Working state: Current
- Source model: Closed source
- Latest release: BharOS 1
- Marketing target: Smartphones
- Available in: English (India), Hindi, Odia, Punjabi
- Supported platforms: ARM64
- Default user interface: Graphical (multi-touch)

BharOS (formerly IndOS) is a closed-source, Android-based operating system developed by IIT Madras. It is funded by the Indian government, which intends to use it on government and public systems.

== History ==
In 2023, Competition Commission of India (CCI) fined two antitrust cases against Google, the developer of Android. In addition, there have been growing calls for an Indian app store that does not levy exorbitant sales tax; these two factors contributed to the creation of BharOS. It aims to reduce India's dependence on foreign software and promote the use of Indian technology (despite being an Android fork itself).

The operating system was introduced by JandKops, a startup company incubated at IIT Madras. Indian ministers Ashwini Vaishnaw and Dharmendra Pradhan publicly launched the operating system on January 19, 2023.

== Features ==
BharOS targets security-conscious groups and does not come with any preinstalled third-party programs. This approach gives the user 'more freedom and control' over the permissions that are available to apps on their device. Users can choose to grant permissions only to apps that they require to access certain features or data on their device. The software can be installed on commercially available handsets, providing users with a secure environment, the company stated in a statement. The new operating system will provide access to trusted apps via organisation-specific Private App Store Services (PASS), which is a list of curated apps that meet security and privacy standards.

At a panel discussion, Karthik Ayyar, the Director of JandKops, indicated that only applicable security updates will be applied to BharOS devices in closed group networks

== Criticism ==
Divya Bhati writing for India Today noted that instructions on downloading, installing BharOS on compatible devices, or plans for new devices, or its support for security and software updates were scant. In September 2023, a fork of GrapheneOS containing references to BharOS was made public on GitHub. Although the GitHub Profile of Sadhasiva, which hosted the code has since been deleted, it can be viewed through unofficial forks by archival websites. Through a tweet, IITM Pravartak Technologies Foundation identified the code to have originated from Megam Solutions, a Chennai-based software company which was not connected with JandKops. However, IITM Pravartak Technologies Foundation is a client of Megam Solutions. In a subsequent tweet, the organization highlighted communications with the CEO of Megam Solutions, that the name BharOS was unintentionally used.

Ayyar, stated that the operating system would remain closed source software due to "organizational reasons". Ayyar indicated that he did not have the authority to make decisions regarding whether BharOS's source code would be open or closed.
