= Baidu Yi =

Mobile operating system

Baidu Yi OS
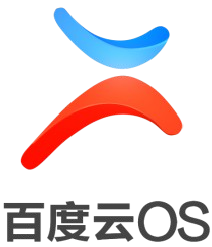
- Developer: Baidu
- Written in: Java
- OS family: Android
- Initial release: September 2, 2011; 14 years ago
- Marketing target: Provides firmware for Android mobile devices
- Supported platforms: ARM
- Default user interface: Graphical user interface
- Official website: os.baidu.com

Baidu Cloud OS (Chinese: 百度云OS; pinyin: Bǎidù Yún OS), also known as Baidu Yi (Chinese: 百度•易平台; pinyin: Bǎidù-Yì píngtái; lit. 'Baidu Yi Platform', 易 Yì meaning "exchange" or "easy"), was a mobile operating system developed by Baidu for smartphones and other mobile devices. Based on the Android platform, it integrated Baidu's cloud services and applications. Baidu later suspended development of the operating system in 2015. It is based on Google's Android but is a fork by Baidu, the dominant search engine operator in China. It was announced on 2 September 2011 at the 2011 Baidu Technology Innovation Conference in Beijing.

== Background ==
At the 2011 Baidu Technology Innovation Conference, Baidu launched its first mobile software platform, Baidu Yi. The OS integrated Baidu's intelligent search, cloud service, and various Baidu apps.

Baidu-Yi was developed especially for domestic Chinese smartphones, built on top of Android but replacing much of the original Google software with the network's own alternatives. There is Ting Music, Baidu Maps instead of Google Maps, The Baidu Yue e-reader, and Google Search has been stripped out and replaced with Baidu Search. In March 2015, Baidu officially stated that Baidu Yun is suspended.

== Features ==
It had Baidu applications, replacing Google's for many core functions, such as the search engine, instant messenger, ebook reader, and app store. Baidu is expected to provide 180 gigabytes of cloud storage for users.

== Functions ==
=== SmartBox Search ===
- Quick Search: Enable searching several seconds after booting to direct users to the targeted content within short time.
- Voice Search: Enable searching while speaking.
- Move Search: Enable searching while reading the content.
- Smart Semantic Analysis: Accurately identify users' needs.
- Local+Cloud Data: Precisely show search results.

=== Cloud Services ===
- Initially 180 GB Storage: Can be upgraded to unlimited storage space.
- Support Local Data Sync and Backup: Support Local documents, pictures, music, and videos synchronization and contacts and program schedule backing up.

=== Local Functions ===
- Smart Dialing (Chinese: 智能拨号): Dials allow indexing by name or phone number.
- Caller Address Display (Chinese: 来电归属地查询): Works on all incoming and outgoing calls.
- Data Monitoring (Chinese: 流量监控): Exact to each program's data analysis and data limit warning.
- Anti Telephone Harassment (Chinese: 来电反骚扰): Prevent users from telephone harassments.
- Blessing SMS (Chinese: 祝福短信): All kinds of blessing SMS for different festivals and vacation allowing users to choose from.
- Anti Charging Malpractice (Chinese: 反恶意吸费): Help identify and remind of charging malpractice.
- Unified Account (Chinese: 统一账号): Only log in once.
- Yi Store (Chinese: 易商店): A variety of apps meeting users needs of entertainment, studying, working, and daily life.

=== Baidu Apps ===
- Ting Music (Chinese: 易Ting)
- Maps (Chinese: 地图)
- Yue e-reader (Chinese: 易阅; pinyin: Yì Yuè; lit. 'easy read', 阅 Yue meaning "read")
- What's Near (Chinese: 身边; pinyin: Shēn Biān; lit. 'by one's side')

== Devices ==
On 6 September 2011, it was reported that Dell was developing new phones that are planned to operate Yi for sale in the Chinese market; Baidu also said that it was working with other unnamed companies, including hardware manufacturers, to support the Yi platform. In December of the same year, Dell launched the Linux-based mobile platform that links with Baidu's Internet services and will also run Android apps.

On 20 December 2011, Dell announced their first Baidu Yi phone model: the Dell Streak 101DL. It is a touchscreen smartphone for the Chinese market that runs the Baidu-Yi platform on Android system and is available on China's Unicom network.

== Demise ==
Baidu's foray into mobile operating systems with Baidu Yi, later rebranded as Baidu Cloud OS, ultimately proved to be short-lived. After its launch in 2011, the Android-based platform struggled to gain significant market traction against the dominant Android ecosystem and offerings from established handset manufacturers. The operating system, which replaced Google's services with Baidu's own suite of applications, failed to attract a substantial user base or widespread manufacturer support beyond a few initial partnerships. Consequently, Baidu officially suspended the project in March 2015, signaling a shift in its mobile strategy.

The company confirmed the end of development for its Android fork on its official Yun OS forums. The discontinuation of Baidu Cloud OS did not, however, mark an exit from mobile for the Chinese tech giant. Instead, Baidu shifted its focus to developing its individual applications and services, such as Baidu Search and Baidu Maps, for the mainstream Android and iOS platforms. This move allowed Baidu to reach a broader audience by concentrating on the software layer within the existing popular mobile operating systems rather than competing with them directly.

== See also ==
- OPhone by China Mobile
