= List of custom Android distributions =

This is a list of Android distributions, or Android-based operating systems, colloquially referred to as Custom ROMs or ROMs forked from the Android Open Source Project (AOSP) without Google Mobile Services licensing that have maintained independent coverage in notable Android-related sources.

The list may include distributions that come pre-installed on a device (stock OS) or alternative aftermarket operating systems.

== Table ==
Name	Developer	Last updated	Open source? (Note: Fully open source Android distributions may ship with proprietary drivers.)	Latest release	Android version	Year started	Supported devices	Notes
Active
BharOS	JandK, IIT Madras	2023	No	Unknown	13 (?)	2023	?	A fork of the Android Open Source Project
CalyxOS	Calyx Institute	2026	Yes	7.2.2	16	2019	Google Pixel 4a (5G) - 9, Fairphone 4 - 5, SHIFTphone 8, Moto G32 - G84	Privacy focused.
crDroid	crDroid team	2026	Yes	12.11	16	2014	485	Based on LineageOS
/e/	e Foundation	2026-11-19	optional proprietary apps	4.5.1	16	2017	287	Privacy focused, smartphones with preinstalled OS commercially available. Forked from LineageOS. Formerly called "Eelo".
emteria.OS	emteria GmbH	2026	Kernel only	16.2	16	2017	ARM and x86 platforms, custom industrial hardware platforms, strong focus on the Raspberry Pi family (5, 4B, 3B, 400, CM, etc.)	Platform for building custom Android ROMs ("emteria.OS") targeted at professional enterprise applications. Supported by a set of remote management and OTA update capabilities ("DeviceHub").
GrapheneOS	GrapheneOS Foundation	2026-08-13	Yes	2026081300	17	2014	Google Pixel 6 and newer, Google Pixel Tablet	Privacy and security-focused. Lead developer worked on CopperheadOS until a dispute between the co-founders over licensing caused his departure.
iodéOS	iodé technologies	2026	Yes	6.0	15	2020	52	Privacy focused and based on LineageOS, comes with a built-in adblocker.
Kali NetHunter	Kali community member "BinkyBear" & Offensive Security	2024-09-11	Yes	2024.3	5.1.1 - 14	2016 (?)	48[1][2][3][4]	Open Source Android penetration testing platform. NetHunter supports Wireless 802.11 frame injection, one-click MANA Evil Access Point setups, HID keyboard, as well as BadUSB MITM attacks – built upon Kali Linux distribution and toolsets.[1][2][3]
LineageOS	LineageOS community	2026	Yes	23.2	16	2016	175	Succeeding CyanogenMod
Paranoid Android	Paranoid Android Team	2024	Yes	Uvite	14	2012	73	Based on CAF
Replicant	Denis Carikli, Paul Kocialkowski	2019	Yes	6.0 0003	6	2010	12	Based on LineageOS, removes or replaces proprietary components and anti-features
Discontinued
AOKP	Team Kang	2020	Yes	Pie	9	2011	115	Based on LineageOS
CyanogenMod	CyanogenMod Open-Source Community, Cyanogen Inc	2016	Yes	14.1 Nightly	7.1.1	2009	571	Succeeded by LineageOS
CopperheadOS	Copperhead Security	2022	Kernel only	13.09.28	13	2014	9	Security- and privacy-focused, no OS analytics by default, smartphones with preinstalled OS commercially available.
DivestOS	Tavi (SkewedZeppelin)	2024	Yes	20	13	2014	178	Soft fork of LineageOS. Includes Monthly Updates, FOSS Focus, Deblobbing, Security and Privacy focus, and F-Droid
Indus OS	Team Indus OS	?	Kernel only	3.0	7	2015	80	
OmniROM	OmniROM community	2025	Yes	16.0	16	2013	Asus ZenFone 7 - 9, Google Pixel 6 & 6 Pro	
LeWa OS	Lewa Technology	?	Kernel only	OS 7 beta	5.1.1	2011	?	
PixelExperience	PixelExperience Team	2024	Yes	14	14	2017	100+	Discontinued in April 2024, Android 14 is a beta
Resurrection Remix OS	Resurrection Remix Team	2021	Yes	8.7.3	10	2012	74	
SlimRoms	SlimRoms Team	2018	Yes	7	7.1	2012	50~	

=== Phone specific distributions ===
These distributions are not intended to run on devices other than a specific manufacturer list.

Name	Developer	Last updated	Open source?	Latest release	Android version	Year started	Supported devices	Notes
Active
ColorOS	OPPO	2026	Kernel only	17.0	17	2013	OPPO, Oneplus, and Realme Android smartphones and tablets	
EMUI	Huawei Technologies Co., Ltd.	2026	kernel only	16	16	2012	Huawei and Honor devices	Also known as Magic UI in most of the high-end Honor devices and the current Honor devices after it split with Huawei.
Fire OS	Amazon.com, Inc.	2025	Partial	14	14	2011	Amazon Kindle Fire, Fire TV, Fire Phone, Amazon Echo	Centered on content consumption, heavy ties to Amazon's store and content.
Xiaomi HyperOS	Xiaomi Corporation	2026	Kernel only	4	17	2023	Xiaomi, Redmi and POCO devices	Succeeding MIUI
MagicOS	Honor	2025	No	10	16	2016	Honor devices	Also known as Magic UI on pre 7.x version, independently developed by Honor for Honor devices after it split with Huawei.
One UI	Samsung Electronics	2026	Kernel only	9.0	17	2019	Samsung smartphones and tablets	Succeeding Samsung Experience
Origin OS	vivo	2026	No	7.0	17	2020	vivo and IQOO devices	Succeeding Funtouch OS
Shift OS l	SHIFT GmbH	2025 (phone 8, 6mq, 5me, 6m)	Yes		15 (phone 8); 13 (6mq); 8.1 (5me, 6m)	2018	4 / 5 (depends on count)	
Shift OS G	SHIFT GmbH	style="background:#FFB; color:black;vertical-align:middle;text-align:center; " class="table-partial"|Google Android		14 (phone 8); 13 (6mq); 8.0 (5me, 6m)	2018	4 / 5 (depends on count)		
Discontinued
AliOS	Alibaba Cloud	2018	Kernel only	2.0	4.4 (?)	style="background: var(--background-color-interactive, #EEE); color: var(--color-base, black); vertical-align: middle; text-align: center; " class="table-Unknown" | ?	A forked but incompatible version of Android	
Baidu Yi	Baidu, Inc.	2015	Kernel only	Unknown	4 (?)	2011	Discontinued in March 2015	
Funtouch OS	vivo	2024	No	15	15	2013	vivo and IQOO devices	Succeeded by Origin OS
HarmonyOS	Huawei Technologies Co., Ltd.	2024	Kernel only	4.3 (last version embodying AOSP)	12	2019	Huawei and Honor devices	HarmonyOS 5 onwards no longer includes AOSP.
OxygenOS	OnePlus	2025	Partial	16.0	16	2015	OnePlus smartphones and tablets	Merged with HydrogenOS in 2018. Using ColorOS codebase from 12.0 release. Merged with ColorOS
Realme UI	Realme	2025	Kernel only	7.0	16	2020	Realme devices	Based on ColorOS. Merged with ColorOS
Smartisan OS	Smartisan	2020	Partial	8.0	10	2012	15	

== See also ==
- Comparison of mobile operating systems
- Comparison of Linux distributions
- ClockworkMod – custom recovery image
- Team Win Recovery Project (TWRP) – custom recovery image
