= Pre-installed software =

Software already installed and licensed on a computer by OEM

Pre-installed software (also known as bundled software) is software already installed and licensed on a computer or smartphone bought from an original equipment manufacturer (OEM). The operating system is usually factory-installed, but because it is a general requirement, this term is used for additional software apart from the bare necessary amount, usually from other sources (or the operating system vendor).

Unwanted factory-installed software (also known as crapware or bloatware) can include major security vulnerabilities, like Superfish, which installs a root certificate to inject advertising into encrypted Google search pages, but leaves computers vulnerable to serious cyberattacks that breach the security used in banking and finance websites.

Some mirror sites for freeware use unwanted software bundling that similarly installs unwanted software.

== Unwanted software ==
Often new PCs come with factory-installed software which the manufacturer was paid to include, but is of dubious value to the purchaser. Most of these programs are included without the user's knowledge, and have no instructions on how to opt-out or remove them.

A Microsoft executive mentioned that within the company these applications were dubbed craplets (a portmanteau of crap and applet). He suggested that the experience of people buying a new Windows computer can be damaged by poorly designed, uncertified third-party applications installed by vendors. He stated that the antitrust case against Microsoft prevented the company from stopping the pre-installation of these programs by OEMs. Walt Mossberg, technology columnist for The Wall Street Journal, condemned "craplets" in two columns published in April 2007, and suggested several possible strategies for removing them.

The bundling of these unwanted applications is often performed in exchange for financial compensation, paid to the OEM by the application's publisher. At the 2007 Consumer Electronics Show, Dell defended this practice, stating that it keeps costs down, and implying that systems might cost significantly more to the end user if these programs were not factory-installed. Some system vendors and retailers will offer, for an additional charge, to remove unwanted factory-installed software from a newly purchased computer; retailers, in particular, will tout this service as a "performance improvement." In 2008, Sony Corporation announced a plan to charge end users US$50 for the service; Sony subsequently decided to drop the charge for this service and offer it for free after many users expressed outrage. Microsoft Store similarly offers a range of "Signature Edition" computers sold in a similar state, as well as extended warranty and support packages through Microsoft.

=== On smartphones ===
Mobile phones typically come with factory-installed software provided by its manufacturer or mobile network operator; similarly to their PC equivalents, they are sometimes tied to account management or other premium services offered by the provider. The practice was extended to smartphones via Android, as carriers often bundle apps provided by themselves and third-party developers with the device and, furthermore, install them into the System partition, making it so that they cannot be completely removed from the device without performing unsupported modifications to its firmware (such as rooting) first.

Some of these apps may run in the background, consuming battery life, and may also duplicate functionality already provided by the phone itself; for example, Verizon Wireless has bundled phones with a redundant text messaging app known as "Messages+" (which is set as the default text messaging program in lieu of the stock messaging app included within the OS), and VZ Navigator (a subscription service redundant to the free Google Maps service). In addition, apps bundled by OEMs may also include special system-level permissions that bypass those normally enforced by the operating system.

Android 4.0 attempted to address these issues by allowing users to "disable" apps—which hides them from application menus and prevents them from running. However, this does not remove the software from the device entirely, and they still consume storage unless they are removed via unsupported modifications. Android 5.0 began to allow carrier apps to be automatically downloaded from Google Play Store during initial device setup instead; they are installed the same way as user-downloaded apps, and can be uninstalled normally.

Although Apple does not allow operators to customize the iPhone in this manner, the company has faced criticism for including an increasing number of factory-installed apps in iOS that cannot be removed.

== Legal considerations ==
- In April 2014, South Korea implemented new regulatory guidelines for the mobile phone industry, requiring non-essential apps bundled on a smartphone to be user-removable.
- In December 2019, Russia passed a law effective 1 July 2020, which requires that specific types of consumer electronics devices be factory-installed with applications developed by Russian vendors. The goal of this law is to discourage the use of foreign competitors.

== See also ==
- Tying (commerce) – Commerce practice
  - Product bundling – Offering several products as one
    - Bundled software – Offering several products as one
    - wikt:bundleware
- Shovelware – Poor-quality software collection
- Application software – Any computer program for end-user use
