= Magisk (software) =

Systemless root solution for Android

- Screenshot Screenshot of the Magisk 31.0 home page
- Original author: John Wu (topjohnwu)
- Release: August 2016; 10 years ago
- Stable release: 30.7 / February 23, 2026; 8 months ago
- Preview release: 31.0 / September 4, 2026; 55 days ago
- Written in: C++, Kotlin, Rust
- Operating system: Android
- Platform: Android
- License: GPL-3.0
- Website: github.com/topjohnwu/Magisk
- Repository: github.com/topjohnwu/Magisk

Magisk is a free and open-source software used for userspace systemless rooting of Android devices, developed by topjohnwu. Magisk supports devices running Android 7.0 or higher.

== Overview ==
Magisk is a free and open-source software that enables users to gain root access to their Android devices. With Magisk, users can install various modifications and customizations, making it a popular choice for Android enthusiasts. Additionally, Magisk comes with a built-in Magisk Manager app, which allows users to manage root permissions and install various modules.

Magisk has a modular design and uses magic mounts for a systemless approach; it offers a way to root an Android device.

== How it works ==
Users download their firmware (init_boot.img or boot.img) and use Magisk to patch the file. After unlocking the bootloader, the patched file is flashed by using fastboot or Odin (for Samsung devices). By doing so, Magisk gains root access by replacing init with magiskinit in the booting process of Android devices.

== History ==
Magisk started out as a small project created by John Wu. However, it has now grown to more than 252 contributors. In version 21, support for Android 11 was added. In version 22, support for the Samsung Galaxy S21 was added. In version 26, support for Android 5 and below was removed. The original developer John Wu started working for the Android security team in May 2021.

== See also ==
- Bootloader unlocking
- KernelSU
- SuperSU
