= CalyxOS =

Free and open-source privacy-focused operating system based on Android

- Developer: The Calyx Institute
- OS family: Android (Linux)
- Working state: Current
- Source model: Open source
- Latest release: 8.0.5.20 / November 9, 2026; 2 days ago
- Repository: gitlab.com/CalyxOS
- Update method: Over-the-air (OTA), ROM flashing
- Package manager: APK-based
- Supported platforms: arm, arm64
- Kernel type: Monolithic (Linux)
- Official website: calyxos.org

CalyxOS is an Android-based operating system for select smartphones, foldables and tablets with mostly free and open-source software. It is produced by the Calyx Institute as part of its mission to "defend online privacy, security and accessibility."

CalyxOS preserves the Android security model, using Android's Verified Boot system of cryptographic signing of the operating system, and running with a locked bootloader. CalyxOS also features an installer that guides the user through the process of unlocking and then re-locking the bootloader.

== History ==
The Calyx Institute annual reports state CalyxOS was publicly launched during their 2018–2019 fiscal year. Inspiration included Tails and Qubes OS, and goals were said to be "completely open source", removing proprietary Google tracking, and including apps Tor, Signal and CalyxVPN for increased privacy.

CalyxOS supports select Google Pixel, Motorola and Fairphone devices, while offering "extended support" for some older Google Pixel devices and the SHIFT SHIFT6mq.

Around April 2022, CalyxOS announced support for the Fairphone 4, OnePlus 8T, 9, and 9 Pro. However, in May 2022, CalyxOS announced OnePlus builds were pulled because the bootloader could no longer be relocked on newer devices firmware.

In March 2024, CalyxOS added support for the Fairphone 5.

On August 1, 2025, the Calyx Institute published a letter which announced that CalyxOS development had been paused. The development pause was due to Calyx Institute founder, Nicholas Merrill and CalyxOS tech lead, Chirayu Desai leaving the organization. An update to the letter on August 5, 2025, recommended that current users uninstall CalyxOS, due to the lack of security updates during the development pause. On July 1, 2026, the project announced that it would resume development with new releases.

In September 2026, CalyxOS added support for the Fairphone 6.

== Software ==
Software name	Feature(s)	Notes
Aurora Store	Alternative to the standard Google Play Store	Aurora Store uses the same standard catalog of apps and installs apps directly from the Google servers to phone. CalyxOS gives Aurora Store special privileges so that app updates can be automatically installed.
Chromium	FOSS web browser	Bromite fork, succeeded DuckDuckGo mobile browser as the default web browser in June 2022.
F-Droid Basic	Repository of FOSS applications for the Android platform	CalyxOS includes a version of F-Droid called "F-Droid Basic" which allows for streamlined app updates, installs, and uninstalls without elevated privileges.
MicroG	FOSS implementation of proprietary Google Play Services	Some apps dependent on Google Play Services may not work with MicroG, use of MicroG is optional.
CoMaps	Navigation app with privacy	A privacy-focused navigation app for driving, hiking, and cycling. The application uses OpenStreetMap for its map data. It can download maps on the device to be used for location information and navigation without an internet connection.
Seedvault	Encrypted backup and restore application for Android	The Calyx Institute sponsored development of SeedVault and an annual report states they "debuted SeedVault" during their 2019-2020 fiscal year. SeedVault is also used by LineageOS.
Signal	Encrypted calling/messaging app	Free, privacy-focused messaging and voice talk app, preinstalled as messaging app in CalyxOS.

CalyxOS ships with MicroG as an open-source alternative to the Google Mobile Services, including Mozilla Location Services as an optional replacement to the location services provided by Google, but gives the user the option to disable microG and its location services.

== Reception ==
In October 2020, Moritz Tremmel reviewed CalyxOS. A month later, Tremmel explained why he preferred CalyxOS over LineageOS. A year later in September 2021, Tremmel further explained how CalyxOS was different from other ROMs because it did not require as much "fiddling". Rahul Nambiampurath, writing for MakeUseOf in March 2021, termed CalyxOS, "[one of the] best [Android] ROMs for privacy ... offers the perfect middle ground between convenience and privacy". In August 2021, Android Authority wrote CalyxOS "puts privacy and security into the hands of everyday users."

In 2022, the book c't Sicher ins Netz: How to block out monitors and attackers, said "CalyxOS is one of the youngest custom ROMs, it will only celebrate its second birthday in summer 2022. With a built-in Datura firewall, VPN and Cloudflare DNS, Calyx promises more security than some other mobile systems."

In 2023, CalyxOS was the one alternative phone operating system recommended by Carey Parker in the book Firewalls Don't Stop Dragons.

== See also ==
- Comparison of mobile operating systems
- List of custom Android distributions
- List of security-focused operating systems
- Guardian Project
