= Fairphone =

Dutch smartphone manufacturer

Fairphone B.V.
- Logo used since 2025
- Type: Private
- Industry: Telecommunications equipment
- Founded: January 2013; 13 years ago
- Founder: Tessa Wernink; Bas van Abel
- Headquarters: Amsterdam, Netherlands
- Area served: United States, and Western and Central Europe (except Malta and Cyprus)
- Key people: Bas van Abel (co-founder); Miquel Ballester Salvà (co-founder); Raymond van Eck (CEO)
- Products: Smartphones, headphones
- Revenue: ▲€73 million (2025)
- Number of employees: 129 (2025)
- Website: www.fairphone.com

Fairphone is a Dutch electronics manufacturer that designs and produces smartphones and headphones. It aims to minimise the ethical and environmental impact of its devices by using recycled, fairtrade and conflict-free materials, maintaining fair labour conditions throughout its workforce and suppliers, and enabling users to easily repair their devices through modular design and by providing replacement parts, getting a repair score of 10/10 from iFixit on most of its products. As of August 2026, the company's most recent smartphone is the Fairphone 6+, a highly modular and easily repairable device for which it plans to provide seven years of Android OS updates and eight years of security patches, as well as a five-year warranty.

Fairphone has been dubbed "the most ethical smartphone in the world", scoring 98 out of 100 possible points by the British magazine Ethical Consumer.

== History ==
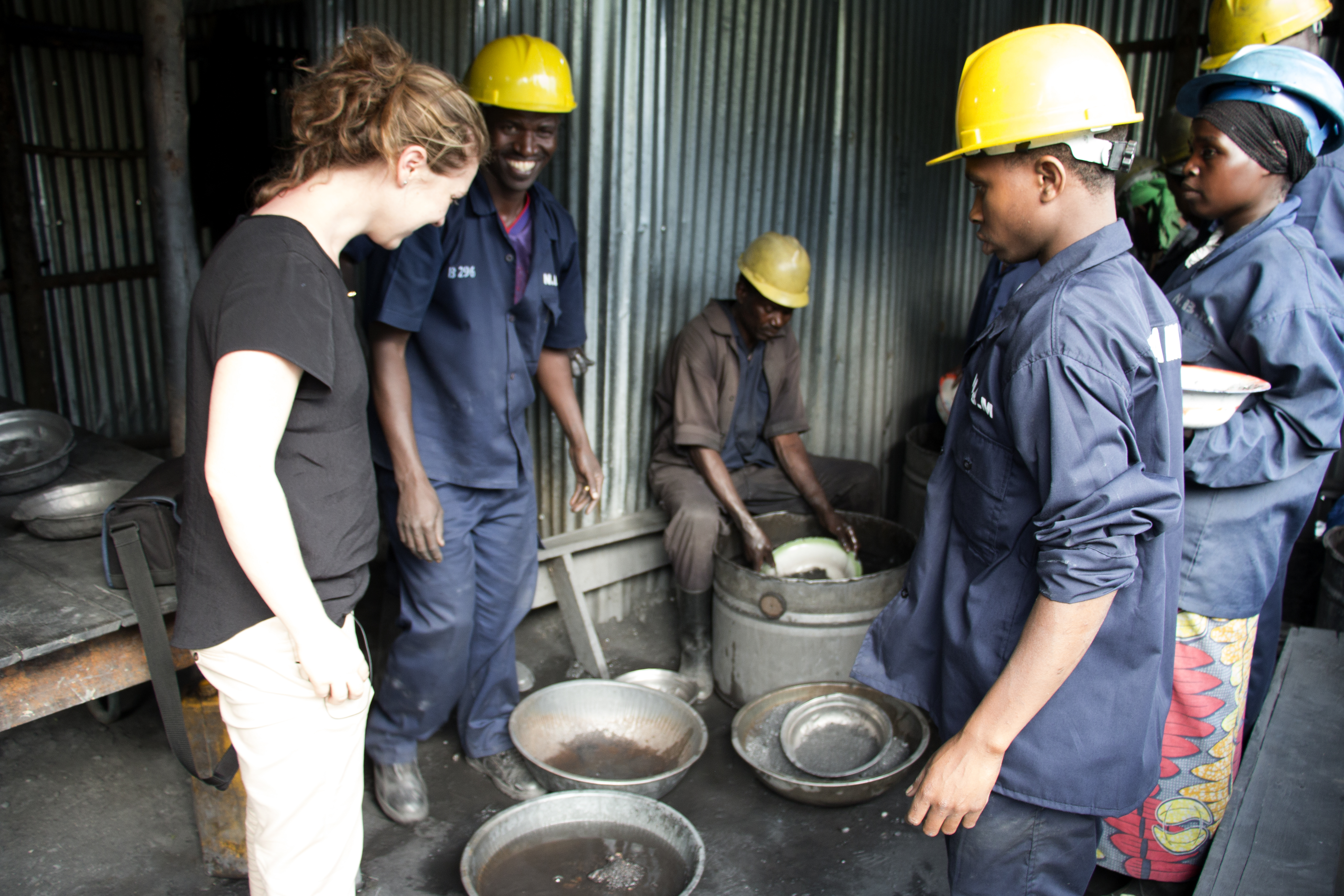
A Fairphone employee meeting tungsten miners at the New Bugarama Mining Company in Rwanda

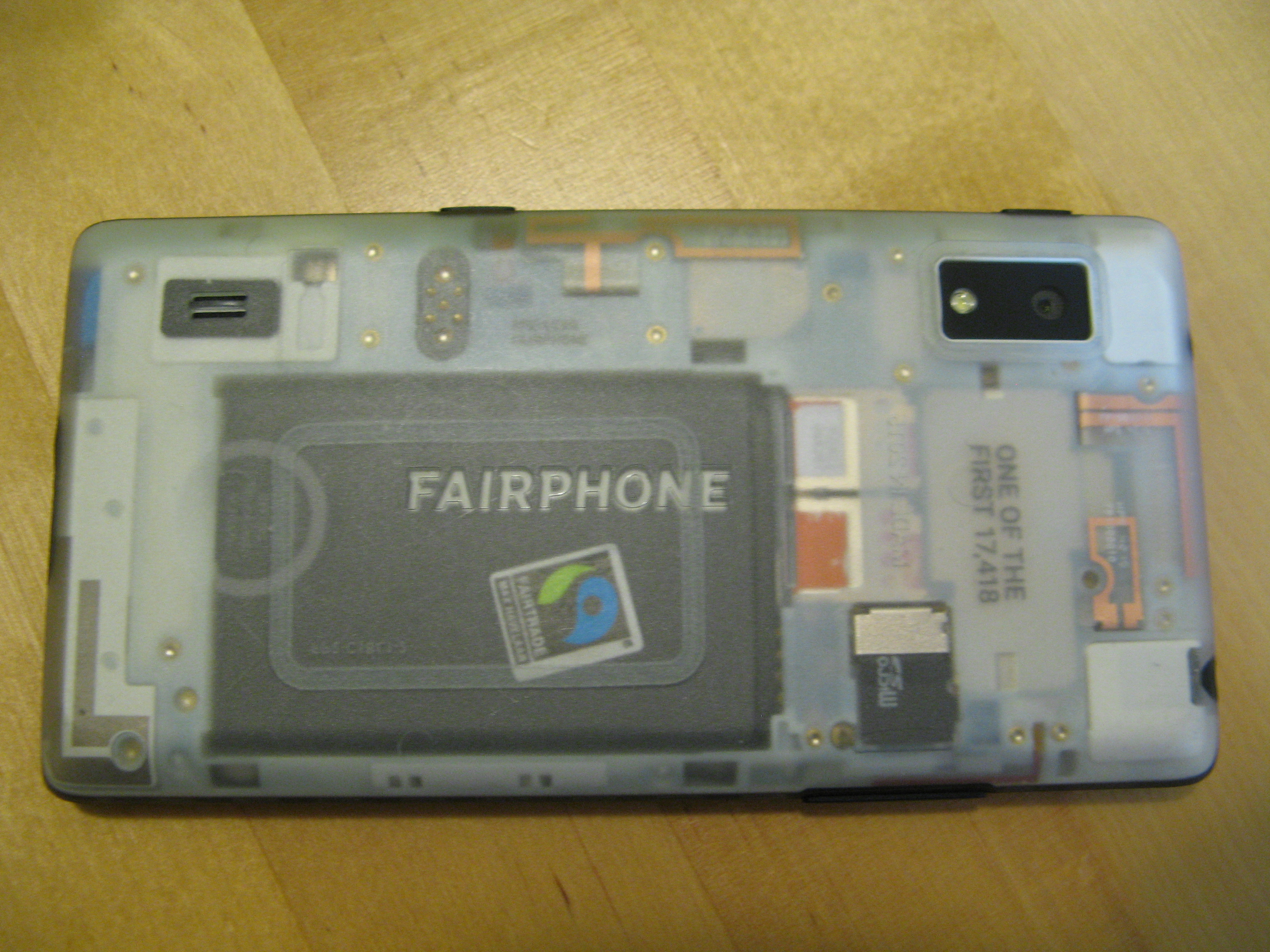
Back of a Fairphone 2 with transparent cover, showing its modular design

Fairphone was founded by Bas van Abel, Tessa Wernink and Miquel Ballester as a social enterprise company in January 2013, having existed as a campaign for two and a half years.

In April 2015, the company became a registered B Corporation.

Since version two, the Fairphone is produced in Suzhou, China, by Hi-P International Limited.

In November 2021, the Fairphone 4 was made available.

As of February 2022, Fairphone had sold around 400,000 devices.

In 2023, a consortium of impact investors led by new shareholders Invest-NL, the ABN AMRO Sustainable Impact Fund, and existing shareholder Quadia, with its Regenero Impact Fund, invested €49 million in Fairphone.

In August 2026, Fairphone made its official debut in the United States with the release of the Fairphone 6+. The company released Fairbuds 2, wireless earbuds, in 2026.

== Products ==
List of Fairphone models
Name	Release date	SoC	CPU			GPU		Memory (GB)	Storage (GB)	Display				Camera		Initial Android version	Battery capacity (mAh)
Name	Release date	SoC	Type	Speed (GHz)	Cores	Type	Speed (MHz)	Memory (GB)	Storage (GB)	Size (inches)	PPI	resolution (px)	type	Rear	Front	Initial Android version	Battery capacity (mAh)
Fairphone 1	Dec 2013	MediaTek MT6589	Cortex-A7	1.2	4	PowerVR SGX544MP	286	1	16 +up to 64GB	4.3	256	960×540	IPS	8MP	1.3MP	4.2.2	2000
Fairphone 2	Dec 2015	Qualcomm Snapdragon 801	Krait 400	2.26	4	Adreno 330	578	2	32 +up to 2TB	5	446	1080×1920	IPS	12MP	5MP	5.1	2420
Fairphone 3	Sep 2019	Qualcomm Snapdragon 632	Kryo 250; Gold+Silver	1.8+1.8	4+4	Adreno 506	600	4	64 +up to 2TB	5.65	427	1080×2160	IPS	12MP	8MP	9	3060
Fairphone 3+	Sep 2020	Qualcomm Snapdragon 632	Kryo 250; Gold+Silver	1.8+1.8	4+4	Adreno 506	600	4	64 +up to 2TB	5.65	427	1080×2160	IPS	48MP (12MP output)	16MP	10	3060
Fairphone 4	30 Sep 2021	Qualcomm Snapdragon 750G	Kryo 570; Gold+Silver	2.2+1.8	2+6	Adreno 619	950	6/8	128/256 +up to 2TB	6.3	409	1080×2340	IPS	48MP OIS, 48 MP ultrawide, (ToF + colour) sensor	25MP	11	3905
Fairphone 5	30 Aug 2023	Qualcomm Snapdragon QCM6490	Kryo 670; Prime+Gold+Silver	2.7+2.4+1.9	1+3+4	Adreno 643	812	6/8	128/256 +up to 2TB	6.46	459	1224×2700	OLED 90 Hz	50MP OIS, 50 MP ultrawide, (ToF + colour) sensor	50MP	13	4200
Fairphone 6 (Note: Announced as "The Fairphone (Gen. 6)")	25 June 2025	Qualcomm Snapdragon 7s Gen 3	Kryo 7s Gen 3 Prime+Gold+Silver	2.5+2.4+1.8	1+3+4	Adreno 810	1050	8	256 +up to 2TB	6.31	431	1116×2484	OLED 120 Hz	50MP, 13 MP ultrawide	32MP	15	4415
Fairphone 6+	18 Aug 2026	Qualcomm Snapdragon 7s Gen 4	Kryo 7s Gen 4 Prime+Gold+Silver	2.7+2.4+1.8	1+3+4	Adreno 810	940	12	256 +up to 2TB	6.31	431	1116×2484	LTPO OLED 10-120 Hz	50MP, 13 MP ultrawide	32MP	16	4415

== Corporate affairs ==
Since the introduction of the Fairphone 3 in 2019, Fairphone has reported steadily increasing annual sales, surpassing 100,000 units sold in both 2022 and 2023. The company’s best-selling year to date was 2025, with 145,259 units sold. In 2024, sales slightly exceeded the company's internal goal of 100,000 units, reaching 103,053 units sold.

Fairphone's revenues grew significantly between 2018 and 2022, rising from €10.8 million in 2018 to a peak of €58.9 million in 2022. However, the company faced a challenging year in 2023, when it recorded negative earnings before interest, taxes, depreciation and amortisation (EBITDA) of €14.3 million despite revenues of €54.8 million. In 2024, the company returned to profitability with a positive EBITDA of €1.7 million on revenues of €54.4 million.

Fairphone sales, revenue and earnings (2018–2025)
Year	Units sold	Revenue (€)	EBITDA (€)
2018	22,623	10,822,000	–5,592,000
2019	53,844	19,185,000	–4,590,000
2020	94,985	35,930,000	3,732,900
2021	87,936	40,457,000	5,687,000
2022	115,681	58,899,000	4,483,900
2023	100,107	54,723,920	–14,271,900
2024	103,053	54,350,254	1,745,838
2025	145,259	73,300,139	165,477

== Social impact and competitors ==
The phone is modular, which makes it easily repairable and customisable by the user, in keeping with right to repair principles. According to the company, increasing the lifespan of a phone by two years reduces CO_{2} emissions by 30%.

The gold and silver in Fairphone 4 has the Fairtrade label, and metals used are said to come from conflict-free mines. The company promises a 5-year warranty period and long-term support for software updating and spare parts. In 2017, Fairphone's co-founder Bas van Abel acknowledged that it was currently impossible to produce a 100% fair phone, suggesting it was more accurate to call his company's phones "fairer".

In an interview with Will Georgi, Fairphone co-founder Tessa Wernink mentions:

There might be a misconception that as a social enterprise, we don't operate like a "normal" business, but that’s not true. In many ways, most of our choices are the same — we still need to make money and sell phones — but the outcome and the goals are different. Our focus is investing in social innovation, instead of purely technical innovation. When other phone companies design a new phone, they research new technology — we research supply chain improvement.

A survey conducted by Franziska Verna Haucke in the Journal of Cleaner Production found:

A sustainable lifestyle represents the dominant factor explaining the involvement with the Fairphone. Surprisingly, the findings show that alternative consumption seems to negatively influence the involvement with the Fairphone and social commitment seems to play a minor role in the model. These aspects point to the Fairphone as a technical artifact, centered on a choice for a sustainable lifestyle.

Shiftphone is another small mobile telephone manufacturer with a focus on sustainability, who also developed a modular smartphone. The founder of Shiftphone considers that the two companies working in collaboration could have more influence on bigger competitors.

== Recognition and certifications ==
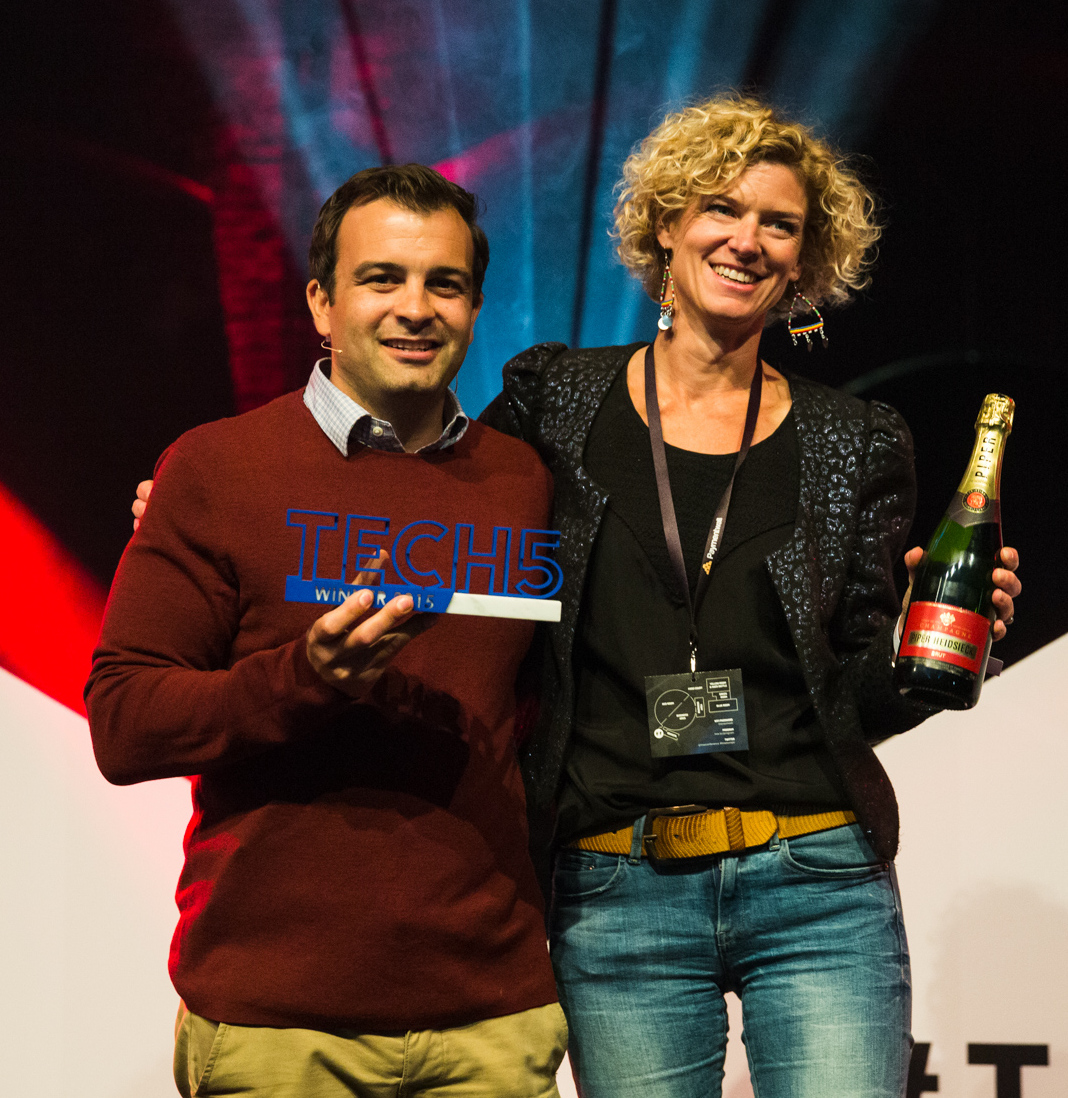
Tessa Wernink (right) receiving the Tech5 award at The Next Web Conference 2015

In 2016, Fairphone's co-founder and first CEO Bas van Abel was one of the three recipients of the German Environmental Prize.

The Fairphone 4 was one of the first TCO Certified smartphones, receiving its designation in 2021. However, the company had previously suggested its phones exceeded the TCO Certified criteria; indeed, a 2015 side-by-side comparison conducted by Südwind Association, the Centre for Research on Multinational Corporations, and the GoodElectronics Network, found the Fairphone 1 to exceed industry standards on more sustainability and social criteria than even the TCO Certified label.

Fairphone has also received three consecutive annual Platinum ratings from EcoVadis, scoring as high as 88/100 in a rating system that covers four different categories measuring environmental and social metrics. This score placed Fairphone among the top 1% of businesses rated by EcoVadis worldwide.

== Operating systems ==
Fairphones can run several operating systems, including CalyxOS, DivestOS, /e/, iodéOS, LineageOS, Ubuntu Touch, and more. Murena, the company associated with the /e/ foundation, also sells Fairphones with /e/ pre-installed and offers a warranty for them. As of July 2026 the official /e/ support for FP3, FP5 and FP6 is based on Android 15, while FP4 remains on Android 14.

== See also ==
- Ethical consumerism
- Fair trade
- Framework Computer
- Green computing
- Open-source hardware
- Shiftphone
- Phonebloks
