= Shiftphone =

Modular smartphone series

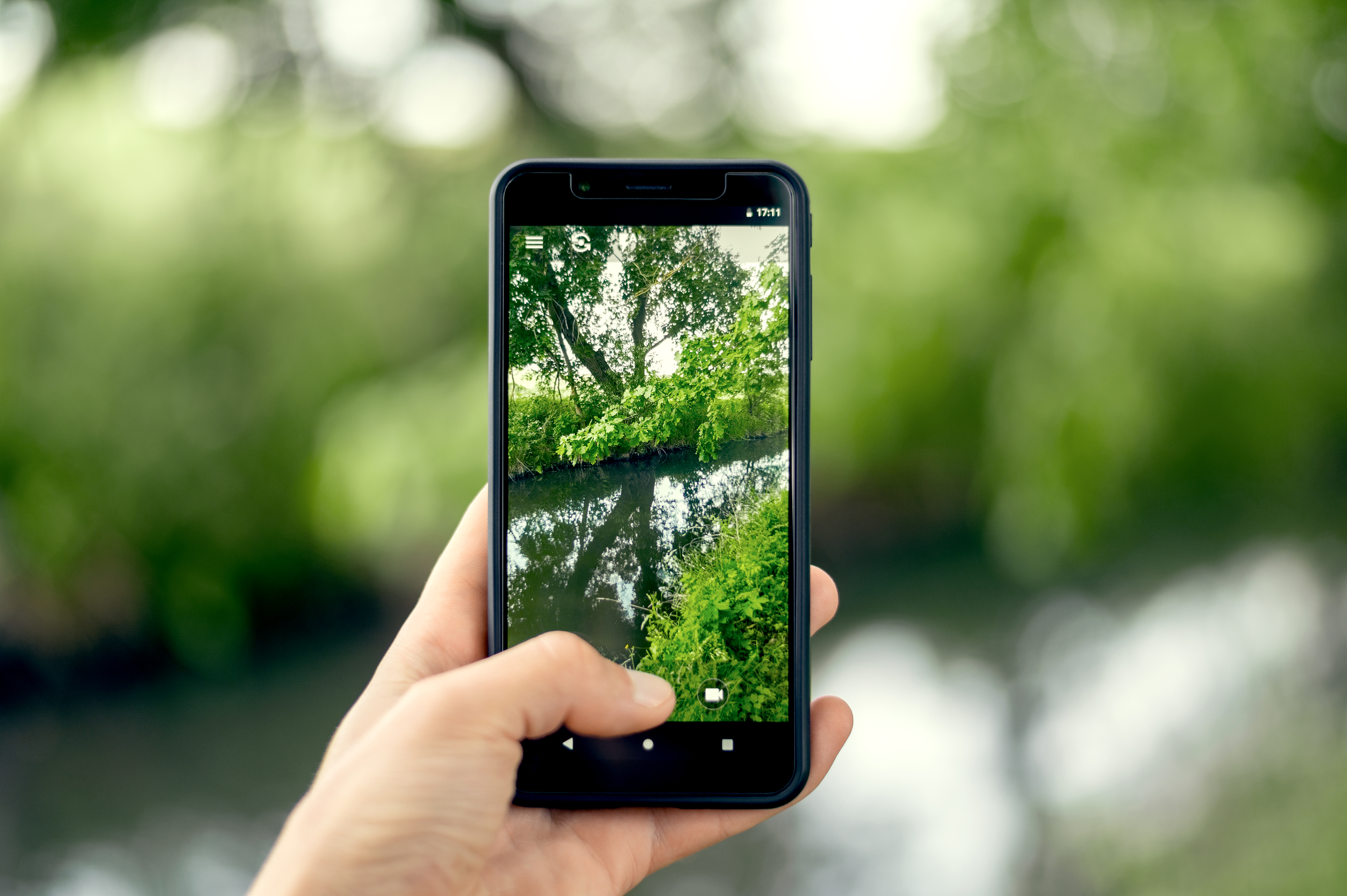
SHIFT6mq

Shiftphone is a modular, easy-to-repair smartphone brand created by the company SHIFT in Germany. The company emphasizes fair trade and ecology, similar to Fairphone. Instead of tantalum capacitors made from coltan, ceramic capacitors are used for their manufacturing. So far, eleven model series have been released. The latest device is the SHIFTphone 8, released in 2024, succeeding the Shift6mq.

== Names ==
The official company name is SHIFT GmbH.

=== Model names ===
The names of models start with the string "SHIFT" in upper case letters.

Except for the SHIFTphone 8 this is followed by the length of the display diagonal rounded to full inches. After that

- the name ends - for the oldest models
- a dot follows, in turn followed by a number - some newer models until around 2017
- an m follows - this is for the new modular line

=== OS name ===
The OS is named either SHIFT-OS or ShiftOS.

== Devices ==
Year of release	Name	Notes
2014	Shift7	
2015	Shift4	
2015	Shift5	
2015	Shift5.1	
2016	Shift5.2	
2016	Shift7+	
2017	Shift4.2	
2017	Shift5.3	
2018	Shift6m	"m" for modular - the first modular shiftphone and was awarded the highest national award for ecological design in Germany, the Bundespreis Ecodesign, in the category "product".
2019	Shift5me	"e" for Economy
2020	Shift6mq	"q" for Qualcomm, the first to use a Qualcomm SoC
2025 end of May/beginning of June (expected)	Shiftphone 8	"8" for model eight (not counting the dot-versions). It is planned to be the first shiftphone model of which the name has no reference to the length of the display diagonale, that is IP67 certified and has no 3.5 mm headphone jack. It is planned to use the Qualcomm QCM6490 SoC, the same as the Fairphone 5.

== Operating system ==
There are two different operating systems. The SafetyNet based SHIFT-OS-G/ShiftOS-G with Google services or the AOSP-based ShiftOS or ShiftOS-L without Google services. Furthermore, flashing the device with a custom ROM is allowed; ShiftOS developers are also partly involved in the development of certain custom ROMs.

== Characteristics ==
=== Sustainability ===
Shiftphones are built modularly so customers can change parts and repair the device without voiding the warranty. Videos support the user in repairing their device, explaining how to open it and how to change certain modules.

=== Circular economy ===
Customers have the option, to upgrade their device to a different model.

Shiftphone partners with Closing the Loop.

=== Privacy aspects ===
The operating system can be replaced with a custom ROM based on Linux (Mobian) or a de-googled Android.

Different from the competitors PinePhone and Librem, the motherboard and peripherals are not open-source hardware. This makes hardware backdoors still possible.

The SHIFTphone 8 does include hardware kill switches, for example for the microphone and camera.

=== Workers' care ===
Shift employees in China do not work more than 50 hours a week, while it is common for people to work up to 90. Compared to the average Chinese worker in the manufacturing business, the staff is provided with insurances.

== Criticism and controversies about conflict minerals ==
In 2016 c't described the Shift5 as a typical cheap smartphone. Besides, the journal argued that there was no evidence that coltan is not used in Shiftphones and thus criticized the transparency of SHIFT. SHIFT and further secondary sources claim that coltan is not in use for their manufacturing. However, according to c't, the SHIFT partner company "Vstar and Weihuaxin" did not provide information about conflict-free material used in Shiftphone. Unlike Shiftphone, Fairphone provides detailed audit reports about component suppliers through a Chinese agency, and also facilitates detailed information on problems and compromises in the supply chain.

Coltan is used to make components for mobile phones and other electronic devices. A huge part of the ore is from mines in the DRC (Democratic Republic of Congo). "Much mining has been done in small artisanal mining operations, sometimes known as Artisanal and Small-Scale Mining (ASM). These small-scale mines are unregulated, with high levels of child labor and workplace injury." Some 50,000 children, some just seven years old, work in Congo's coltan mines. Workers often have little or no protection and often work underground in self-made shafts.

golem.de reported in detail on the company and its efforts in terms of sustainability and fairness in June 2018.

The ProSieben magazine Galileo tested the newly released smartphone Shift6m and illuminated, in the form of video recordings, the production conditions of the in-house manufactory located in China in June 2018.

N-tv described the initial efforts for fairness and sustainability as well as the history of the Shiftphone, in September 2018.

In August 2018, the ecology portal Utopia.de no longer reported any lack of transparency regarding Shift's Chinese hardware manufacturing process.

In the issue 15/2018, the computer magazine c't showed a more positive approach on the topic of German smartphone manufacturer Shift, although the report itself was rather short in comparison to other European hardware providers.

== See also ==
- Fairphone
- Ethical consumerism
- Fair trade
- Green IT
- Open-source hardware
- Phonebloks
- Framework Computer
