= Google Mobile Services =

Google's proprietary software bundle on the Android platform

Android icon (since 2023)

Google Mobile Services (GMS) is a collection of proprietary applications and application programming interfaces (APIs) developed by Google for use on Android. The suite of Google Mobile Services are pre-installed on most Android devices, such as smartphones, tablets, and smart TVs.

GMS is backed by the core background components Google Play Services and low-level ones like Google Services Framework. A variety of APIs are included that are essential in making user-facing Android apps and services, including all of Google's and many third-party ones (that are built on and rely on GMS), functional. Examples include push notifications (Firebase Cloud Messaging), location tracking and in-app maps, and device security certification (Play Integrity API).

== Licensing ==
GMS is entirely proprietary and is not a part of the Android Open Source Project (AOSP), which means a device manufacturer needs to obtain a license from Google in order to legally pre-install GMS on an Android device. This license is provided by Google without any licensing fees except in the EU.

== Core user applications ==
The following are core applications that are part of Google Mobile Services:

- Google Search
- Google Chrome
- YouTube
- Google Play Store
- Google Drive
- Gmail
- Google Meet
- Google Maps
- Google Photos
- Google TV
- YouTube Music

=== Historically ===
- Google+
- Google Hangouts
- Google Wallet
- Google Play Magazines
- Google Play Music
- Google Play Movies & TV
- Google Duo

== Core background and system packages ==
These may include:

- Google Play Services or GmsCore (com.google.android.gms)
- Google Services Framework (com.google.android.gsf)
- Google Play Store or Phonesky (com.google.vending)
- Google Account Manager (com.google.android.gsf.login)
- Android System Webview (com.google.android.webview)
- Google Partner Setup (com.google.android.partnersetup)
- Google Backup Transport (com.google.android.backuptransport)

== Reception, competitors, and regulators ==
=== FairSearch ===
Numerous European firms filed a complaint to the European Commission stating that Google had manipulated their power and dominance within the market to push their Services to be used by phone manufacturers. The firms were joined under the name FairSearch, and the main firms included were Microsoft, Expedia, TripAdvisor, Nokia and Oracle. FairSearch's major problem with Google's practices was that they believed Google were forcing phone manufacturers to use their Mobile Services. They claimed Google managed this by asking these manufacturers to sign a contract stating that they must preinstall specific Google Mobile Services, such as Maps, Search and YouTube, in order to get the latest version of Android. Google swiftly responded stating that they "continue to work co-operatively with the European Commission".

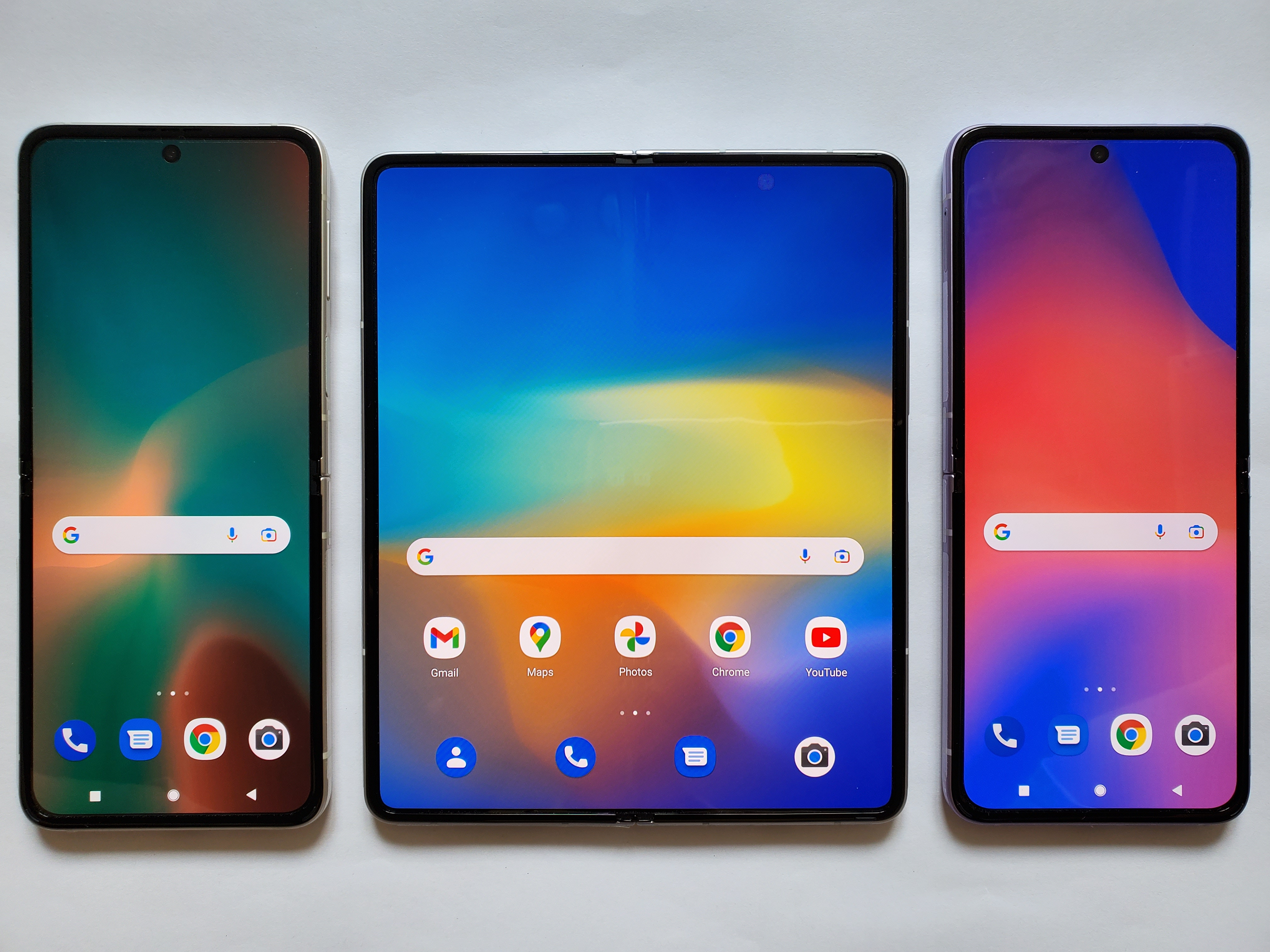
Android smartphones with built-in Google mobile services

=== Aptoide ===
The third-party Android app store Aptoide also filed an EU competition complaint against Google once again stating that they are misusing their power within the market. Aptoide alleged that Google was blocking third-party app stores from being on Google Play, as well as blocking Google Chrome from downloading any third-party apps and app stores. As of June 2014, Google had not responded to these allegations.

=== Abuse of Android dominance ===
In May 2019, Umar Javeed, Sukarma Thapar, Aaqib Javeed vs. Google LLC & Ors. the Competition Commission of India ordered an antitrust probe against Google for abusing its dominant position with Android to block market rivals. In Prima Facie opinion the commission held that mandatory pre-installation of the entire Google Mobile Services (GMS) suite, under Mobile Application Distribution Agreements (MADA), amounts to the imposition of unfair conditions on the device manufacturers.

=== EU antitrust ruling ===
On July 18, 2018, the European Commission fined Google €4.34 billion for breaching EU antitrust rules which resulted in a change of licensing policy for the GMS in the EU. A new paid licensing agreement for smartphones and tablets shipped into the EEA was created. The change is that the GMS is now decoupled from the base Android and will be offered under a separate paid licensing agreement.

=== Privacy policy ===
At the same time, Google faced problems with various European data protection agencies, most notably In the United Kingdom and France. The problem they faced was that they had a set of 60 rules merged into one, which allowed Google to "track users more closely". Google once again came out and stated that their new policies still abide by European Union laws.

=== Android distributions without Google Mobile Services ===
After surveillance and privacy concerns, several custom android distributions have been implemented, such as GrapheneOS, LineageOS, CalyxOS, iodéOS or /e/OS, and they come either without any GMS installed by default or with microG, that adds a compatibility layer.

== See also ==
- DeGoogle
- Google Play Services
- Huawei Mobile Services
- List of Android apps by Google
- MicroG
- Microsoft mobile services
- Sandboxed Google Play Services
