= Fairphone 3 =

Third phone model of the company Fairphone

Fairphone 3 & Fairphone 3+
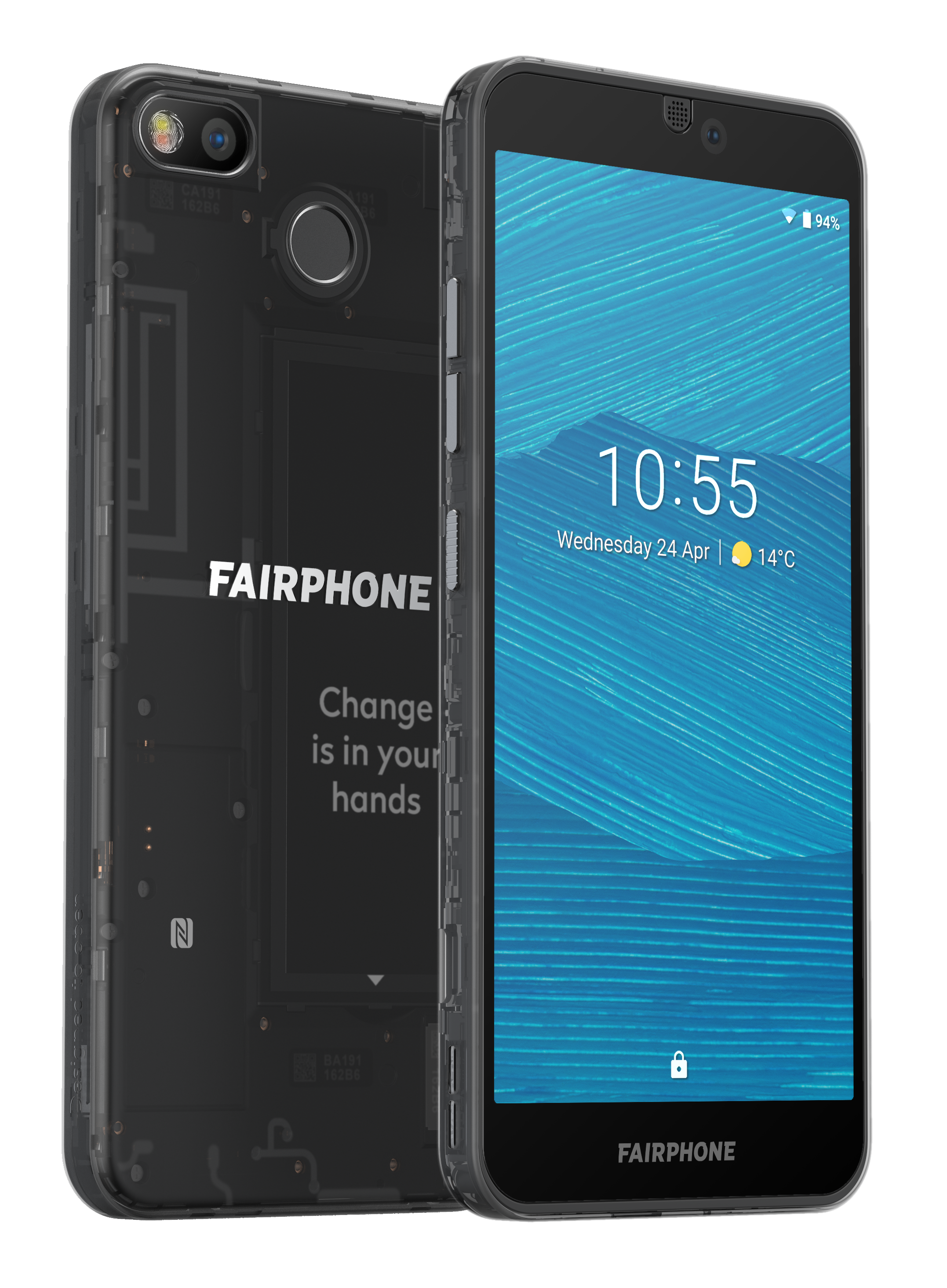
- Brand: Fairphone
- Type: Smartphone
- First released: 3 September 2019; 7 years ago
- Units sold: 203,653
- Predecessor: Fairphone 2
- Successor: Fairphone 4
- Form factor: Slate
- Dimensions: 158 mm (6.2 in) H 71.8 mm (2.83 in) W 9.89 mm (0.389 in) D
- Weight: 189 g (6.7 oz)
- Operating system: Original: Android 9 "Pie" (Fairphone 3) / Android 10 (Fairphone 3+); Upgradable: Android 11 "Red Velvet Cake" / Android 13 "Tiramisu"; Other: LineageOS (upgradable to Android 15) / /e/OS / Ubuntu Touch 16.04 xenial
- System-on-chip: Qualcomm Snapdragon 632
- CPU: 4 + 4 cores (1.8 GHz Kryo 250 Gold + 1.8 GHz Kryo 250 Silver)
- GPU: Qualcomm Adreno 506
- Memory: 4 GB RAM
- Storage: 64 GB
- Removable storage: microSD
- Battery: 3060 / 3000mAh Li-ion
- Rear camera: FP3: 12 MP ƒ/1.8 Sony IMX363 Exmor CMOS sensor with dual-LED flash FP3+: 48 MP (12 MP effective output) ƒ/1.79 Samsung ISOCELL GM1 CMOS sensor (Fairphone 3+) with dual-tone LED flash
- Front camera: 8 MP (ƒ/2) (Fairphone 3) / 16 MP (ƒ/2) (Fairphone 3+)
- Display: 5.65 in (144 mm) diagonal IPS LCD 1080×2160 px FullHD+ 427 ppi
- Connectivity: 2G (GSM/GPRS/EDGE): 850/900/1,800/1,900 MHz; 3G (HSPA+): 800/850/900/1700/1900/2100 MHz; LTE; Wi-Fi: 2.4/5.0 GHz, 802.11a/b/g/n/ac Bluetooth: 5.0 LE; Wi-Fi Hotspot; USB-C with support for USB OTG
- SAR: Head: FP3: 0.388 W/kg; FP3+ 0.411 W/kg; Body: FP3 & FP3+: 1.405 W/kg; Limb: FP3 & FP3+: 2.537 W/kg
- Other: Accelerometer, gyrometer, digital compass, proximity sensor, ambient light sensor, dual SIM
- Website: www.fairphone.com
- References: Specification of FP3

The Fairphone 3 and 3+ are touchscreen-based smartphones made by Fairphone. The phone has a modular, repairable design and is "constructed out of responsibly-sourced, conflict-free, and recycled materials where possible". It went on sale on 3 September 2019. It comes with Android 9 "Pie" installed.

The phone has a FullHD+ screen (2160 × 1080 pixels) with Gorilla Glass, 12 MP rear camera, 3,000 mAh battery, 64 GB storage with microSD, Qualcomm Snapdragon 632 processor, 4 GB RAM, 8 MP front camera (16 MP on Fairphone 3+), NFC and dual SIM. At launch the Fairphone 3 retailed at £408.

The Fairphone 3+, launched in August 2020, has upgraded front and rear cameras and speaker modules. The camera modules are compatible with the FP3. However, the improved audio primarily comes from the new core module in the FP3+ and is not upgradable as this is IMEI related.

The Fairphone 3+ shipped with Android 10 and an increase in the amount of recycled plastic it contains, now 40%.

Fairphone phased out the support of 3 and 3+ in August 2026. The company had therefore supported the devices for seven years, two years longer than it had originally promised. After August 2026, no further updates are released and the sale of spare parts by Fairphone stopped.

== Ethical manufacturing and sustainable materials ==
Fairphone 3 "has been manufactured in a factory that pays the local living wage". "The tin and tungsten used in its construction is conflict free, the gold is Fairtrade, and the copper and plastics are recycled."

== Modular design ==
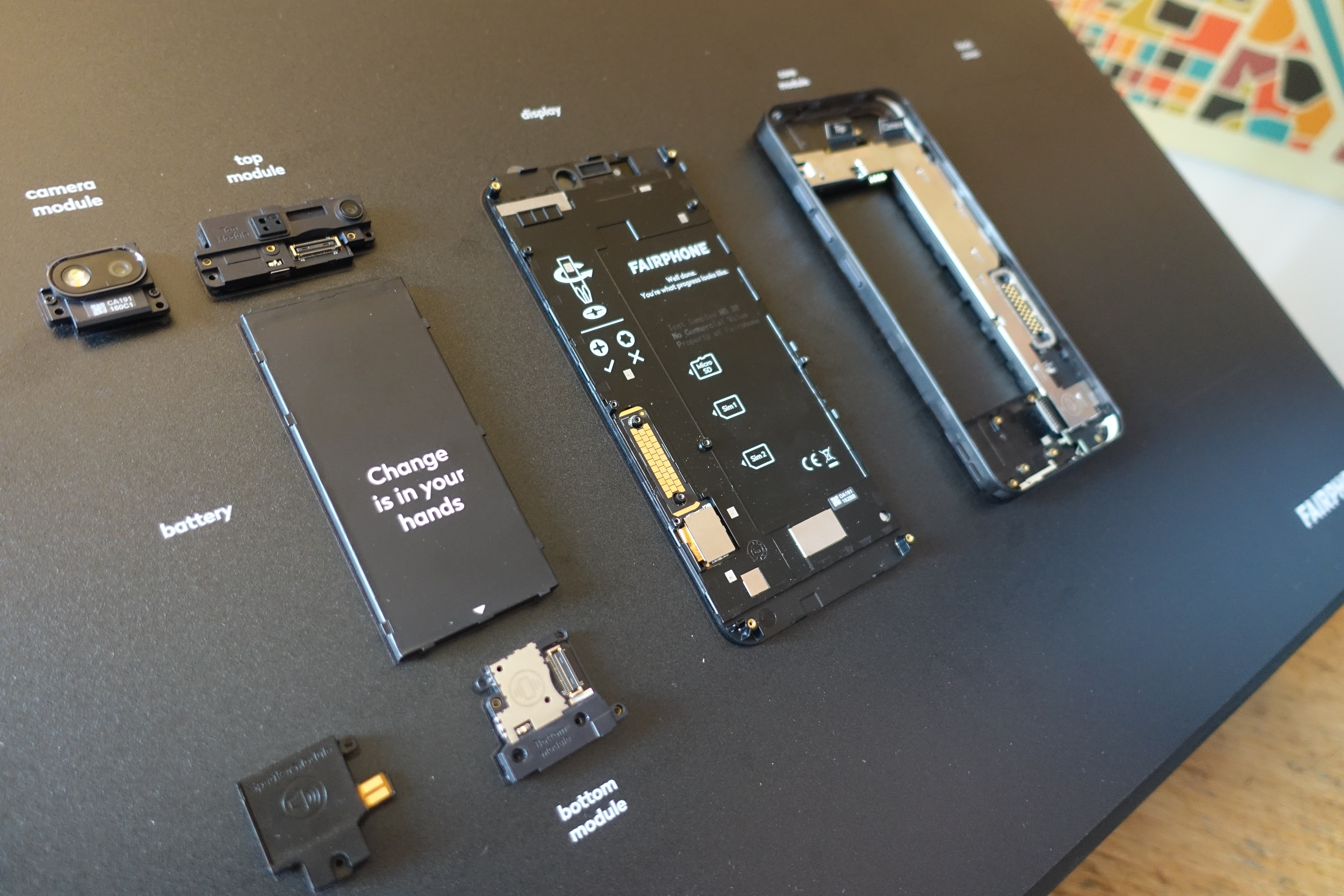
The individual modules in an opened Fairphone 3

The phone's modular design is constructed out of seven modules, making it easier to repair than most smartphones. The rear of the phone can be removed without using tools. Having removed the rear, the battery can be lifted out and replaced. Using a regular Phillips #00 screwdriver, the display is easily removed, and the modules are held in using only press fit sockets. The motherboard, containing the system on a chip, RAM and storage, can also be easily removed. Still, the motherboard's individual components can not be easily replaced.

== Reception ==
Sophie Charara, writing in Wired, said that the phone's technical specification is "almost identical to the Moto G7, our current recommendation for the best budget phone." She considered it "important" that "the premium for choosing an ethical phone had dropped to below £200" "for the first time".

iFixit gave it a 10 out of 10 repairability score; 10 is easiest to repair.

== Fairphone 3+ ==
The Fairphone 3+ was launched in August 2020. It has upgraded front and rear cameras, improved audio, an increase in the amount of recycled plastic it contains (40% rather than 9%) and Android 10. The rear camera has a larger sensor, intelligent scene detection, and a higher dynamic range. The front camera has a bigger sensor and a higher dynamic range. The new cameras and speaker are alternatively available as modules that can be swapped in the original Fairphone 3.

The audio improvements cannot be achieved purely by a speaker module upgrade. The speaker module is only for the rear/side speaker, and output is only improved if the new core module for the FP3+ is used.

== See also ==
- Phonebloks
- Right to repair
