= Fairphone 4 =

Fourth phone model of the company Fairphone

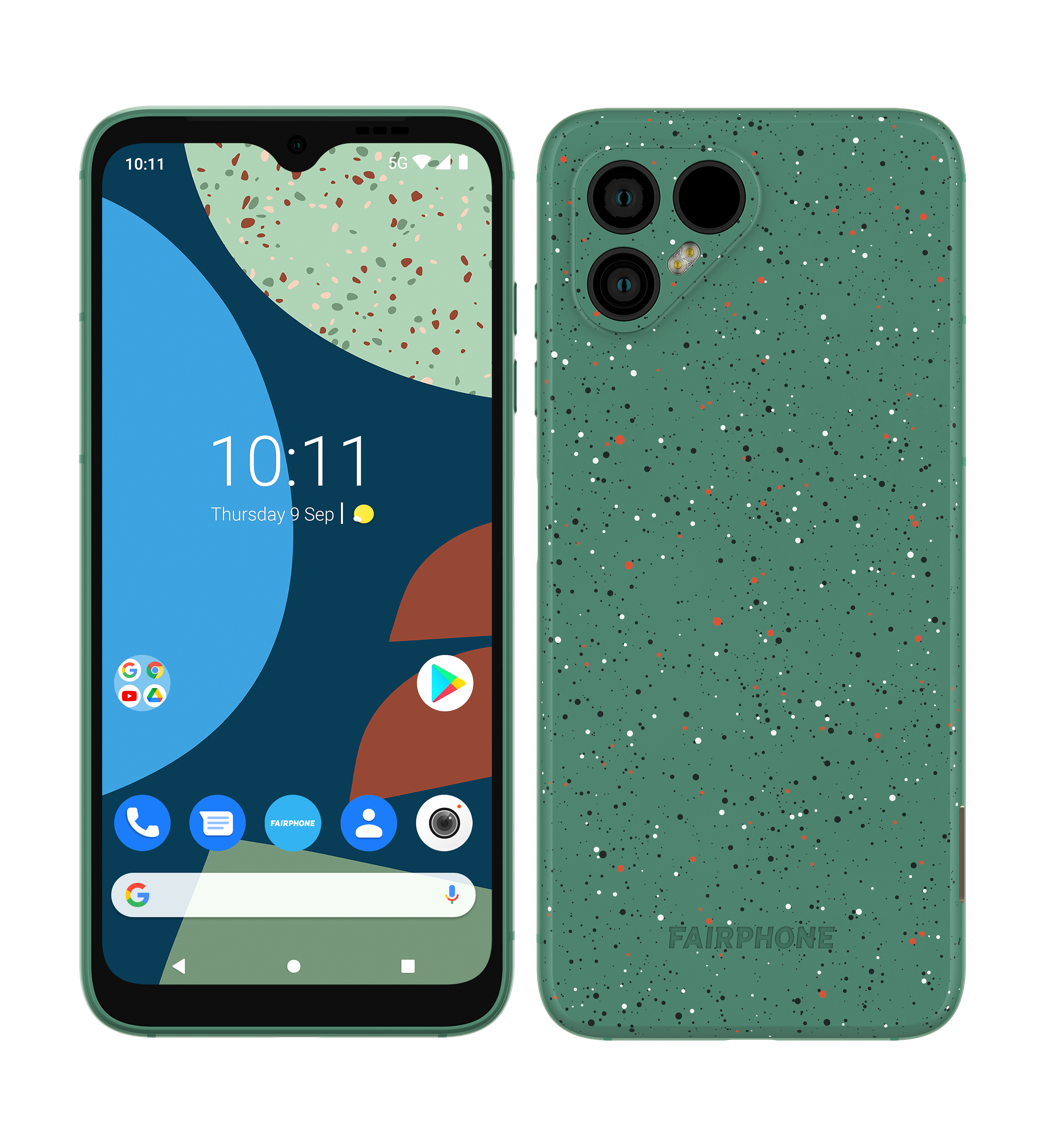
- Fairphone 4
- Brand: Fairphone
- First released: 25 October 2021; 5 years ago
- Discontinued: December 2024
- Units sold: 192,056
- Predecessor: Fairphone 3+
- Successor: Fairphone 5
- Form factor: Slate
- Dimensions: 162 mm × 75.5 mm × 10.5 mm (6.38 in × 2.97 in × 0.41 in)
- Weight: 225 g (7.9 oz)
- Operating system: Original: Android 11; Upgradable: Android 15
- System-on-chip: Qualcomm Snapdragon 750G
- Memory: 6 or 8 GB
- Storage: 128 or 256 GB
- Removable storage: Micro SD up to 2 TB
- SIM: Nano SIM and eSIM
- Battery: Li-Ion 3905 mAh, 20 W fast charging
- Rear camera: 3 modules. 48 MP, f/1.6, (wide), 1/2.0", 0.8μm, PDAF, OIS, 48 MP, f/2.2, (ultrawide), 1/2.0", 0.8μm, PDAF, TOF 3D, (depth)
- Front camera: 25 MP, f/2.2, (wide), 1/2.78", 0.9μm
- Display: IPS LCD 6.3" display with 1080 x 2340 pixels, 19.5:9 ratio (~409 ppi density)
- Connectivity: USB-C 3.0 (DisplayPort, USB-OTG); Miracast
- Data inputs: Dual band GNSS (GPS/GLONASS/BeiDou/Galileo)

Fairphone 4 is a smartphone designed and marketed by Fairphone. It succeeds the Fairphone 3+ and was succeeded by the Fairphone 5. It was announced on 30 September 2021, and was available for order from 25 October 2021 to December 2024.

Major upgrades from the predecessor include a larger display, better camera with optical image stabilization, improved selfie camera, 5G support, IP54 dust and splash protection and MIL810G certification, USB-C port, bigger battery, 20W fast charging among other changes.

It launched with Android 11 “Red Velvet Cake” and promised two major Android updates (Android 12 “Snow Cone” and Android 13 “Tiramisu”) and up to 5 years of warranty.

== Materials ==
The Fairphone 4 is made with Fairtrade-certified gold, aluminum from Aluminium Stewardship Initiative (ASI) Performance Standard certified vendors, fair tungsten from Rwanda, recycled tin, rare earth minerals, and plastics.

== Modular design ==
The phone's modular design is constructed of seven modules, making it easier to repair than most smartphones. The rear of the phone can be removed without using tools. Having removed the rear, the battery can be lifted out and replaced. The display is easily removed using a regular Phillips #00 screwdriver, as well as the different modules.

== Operating systems ==
Fairphone 4 originally launched with Android 11. As of October 2025 it now supports Android 15. Fairphone has pledged software support until at least 2028.

Fairphone 4 is supported by LineageOS 23.2 (Android 16), CalyxOS 6.5.21 (Android 15), and /e/ (Android 14/15). It also officially supports Ubuntu Touch.

Fairphone 4 also has community support for Sailfish OS 5, including VoLTE calls. This means Sailfish apps can run, but no Android app compatibility.

== Reception ==
The Fairphone 4 received mostly positive reviews praising its guarantee of software support until 2025 and up to 5 years of warranty and improvements over its predecessor. However, the lack of a headphone jack was criticized, along with the occasional sluggish performance and the quality of the camera and fingerprint sensor.

GrapheneOS criticized Fairphone 4 for being shipped with publicly available private keys for the firmware and stock operating system, causing security features such as verified boot and hardware keystore to break, and for not providing firmware updates on time.

== End of sale ==
Fairphone stopped producing and selling the Fairphone 4 in December 2024, but indicated the publication of software updates will continue after this date, and the production and sale of spare parts will continue until at least 2028.

== See also ==
- Modular phone
