= IODE =

IODE may refer to:

- Imperial Order Daughters of the Empire, a Canadian women's organization
- International Oceanographic Data and Information Exchange, a worldwide network that operates under the auspices of the Intergovernmental Oceanographic Commission

== See also ==
- iodéOS, an Android operating system
