= Bas van Abel =

Dutch engineer (born 1977)

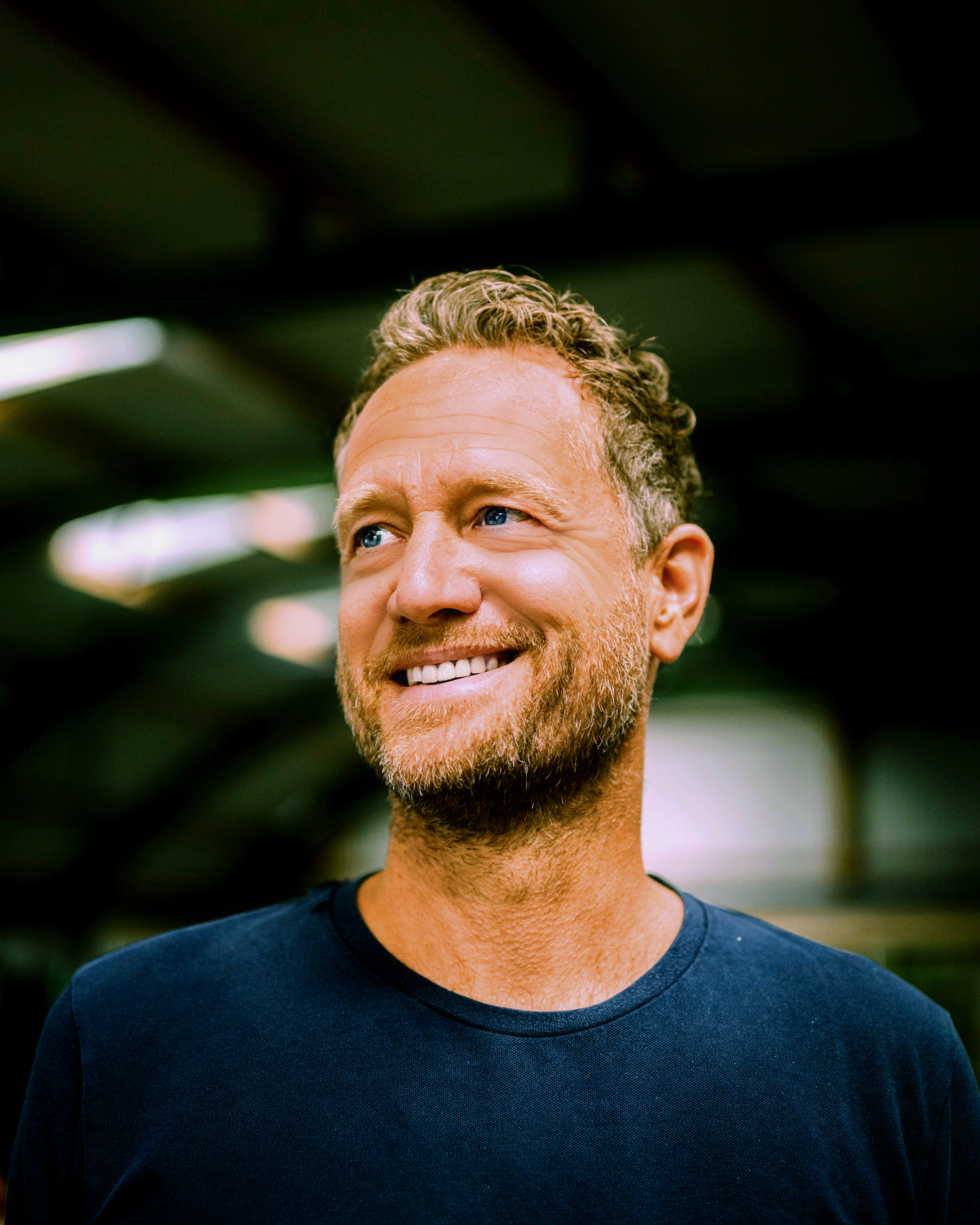
- Born: August 18, 1977 (age 49); Nijmegen, Netherlands
- Occupations: Social entrepreneur, designer, electrical engineer
- Known for: Founding Fairphone
- Notable work: Open Design Now: Why Design Cannot Remain Exclusive

Bas van Abel (born August 18, 1977, in Nijmegen, Netherlands) is a Dutch designer, electrical engineer, and social entrepreneur. He is best known as the founder of Fairphone, a social enterprise dedicated to creating sustainable and ethically produced smartphones.

== Early life and education ==
Abel studied Interaction Design at the Utrecht School of the Arts and pursued a parallel degree in Electrical Engineering and Programming at Delft University of Technology. His multidisciplinary education provided him with the skills to merge technology, design, and social impact.

== Career ==
Abel began his career at the Waag Society in Amsterdam, a nonprofit organization focused on the intersection of art, technology, and electronic media. His work there emphasized sustainability and fair trade in consumer electronics, which eventually inspired the creation of Fairphone.

In 2013, Abel founded Fairphone, a company that produces modular smartphones designed for longevity, repairability, and ethical sourcing of materials. Fairphone addresses issues such as conflict minerals, labor conditions, and electronic waste. Under his leadership, the company gained recognition for its innovative approach to sustainable technology and became a certified B Corporation.

Abel stepped down as CEO of Fairphone in 2018 to focus on the company's strategic direction as a member of its supervisory board. His successor, Eva Gouwens, continued to build on his vision for ethical electronics.

== Achievements and impact ==
Abel's work with Fairphone has had a profound impact on the electronics industry, challenging traditional practices and promoting transparency, sustainability, and ethical consumption. The company's modular design philosophy has influenced the broader conversation around the right to repair and the environmental impact of consumer electronics.

Abel has received numerous awards for his contributions, including:

- The Momentum for Change Award from the United Nations Framework Convention on Climate Change (UNFCCC) in 2015.
- The German Environmental Prize in 2016.
- Schwab Foundation's Social Entrepreneur of the Year Award 2018 for his contributions to ethical and sustainable technology.
- The Global Economy Prize in 2018 from the Kiel Institute for the World Economy.

== Publications ==
Abel has contributed to the discourse on open design and sustainability through his publications. Notable works include:

- Open Design Now: Why Design Cannot Remain Exclusive (2011), co-authored with Lucas Evers, Roel Klaassen, and edited by Peter Troxler. This book explores the democratization of design and its potential for social impact.
- Contributions to academic and industry discussions on sustainable technology, including case studies such as Fairphone: Organising for Sustained Social Impact.

== See also ==
- Fairphone
