= Shift6m =

2018 Android smartphone model

SHIFT6m
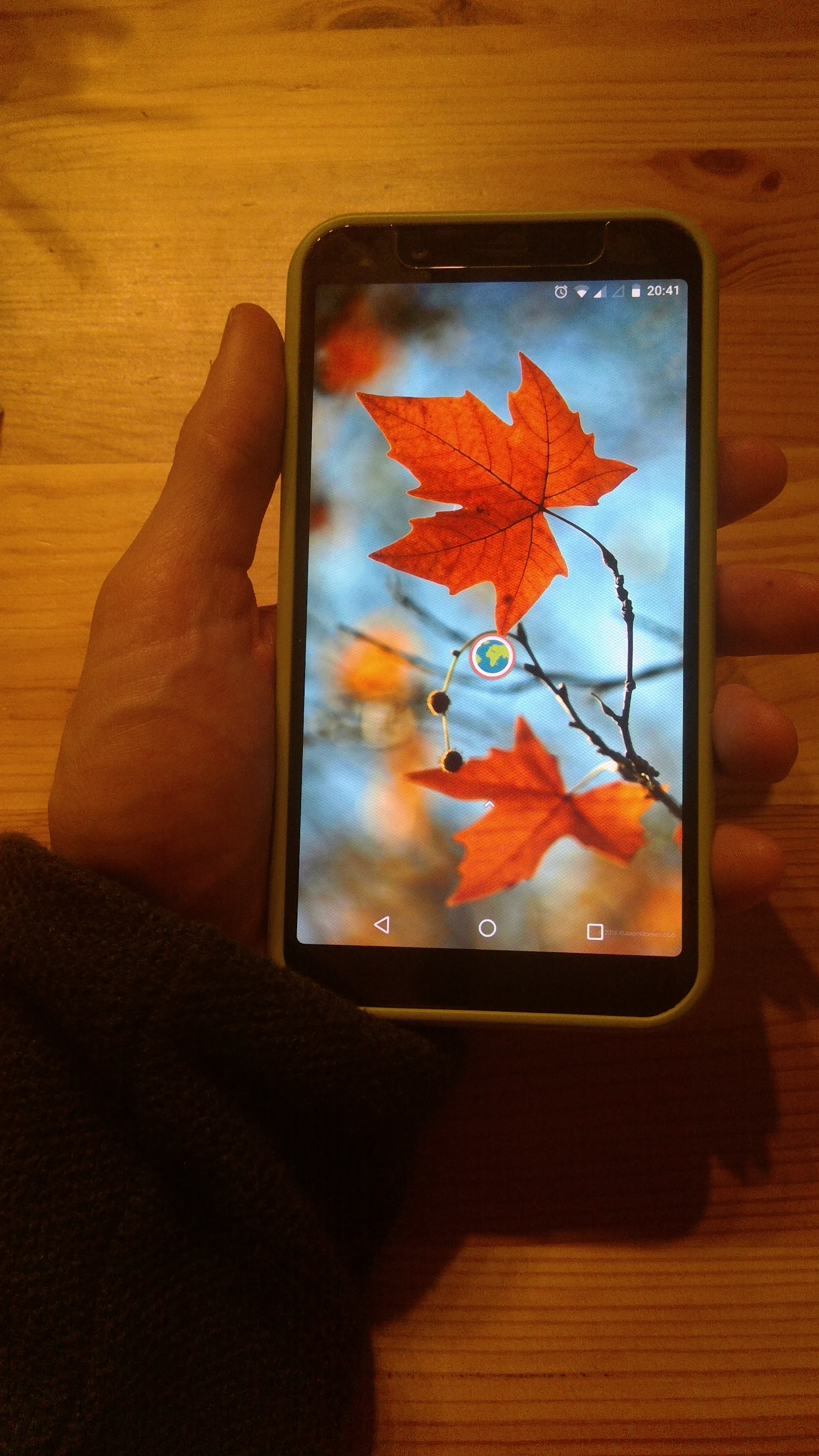
- Brand: SHIFT
- Type: Smartphone
- First released: 2018; 8 years ago
- Form factor: Slate
- Dimensions: 151.5 mm (5.96 in) H 79.8 mm (3.14 in) W 10.0 mm (0.39 in) D
- Weight: 189 g (6.7 oz)
- Operating system: Android 8 "Oreo"
- CPU: MT6797X Helio X27 ( 2* Cortex-A72 + 4*Cortex-A53 + 4*Cortex-A53 )
- Memory: 4 GB RAM
- Storage: 64 GB
- Removable storage: microSDXC
- Battery: 4240 mAh Li-ion
- Rear camera: 21 MP
- Front camera: 8 MP
- Display: 5.7 in (140 mm) diagonal AMOLED 1080×1920 px FullHD ... ppi
- Other: accelerometer, gyrometer, digital compass, proximity sensor, ambient light sensor, dual SIM
- Website: www.shiftphones.com/en/

The Shift6m is a modular smartphone produced by the Shift GmbH from Falkenberg, Hessen, Germany. It was released in May 2018.

== Hardware ==
=== Core ===
The phone measures 79.8 mm × 151.5 mm × 10.0 mm.

The processor is a MT6797X Helio X27, 2,6 GHz, 10 core by MediaTek, introduced on 2 July 2018. It contains three clusters, two ARM Cortex-A72, four ARM Cortex-A53 with up to 2 GHz and further four ARM Cortex-A53.

The display measures 5,7-inch in the diagonal and is Full HD display (1080x1920) using AMOLED-technology and is protected by Gorilla Glass 5. There are two cameras: 21 MP back, 8-MP front, 4K video is supported. The battery has a capacity for 4240 mAh. The RAM is 4 GB DDR. The internal storage is 64 GB. There is a receptacle for microSDXC cards to add storage of up to 256 GB. Further receptacle is for USB-C supporting USB 3.1 another for 3.5 mm audio plugs. Two slots for nano-SIM cards exist. The model supports 4G LTE, NFC and features a fingerprint sensor.

==== Modules ====
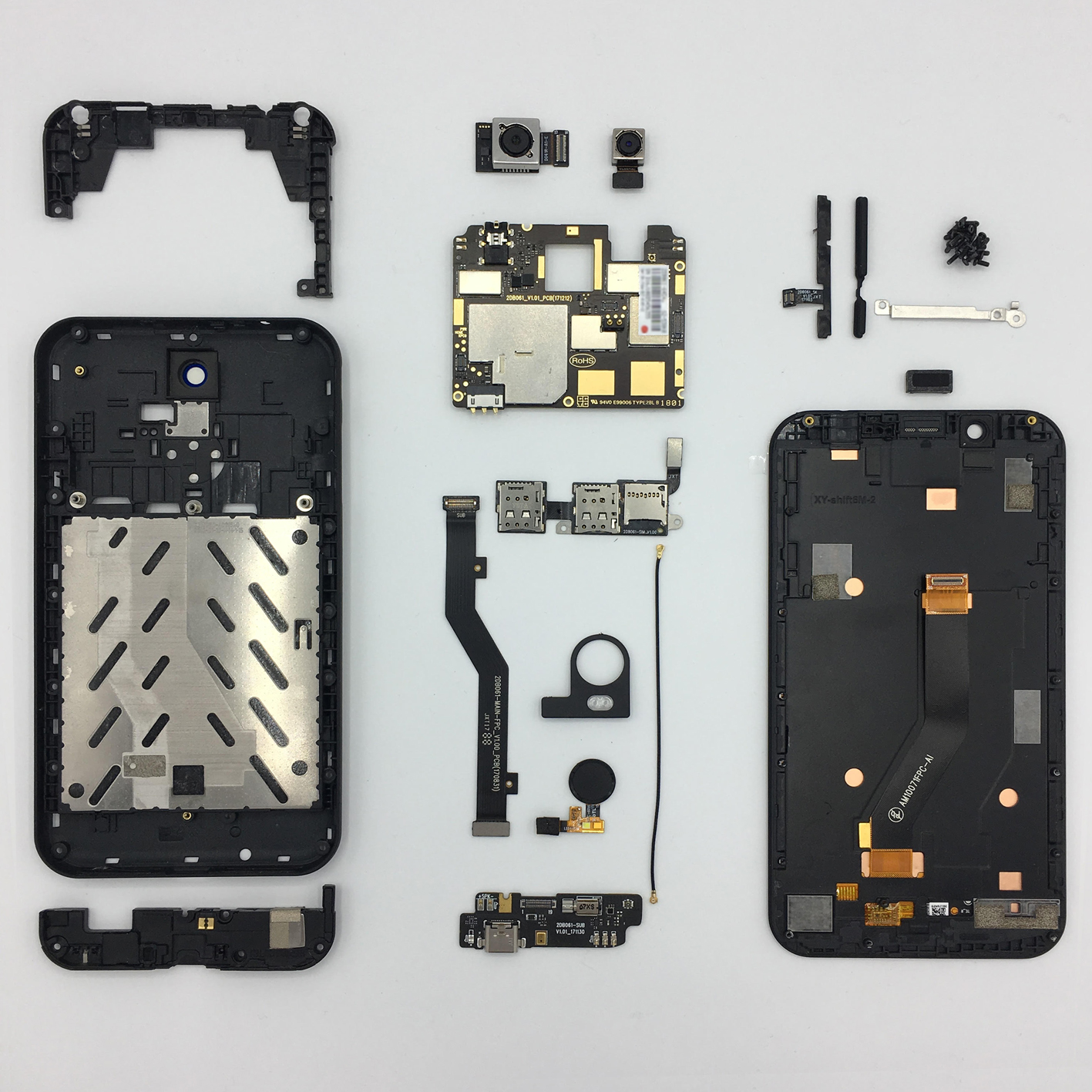
Modular parts of the SHIFT6m

The phone consists of 13 modules.

==== Connection between the modules ====
The modules are connected by plugging or with screws. The screws are only of one type, torx 3 of the same length.

=== Additional parts ===
A Torx 3 screw driver is included.

== Software ==
At time of release it came with Android 8 Oreo.

== Reception ==
=== Awards received ===
In 2018 it was awarded the highest national ward for ecological design in Germany, the Bundespreis Ecodesign, in the category "product".

=== Reports ===
golem.de reported in detail on the company and its efforts in terms of sustainability and fairness in June 2018.

The ProSieben magazine Galileo tested the newly published smartphone Shift6m and illuminates, in the form of video recordings, the production conditions of the in-house manufactory located in China in June 2018.

N-tv describes the initial efforts for fairness and sustainability as well as the history of the Shiftphone, in September 2018.

In August 2018 the ecology portal Utopia.de reviews the product and lists it in its "Bestenliste faire Smartphones".

In 2019 iFixit gave it 9/10 score for repairability.
