= Fairphone 6 =

2025 smartphone

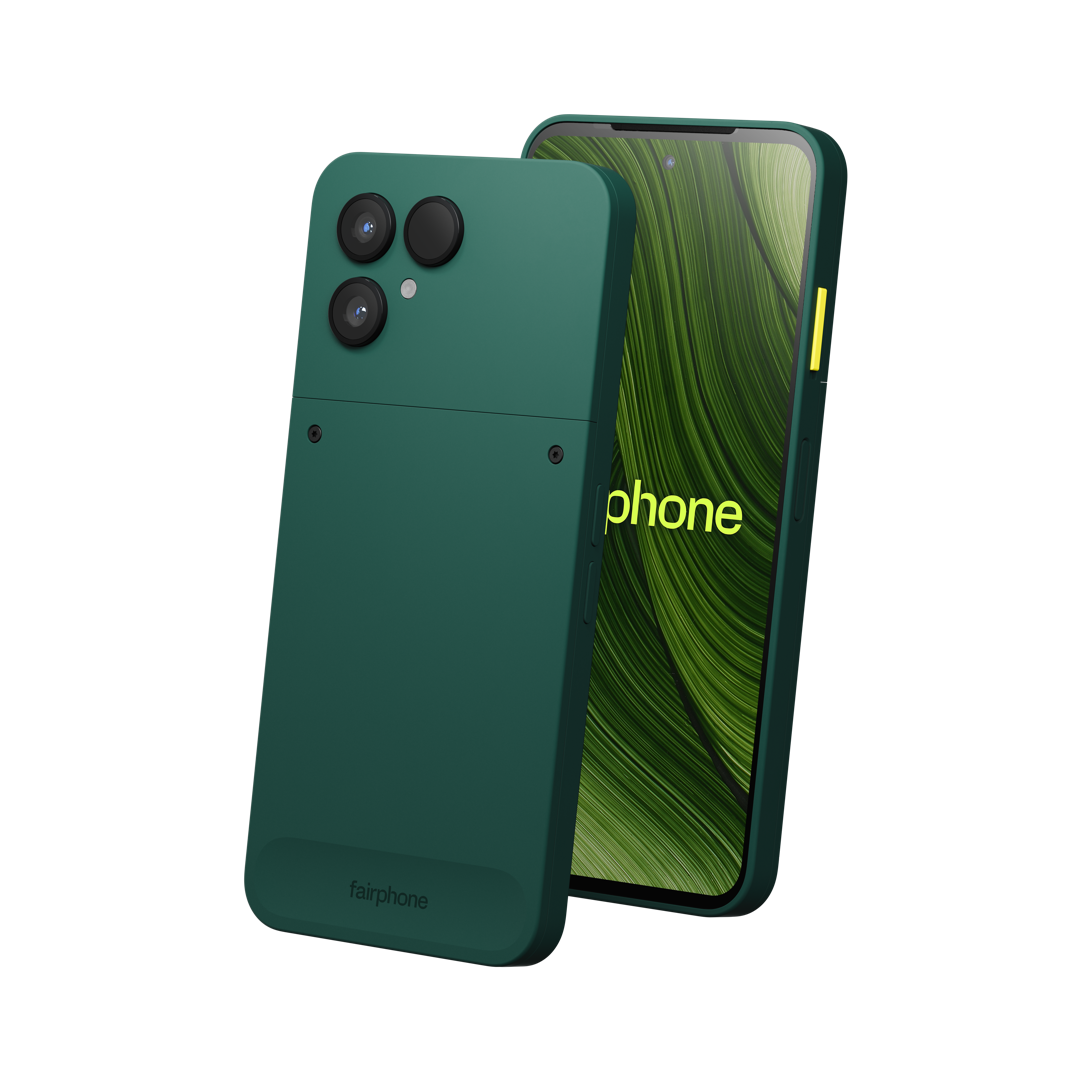
- Also known as: Fairphone (Gen. 6)
- Developer: Fairphone
- First released: Fairphone 6: 25 June 2025; 16 months ago Fairphone 6+: 18 August 2026; 2 months ago
- Predecessor: Fairphone 5
- Dimensions: 156.5 mm × 73.3 mm × 9.6 mm (6.16 in × 2.89 in × 0.38 in)
- Weight: 193 g (6.8 oz)
- Operating system: Fairphone 6: Android 15; Fairphone 6+: Android 16
- System-on-chip: Fairphone 6: Qualcomm Snapdragon 7s Gen 3 Fairphone 6+: Qualcomm Snapdragon 7s Gen 4
- GPU: Adreno 810
- Memory: Fairphone 6: 8 GB; Fairphone 6+: 12 GB
- Storage: 256 GB
- Removable storage: MicroSD up to 2 TB
- SIM: Nano SIM and eSIM
- Battery: Li-Ion 4415 mAh
- Charging: 30 W fast charging
- Display: 120 Hz 6.31" OLED FHD+ display with 1116 x 2484 pixels, 20:9 ratio (~431 ppi density)
- Connectivity: Wi-Fi 6E; Bluetooth 5.4; NFC; USB-C 2.0
- Water resistance: IP55
- Website: Fairphone Gen 6 Fairphone Gen 6+

Fairphone 6 is a smartphone designed and marketed by Fairphone, following its Fairphone 5. It was announced as "The Fairphone (Gen. 6)" on 25 June 2025. The phone was originally only available in Europe for €599, however in October 2025 it was officially made available in the US for $899 through /e/OS creator Murena. The phone comes with 5 years of warranty and 8 years of updates.

== Specifications ==
Fairphone 6 is a modular smartphone, making it easily repairable and customisable by the user. It supports 5G and Wi-Fi 6E connectivity, and has a 4,415 mAh user-replaceable battery. The phone is sold with 256 GB of storage and 8 GB RAM. It has a 50 MP camera with optical image stabilisation and a 13 MP ultra-wide lens, and an IP55 rating. There are black, green, and white colour options.

The phone ships with Android 15, with e/OS being available when the phone is purchased through the company website. Users can also switch to other operating systems.

== Fairphone 6+ ==
On 18 August 2026, a refreshed variant known as the Fairphone 6+ was released, marketed as the "The Fairphone (Gen. 6+)". It ships with Android 16; other changes include a new processor (Snapdragon 7s Gen 4 from the 7s Gen 3), a boost in RAM capacity to 12 GB from 8 GB, and a new "Cobalt Blue" color option. This is the first Fairphone officially available in the United States.
