= Südwind Association =

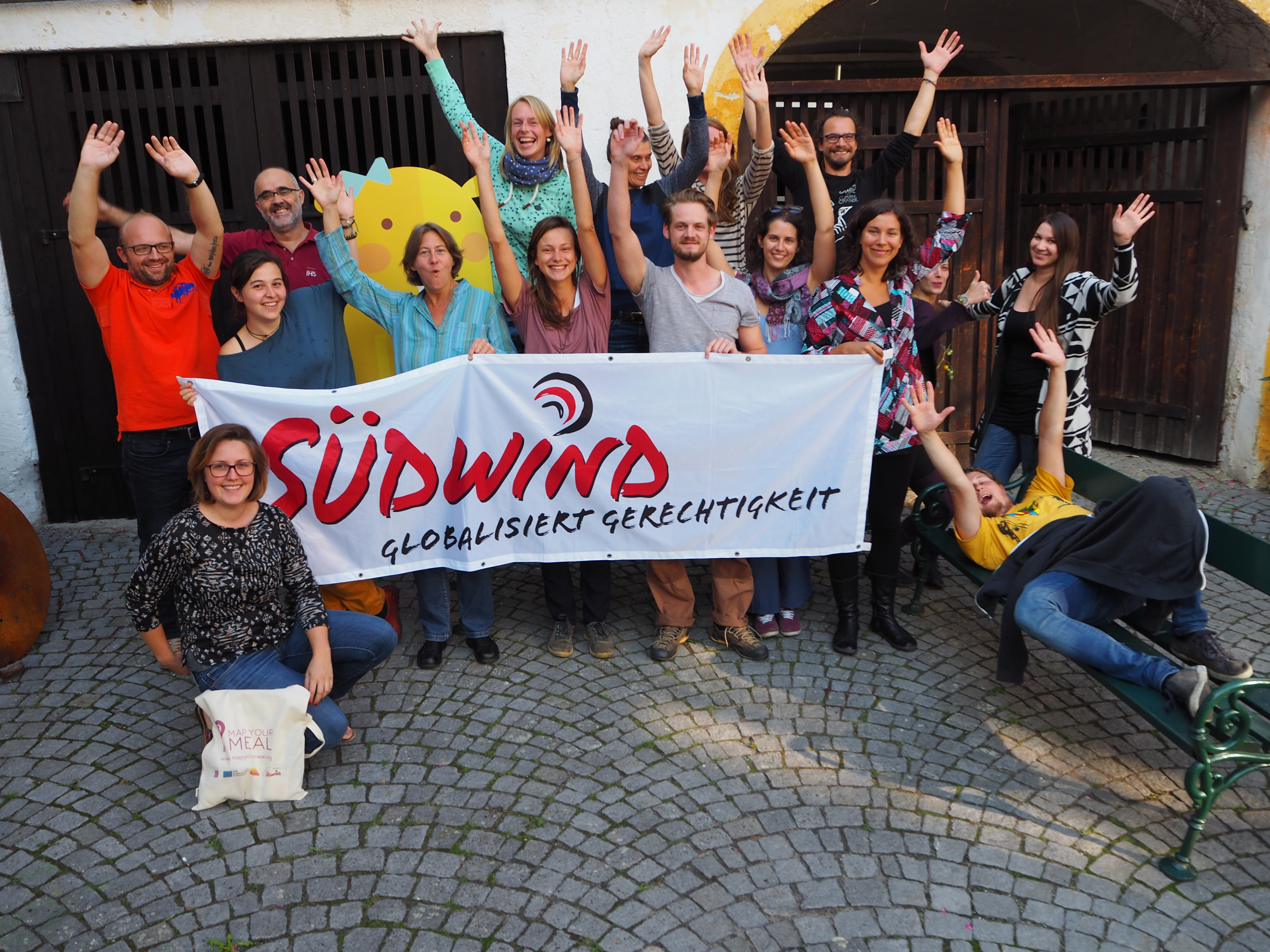
Südwind Activists

The Südwind Association is an Austrian non-profit NGO focusing on education and campaign work in the international development field. The organisation has been active since 1997.

== History ==
In 1979, the association Austrian Information Service for International Development Policy (Österreichischer Informationsdienst für Entwicklungspolitik; ÖIE) was founded with the conviction to promote the idea of development policy in Austria. Church organizations, the Austrian Students' Association, the Europahaus Eisenstadt, youth organizations (SJ & JVP) and an array of development policy focused research groups united to tackle this endeavour. Toward the end of the 1990s the ÖIE was renamed to “Südwind Entwicklungspolitik” and the “Südwind Agency” was founded as non-profit ltd. The non-profit ltd. was dissolved in 2015, from that point on Südwind has been legally registered as an association. Südwind's main objective is to reduce the socioeconomic imbalance between Global North and Global South. Their approach is to offer information and education in Austria, to raise awareness for global issues.

Providing and producing workshops for schools, teaching material that focuses on Global Learning and Global Citizenship Education and interactive exhibitions, has been at the core of Südwind's efforts for over 35 years. Organizing campaigns for a more just world, for example “Jute statt Plastik” (1979; aimed at making people replace plastic bags with jute bags), “Hunger ist kein Schicksal” (1980; hunger is not a destiny), “Stimmen für den Regenwald” (1992; voices for the rainforest) and the “Clean Clothes Campaign” (since 2001) are an essential part of Südwind's activity.

== Organizational structure ==
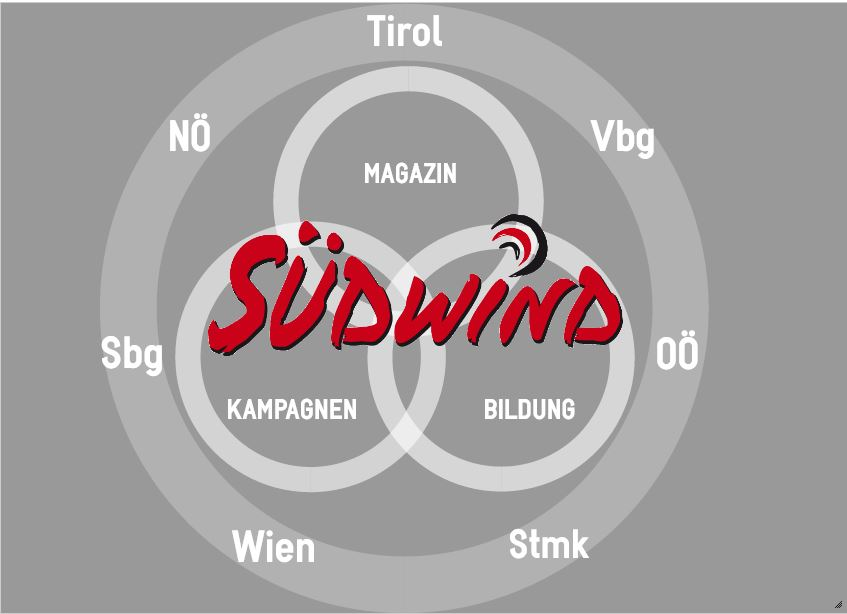
Südwind's structure

The Südwind association is the founder of Klimabündnis and a stakeholder of Südwind-Buchwelt and the publisher of Südwind-Magazine. The association coordinates many of its projects in cooperation with various international partner organizations.

Südwind is represented on the board of the AG Globale Verantwortung, the network Soziale Verantortung (NESOVE) and WearFair +mehr. It is also member of the WIDE-Network and is engaged in the platforms ECA-Watch Austria, Oikocredit, the information agency for journalists & development policy (ISJE), “Wir haben es satt!” and Baobab. Südwind has also acted as coordination body for the Clean Clothes Campaign in Austria.

On a regional level Südwind acts through regional associations located in Styria, Vienna, Lower Austria, Upper Austria, Salzburg, Tirol and Vorarlberg, of which six host a so-called Infothek. Infotheks supply the public with teaching materials, nonfiction, videos/DVDs, slide series, games, children's and youth literature etc. that revolve around the topic of international development policy.

Südwind's activities are mainly financed by projects. Projects are mostly funded by the Austrian Development Agency (ADA), the Austrian ministry of education, the ministry of labour, social affairs and consumer protection as well as the European Union. Additionally, donations enable part of Südwind's work. Municipalities and federal provinces financially support some activities on a regional level.

== Consultative Status in the United Nations Organization ==
Since 2009, Südwind has been holding a consultative status in the Economic- and Social Council of the United Nations (ECOSOC). The status allows Südwind to organize parallel events, take part in UN conferences in Vienna, Geneva and New York City, and to utter statements and written inputs. Here, Südwind's main focus lies on partaking in the United Nations Human Rights Council's (UNHRC) meetings in Geneva.

== Südwind-Magazin ==
The Südwind-Magazin has been reporting on topics like international politics, culture and international development policy for over 35 years. The editors are independent. The magazine aims to report on issues and regions that are underrepresented by the media. The editorial charter determines the magazine's mission to inform the public about social, political, economic and cultural realities in so called third-world countries, about development policies and international cooperation, aiming to bridge the gap between north and south. The current representatives of the publisher are Martin Jäggle, Brigitte Pilz and Erhard Stackl. The Südwind-Magazin defines itself as an undogmatic information and discussion resource for people who strive for more justice between the Global North and the Global South and want to acquire more knowledge about international topics.

The magazine appears 10 times annually and has 52 pages. It contains reports, comic-strips, analyses and interviews about topics surrounding the Global South and propositions for change in the Global North.

== Südwind-Buchwelt ==
In 1984, the first bookstore that focused on development policy was founded in Vienna and named Südwind. The second part of the name is taken from the bookstore “Buchwelt” that merged with the Südwind bookstore a couple of years later.

Today a large repertoire of respective literature, world music CDs and fairtrade handicraft and foods are sold in shops in the 9th and in the 7th district of Vienna and online. The founding idea of Südwind-Buchwelt was to offer better access to literature relevant to developmental policy. The bookstore is constantly engaged in synthesizing respective literature for common use, and aspires to improve industrial regions’ understanding of societal, ecological and economic processes in the Global South. Südwind-Buchwelt's work supplies an important fundament for numerous libraries, schools and other educational facilities by offering them useful guidelines for their choice in educational material.

Südwind-Buchwelt operates independently from the Südwind association; the association is merely a stakeholder of Südwind-Buchwelt.

== Activism ==
Südwind-Activists’ main objective is to mobilize and raise awareness for global justice. They focus on topics that are relevant to Südwind, but the activists also independently select global and societal issues they deem important. Their members take part in public discourse, organize events and public happenings to inform society about current developments, hold discussions about current topics and campaigns, and organize meetings throughout Austria, like for example the Südwind-Academy.

== External links and sources ==
- Verein Südwind Entwicklungspolitik (Südwind Association; German)
- Südwind Magazin Homepage (German)
- Südwind Buchwelt Homepage (German)
- Südwind Activists Homepage (German)
- Südwind Donations (German)
