= /e/ (operating system) =

Free and open-source mobile operating system based on LineageOS

- Developer: Gaël Duval, /e/ Foundation
- OS family: Android (Linux)
- Latest release: 4.5.1 / 19 November 2026; 2 days ago
- Repository: gitlab.e.foundation
- Available in: Multilingual
- Package manager: APK-based "App Lounge"
- Supported platforms: ARM, ARM64
- Kernel type: Monolithic (Linux)
- License: Apache 2, MIT and other licenses
- Official website: https://e.foundation/e-os/

/e/ (also known as /e/ OS and /e/OS, formerly Eelo) is a fork of LineageOS, an Android-based mobile operating system, and associated online services. /e/ is presented as privacy software that does not contain proprietary Google apps or services, and challenges the public to "find any parts of the system or default applications that are still leaking data to Google".

== Software ==
/e/ is a fork of LineageOS, which is itself a fork of the CyanogenMod and Android operating systems. /e/ uses MicroG, "an open source project that hijacks Google API calls" according to Ron Amadeo of Ars Technica, as an alternative for Google Play Services and geolocation.

Some /e/ applications and sources are proprietary. /e/ includes a closed-source maps app, Magic Earth. A privacy app was proprietary when first developed, then open source after release.

As of August 2026 builds based on Android versions up to 16 were available.

== History ==
In 2017, Mandrake Linux creator Gaël Duval proposed the concept of an operating system without privacy-invasive software as a "non-profit project 'in the public interest'". Duval wrote, "Apple, Google, Facebook etc., business models are harmful for our economical and social environments". The operating system was initially called Eelo; the name was inspired by moray eels, which Duval saw as "fish that can hide in the sea". Duval launched a Kickstarter crowdfunding campaign with an initial goal of €25,000, and received at least €71,000 from contributors.

Eelo was renamed to /e/ in July 2018 due to a conflict with the "eelloo" trademark, which was owned by a human resources company. In a March 2020 interview, Duval stated the /e/ name would be abandoned "for something else quite soon".

Beta versions of /e/ were released for 20 to 30 smartphone models in September 2018. As of February 2026 /e/ supported 271 smartphone models. As of April 2020, Murena was teaming with Fairphone to sell Fairphones with /e/OS pre-installed.

=== Corporations and organizations ===
ECORP SAS, a privately held corporation founded in 2018 with Gaël Duval President and Alexis Noetinger General Director, operates the online store selling phones with /e/ operating system pre-installed, and the included online services.

ESolutions SAS, a privately held corporation, was formed in January 2020 with Ecorp SAS listed as President and Alexis Noetinger as General Director. ESolutions operates the online store for sales of phones and cloud storage subscriptions.

=== Murena phones ===
In May 2022, Liam Proven writing for The Register reported that Murena "privacy-centric" phones would be sold by Murena company with /e/ included. The Murena company was established as a different entity for selling these phones, and ESolutions SAS was re-named Murena Retail. The Murena One, a budget hardware device running Android 10, was priced "noticeably more expensive than the rock-bottom budget end of the market". Proven also said /e/ OS feels "clunky in places", functionality was restricted compared with full Google Android, but it worked and was fast and stable. David Pierce of The Verge said App Lounge required accepting Terms of Service, and you download Play apps from Google in a "different-looking store". The connection to Google made "a lot of Murena's early testers mad" according to Pierce. Pierce concluded Murena and /e/OS showed "how ingrained Google is in our digital lives" and how much control Google has. Michael Allison of Digital Trends said at the time "Murena will all but certainly fail" and "A de-Googled smartphone can never hit mass appeal".

In November 2022, Ferdinand Thommes, after testing a pre-production Murena One, wrote for linux-community.de, "The range of basic applications on the Murena One covers the usual applications well" and has a "uniform look". Thommes said all included apps were open-source except Magic Earth navigation. Apart from short-term, unidentified problems with Wi-Fi, which were fixed after several reboots, and an NFC failure, "the software and hardware worked without any problems". Thommes stated /e/OS "is not hardened in any way", and recommended GrapheneOS or CalyxOS if you need a hardened smartphone. He also said the supplied version of /e/OS was "based on Android 10, which is no longer supported by Google". About the included MicroG, Thommes wrote "many communities like LineageOS are critical of it because it uses signature spoofing" which, if handled carelessly, can "increase the attack surface of your system". Thommes said the hardware was "solid-looking and well-held", from the "lower mid-range", with a four-year-old Mediatek Helio P60, describing it as "in the lower third of performance", with camera quality that is "acceptable at best." He said Murena One is aimed at people who do not want to leave their data to Google, and do not want to install and maintain an operating system. Thommes stated respect is due to Gaël Duval, who has been working on the operating system since 2017, and concluded "For German users, the Volla Phone 22 offers a possible alternative to the Murena One."

As of 2026 Murena continued to sell a range of updated phones, and a tablet computer.

== Reception ==
The Free Software Foundation declined to endorse /e/ because it "contains nonfree libraries". Ross Rubin of Fast Company described /e/'s strategy as a "Google-like approach" of maximizing user adoption, in contrast to hardware manufacturer and software developer Purism's "Apple-like approach" of vertical integration. Jack Wallen of TechRepublic believed that /e/ will "prove Android can exist without Google", but predicted that the operating system would not appeal to ordinary smartphone users. Sascha Segan of PC Magazine was "encouraged by /e/, and by its determination to create an easy-to-use (and, hopefully, easy to install) alternative," but was "queasy about the sources of third-party apps on /e/." He also defended /e/ against InfoSec Handbook's criticisms, which /e/ "took to heart and has been working on it in public bug threads anyone can read online."

In November 2020, Tim Anderson of The Register said installation of /e/ is "not for the fainthearted" but the operating system "feels lightweight and responsive" because of "fewer background services than on a typical Android device."

In a review in March 2021, Ron Amadeo of Ars Technica said, "Actually getting regular Android apps to run on a forked version of Android is a challenge", and "there's a good chance that functionality won't work on /e/ OS." He also described "/e/'s communication problems".

In August 2022 for TomsGuide.com, Jordan Palmer wrote about experimenting with installing /e/OS version 1 on an ASUS ZenFone 8, Pixel 4a, and Pixel 5, and summarized by saying, "I don't want to be mean, but I also can't sugarcoat it: the documentation and recovery aren't good experiences." Palmer was unable to get the "Easy Installer" for Pixel 4a to run on Fedora or Manjaro. Of the "iOS influence" and "Apple-like design", Palmer "had hoped for more originality" and criticized using the two years old Android 11 version. Palmer said "The system apps all seem to work OK, even on the Pixel 4a's hardware" but was baffled because the Google Fi app was preinstalled, and concluded "If I can get the ROM installed properly on the Zenfone 8 I have in my office, I might just give /e/OS another shot as my daily driver".

June 2025 Liam Proven of The Register wrote "Murena's /e/ OS is arguably the most mainstream de-Googled Android OS" while indicating the use of the phone was a bit like Desktop Linux in that some things either don't work or require more effort to set up. "But, just like Ubuntu, it looks pretty, it works, and it does the job."

== Releases ==
Version	LineageOS Version	Release date	Android Security patches	MicroG version	Significant changes
0.9		26 June 2020			
0.10		7 August 2020			
0.11		28 August 2020			
0.12		1 October 2020			
0.13		8 December 2020		0.2.14.204215	
0.14		27 January 2021			
0.15		15 March 2021			
0.16		15 April 2021			
0.17		10 June 2021			
TBD					
1.10	19.1	17 April 2023	2023-03-01	N/A	
1.11	19.1	15 May 2023	2023-04-01	N/A	Allows to import settings in Mail, fixes eDrive sync errors
1.12.3	19.1	20 June 2023	2023-05-01	0.2.28	Fix battery drain issue, upgrade of Teracube 2e (2020) to Android 11, turn off OEM unlocking during initial setup if bootloader is locked, fixes in AppLounge and Advanced Privacy
1.13	19.1	26 July 2023	2023-06-01	N/A	Many crash fixes. Improvements to Contacts, Safetynet is working again on FP3 and FP4
1.14	19.1	20 August 2023	2023-07-01	Updated	Add a screen reader based on Talkback-FOSS, Teracube 2e and Murena One moves to Android 12
1.15	20	18 September 2023	2023-08-01	0.2.28.233013-135	Calendar do not offer an about page, as it was causing calls to Google, Message allows to share pictures
1.16	20	24 October 2023	2023-09-01	N/A	Improvements to AppLounge
1.17	20	14 November 2023	2023-10-01	Updated	microG: Move to Stadia map tiler backend, SMS fixes, AppLounge improvements (F-Droid links are handled, warns when space is insufficient, search results are exhaustive...)
1.18	20	11 December 2023	2023-11-01	N/A	Improvements to Fairphone 5, Contact app no longer suggest to add a Google account to backup the contacts when no account is set
1.19.1	20	15 January 2024	2023-12-01	N/A	Advanced Privacy improvements: Apps with trackers can be filtered to find them more easily, a view by tracker is available, All contact properties are now exported into vCard
1.20	20	23 February 2024	2024-01-01	N/A	Compatibility with the Application Licensing API, Improvements on the Updater, Advanced Privacy is clearer about what it blocks, PDF Viewer Plus has been replaced by MJ PDF reader to provide more options and up to date security patches
1.21	20	27 March 2024	2024-02-01	N/A	Fairphone 3 upgraded to Android 13, dedicated section for /e/OS specific options in the Developer options, App Lounge allows to purchase an app from the Play Store using a Google account.
2.0	20	16 May 2024	2024-04-01	0.3.1.240913	Upgrade of the launcher. Support of Android Auto. Advanced Privacy has a Wall of Shame. App lounge allows to filter apps without tracker or Open Source (from F-Droid)
2.1	20	6 June 2024	2024-05-01	N/A	Fairphone 4 has been upgraded to Android 13. Introduction of their own backend location services to take over Mozilla Location Services ending
2.2	20	22 July 2024	2024-06-01	0.3.2.240913	Introduction of Parental Control
2.3	20	22 August 2024	2024-07-01	N/A	Fixes and security updates
2.4	20	27 September 2024	2024-09-01	N/A	Pixel 7 is officially supported.
2.5	20	12 November 2024	2024-10-01	N/A	Advanced Privacy is now able to make the real position available to some apps while fake location is on. UnifiedPush notifications are now supported.
2.6.3	21	17 December 2024	2024-11-01	N/A	Google apps are working again. Anonymous login in App Lounge is fixed. ~100 devices can be upgraded to Android 14
2.7	21	14 January 2025	2024-12-01	0.3.6.244735	Microsoft account is handled by the Mail app. Galaxy S20, S20+ and S20 Ultra are now supported.
2.8	21	27 February 2025	2025-01-01	N/A	
2.9	21	1 April 2025	2025-03-01	N/A	Mullvad DNS is used by default for Parental Control. Improvements to App Lounge.
3.0	21	3 June 2025	2025-05-01	N/A	Introduction of "Find my device", get the device location by sending an SMS to it. Introduction to Murena Voice to Text as a premium feature. Improvements to Parental Control. Teracube 2s is now officially supported.
3.0.1	21	6 June 2025	N/A	N/A	Fix crash of Advanced Privacy
3.0.2	22.2	30 June 2025	N/A	N/A	Accessibility improvements with inclusion of Live caption
3.0.4	22.2	11 July 2025	2025-06-01	N/A	Security release
3.1.1	22.2	2 September 2025	2025-08-01	0.3.8.250932	
3.1.2	22.2	8 September 2025	N/A	N/A	Withdrawn
3.1.3	22.2	8 September 2025	N/A	N/A	Critical fixes for Fairphone 6
3.1.4	22.2	22 September 2025	2025-09-01	N/A	
3.2	22.2	27 October 2025	2025-10-01	Updated	Android 15 is now available on many new devices
3.3	22.2	16 December 2025	2025-12-01	Updated	
3.4	22.2	20 January 2026	2026-01-01	0.3.11.250932	Improvements to Murena Voice to Text and App Lounge
3.5	22.2	17 February 2026	2026-02-01	N/A	Fixes for Fairphone 6
3.6	23	23 March 2026	2026-03-01	N/A	/e/ is now based on Android 16. AppLounge fixes, allow to sign in with MicroG
3.7	23	10 April 2026	2026-04-01		
3.7.1	23	20 April 2026	N/A	N/A	Updated the browser
3.7.2	23	27 April 2026	N/A	N/A	Fixed issues with file picker. Exclusive update for Android 14.
3.7.3	23	11 May 2026	2026-05-01	N/A	
4.0	23	11 June 2026	2026-06-01	0.3.15.250932	Fixed network issues. App download/install flow enhanced. Support for shared libs added. Chrome support added. Browser's autofill enabled by default. Calculator app implemented clear button. New wallpapers and icons. Added a new option to hide microG from selected third-party apps.
4.1.1	23	20 July 2026	2026-07-01	Updated	Backup and restore functionality. Passwords app implemented. Offline voice-to-text added. App Lounge speed enhancements.
4.2	23	18 August 2026	2026-08-01	N/A	Murena Backup UI enhancements.
4.3	23	21 September 2026	2026-09-01	N/A	General Backup & Restore enhancements.
4.3.1	23	1 October 2026	N/A	N/A	Minor update exclusive to the Fairphone 4.

== See also ==
- Comparison of mobile operating systems
- Criticism of Google
- DeGoogle
- List of custom Android distributions
