= Fairphone 5 =

Fifth phone model by Fairphone

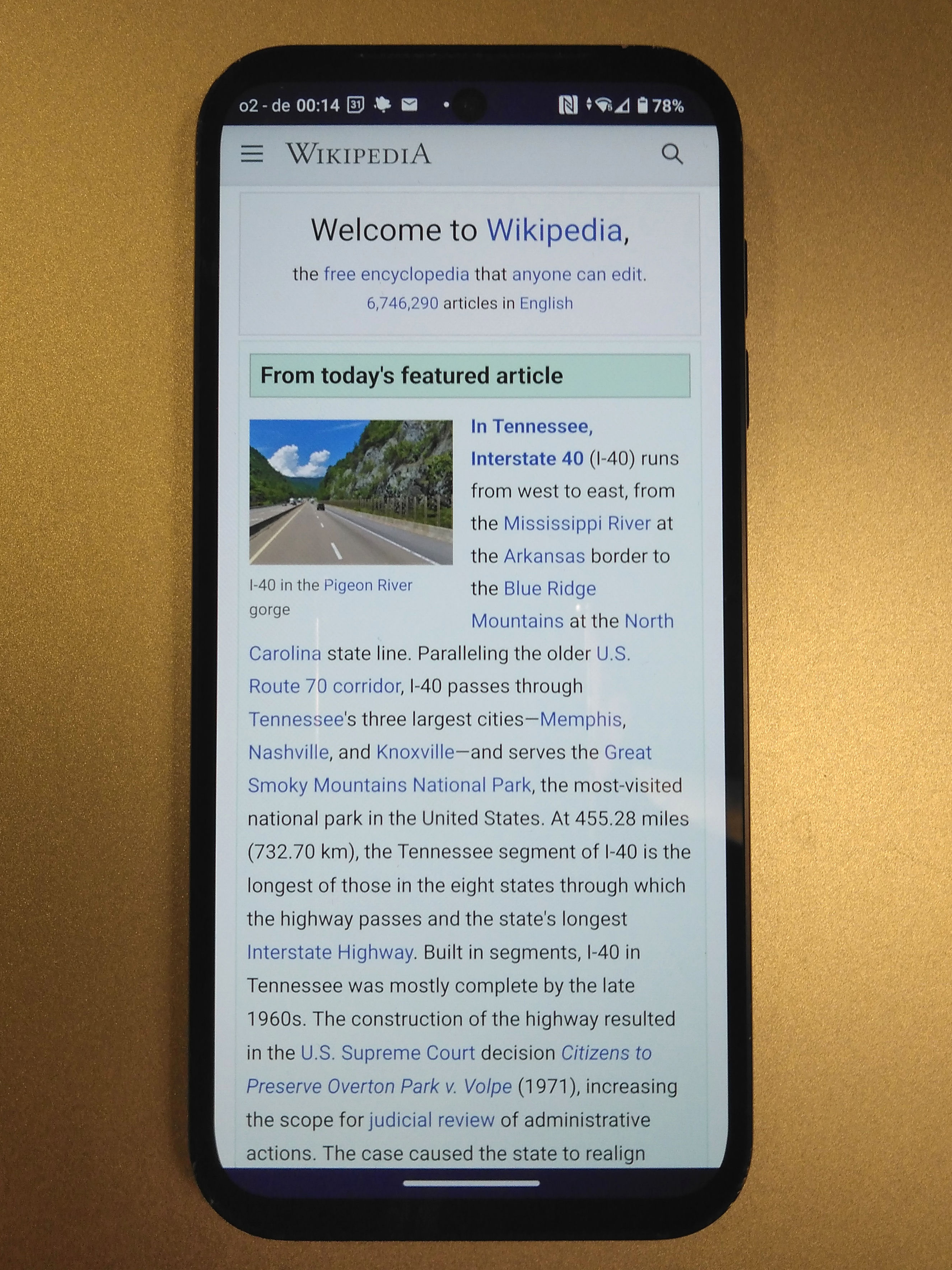
- Fairphone 5
- Brand: Fairphone
- Type: Phablet
- First released: 30 August 2023; 2 years ago
- Availability by region: Western Europe
- Discontinued: January 2026
- Units sold: 150,000+
- Predecessor: Fairphone 4
- Successor: Fairphone 6
- Form factor: Slate
- Dimensions: 161.6 mm × 75.83 mm × 9.6 mm (6.362 in × 2.985 in × 0.378 in)
- Weight: 212 g (7.5 oz)
- Operating system: Original: Android 13; Upgradable: Android 14 Android 15
- System-on-chip: Qualcomm QCM6490
- CPU: Kryo 670
- GPU: Adreno 643
- Memory: 6 GB, 8 GB
- Storage: 128 GB, 256 GB
- Removable storage: Micro SD up to 2 TB
- SIM: Nano SIM and eSIM
- Battery: Li-Ion 4200 mAh
- Charging: 30 W fast charging
- Rear camera: 2 modules. 50 MP, f/1.88, (wide), 1/1.56", 1.0μm, PDAF, OIS, 48 MP, f/2.2, (ultrawide), 1/2.51", 0.7μm, PDAF, TOF 3D, (depth)
- Front camera: 50 MP, f/2.45, (wide), 1/2.6", 0.64μm
- Display: 90 Hz 6.46″ OLED FHD+ display with 1224 × 2700 pixels, 20:9 ratio (≈459 PPI density)
- Connectivity: Wi-Fi 6E; Bluetooth 5.2; NFC; Dual band GNSS (GPS/GLONASS/BeiDou/Galileo); USB-C 3.0 (DisplayPort, USB-OTG)
- Data inputs: Accelerometer; Ambient light sensor; Fingerprint scanner; Gyroscope; Digital compass; Proximity sensor
- Water resistance: IP55
- Website: shop.fairphone.com/fairphone-5

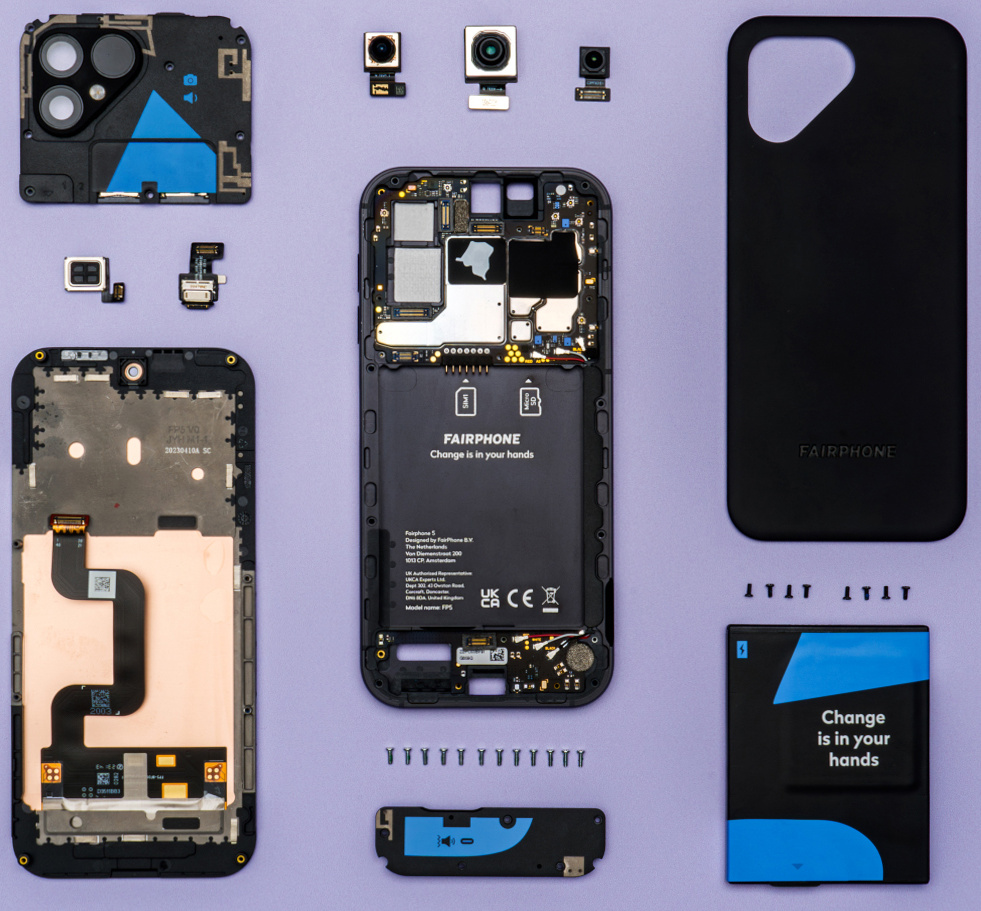
Teardown of Fairphone 5, showing internal components of the phone

Fairphone 5 is a smartphone designed and marketed by Fairphone, following its Fairphone 4. Announced on 30 August 2023, the Fairphone 5 has been shipping since 14 September 2023. As of August 2023, the company was focused on Western Europe with no planned expansions into the United States.

== Specifications ==
Fairphone 5 is a modular smartphone, making it easily repairable and customisable by the user. It supports 5G and Wi-Fi 6E connectivity, and has a 4,200 mAh user replaceable battery. The phone is sold in configurations with 128 GB of storage and 6 GB RAM, and 256 GB of storage and 8 GB RAM. It has three 50 MP cameras with optical image stabilization, an IP55 rating, and a 90 Hz refresh rate.

The phone ships with Android 13, though users can switch to other operating systems. It is reported that it will receive five major Android updates and eight years of security patches. This is possible because the system-on-chip it uses is intended for industrial internet of things applications and will have a longer support life than a SoC intended for consumer devices.

== Reception ==
Samuel Gibbs of The Guardian applauded the effort to create the most sustainable and longest-lasting phone while noting the tradeoffs that come with this long-lasting phone. The Verge called the phone a "lesson in delayed gratification", referring to the higher upfront cost for a longer lasting phone. Wired described it as "mediocre" but "all about the mission." DxOMark gave the phone a score of 108 for the camera, ranking it at 103rd among all phones, and 25th among phones within the similar price range. It mentions that the Fairphone 5 is a: "Significant improvement in camera performance, both in photo and video, over its predecessor." Android Police praised the phone for finally having a "modern design" but expressed concerns about how the processor will perform after years of use.

== See also ==
- List of open-source mobile phones
- Modular phone
