= IodéOS =

Android-based operating system

iodé
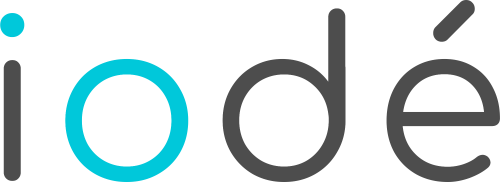
- Developer: iodé technologies
- Latest release: 7 / 5 December 2025; 10 months ago
- Repository: gitlab.com/iode
- Available in: Multilingual
- Official website: iode.tech

iodéOS is an Android-based mobile operating system developed by French company iodé. The operating system is a fork of LineageOS and does not include Google Play Services, instead using MicroG as a free and open-source replacement. As of October 2025, some 52 devices are supported, and a Generic System Image (GSI) based on Android 14 is available for unsupported devices.

== Software ==
iodéOS is presented as a privacy-oriented fork of LineageOS combined with MicroG and a firewall. From 2020 through November 2022, iodéOS was closed source and included proprietary apps. In November 2022, the company announced it was releasing version 3.3 as "open source" with options for uninstalling default apps. No license terms were specified, and multiple licenses can be found in each repository on GitLab, including Apache2 and AGPL. iodéOS comes with a set of default apps and utilities that can be optionally installed upon startup. Among these are app stores: F-Droid and Aurora Store, MicroG, the Iodé Browser, which is based on Firefox, Thunderbird as email client, CoMaps for maps, and the Iodé app (a tracking-prevention control center), and parental control.

== Reception ==
According to Stefan Mey of heise.de and "Sunny" of tarnkappe.info, iodéOS includes hosts file based ad and tracker blocking. According to "Sunny" of tarnkappe.info, users may install a VPN or an additional adblocker. According to Stefan Mey of heise.de, the operating system comes with F-Droid and Aurora Store app stores pre-installed. Manuel Vonau of AndroidPolice.com said it was "good" that the setup of a pre-installed phone isn't "much more complicated than with any other phone." However, inclusion of the Aurora Store meant the operating system still communicated with Google APIs and breaks Google's Terms of Service, but no warning is given.

In a review of iodéOS in April 2023, pentester Mike Kuketz said "iodéOS has been relatively successful in reducing Google's data collection mania - but not completely." As examples, to speed up location, the system accesses the Google SUPL server, and the included browser uses Google Safe Browsing. Kuketz warned, if you enable microG, more connections to Google will be made. Other criticisms included: Delayed delivery of (security) updates; Older devices do not receive full security updates of proprietary components like bootloader or firmware; and iodéOS does not support Verified Boot on every device. Kuketz concluded, "iodéOS could be improved especially by faster delivery of (security) updates. Overall, however, some restrictions in terms of security have to be accepted. Ultimately, iodéOS is mainly aimed at privacy-sensitive users who want to continue using their (older) devices."

== See also ==
- Comparison of mobile operating systems
- Criticism of Google
- DeGoogle
- List of custom Android distributions
