= Jolla =

Finnish technology company

Jolla Oy
- Type: Osakeyhtiö (Limited company)
- Industry: Consumer electronics; Artificial intelligence; Technology
- Predecessor: MeeGo project by Nokia
- Founded: Pirkkala, Finland (29 March 2011; 15 years ago)
- Founder: Sami Pienimäki; Jussi Hurmola; Marc Dillon; Stefano Mosconi; Antti Saarnio
- Defunct: 2023
- Successor: Jolla Group Ltd.
- Headquarters: Tampere, Finland
- Area served: Worldwide
- Key people: Sami Pienimäki (CEO)
- Products: Sailfish OS; AppSupport
- Brands: Jolla
- Number of employees: 50
- Website: jolla.com

Jolla Oy (sometimes referred to as Jolla Ltd.) is a Finnish technology company; vendor and developer of Sailfish OS. Headquartered in Tampere, Finland, Jolla has its own research and development offices in Helsinki, Tampere and Cyberport, Hong Kong. Jolla was founded in 2011 by former Nokia staff of the MeeGo project team to use the MeeGo opportunities and its "endless possibilities".

Pronounced 'yolla', the company name is Finnish for "dinghy" (a small agile boat or life rescue boat) and it refers to the possibility for the company to compete against giants like Samsung and Apple pictured in antithesis as big cruise ships. Then, the community and the media used the name as an ironic joke about the "burning platform" memo, which contained the metaphor "jump into the cold sea water" or "burn with burning platform" used in context of the Nokia business activities. In 2024, to escape Russia's investors due to the Ukrainian war, the Jolla initial company filed for bankruptcy, continuing its activity under the JollyBoys name.

== History ==
Former logo

In 2005, Nokia created a new GNU distro called OS2005, which shipped with the Nokia 770 Internet Tablet. It was renamed Maemo (version 5) and shipped with the Nokia N900 in 2009. An alliance of Nokia and Intel merged their Maemo and Moblin (also a free software GNU distro) projects into a new project called MeeGo in 2010. The same year, Nokia announced that the N8 would be the last flagship phone to run Symbian, and "Going forward, N-series devices will be based on MeeGo".

Unexpectedly, in 2011 the MeeGo project was cancelled, regardless of MeeGo's potential for success, as a cost-cutting measure by then-Nokia CEO, Stephen Elop. In compliance with agreements with Intel, one MeeGo device was released, the Nokia N9, which achieved iconic status.

Despite the N9 market success, the MeeGo project in Nokia was already doomed and a general atmosphere around it was having more and more negative influence on the MeeGo team and other Nokia employees. As a result, in October 2011, some of the MeeGo team left Nokia to form the project called Jolla, aimed at developing new opportunities with the GNU MeeGo OS, using funding from Nokia's "Bridge" program which helps establish and support start-up companies by ex-Nokia employees.

At the time, Nokia was supporting employees leaving the company with a €25,000 start-up grant, but Jolla's founders had not given any rights to patents or other intellectual property to Jolla. Jolla's Sailfish OS, which used middleware core stack of Mer, is a direct successor to MeeGo and the Jolla is successor of N9, but used only the open-sourced components of MeeGo, while the closed-source user interface design (of codename Harmattan) for all future devices had to be developed from scratch. As a result, new mobile standards were established together with Mer.

On 6 July 2012, Jolla publicly announced its intention to develop new smartphones that used a gesture-oriented swipe interface corresponding to former Nokia's Harmattan UI experience. They named their operating system "Sailfish OS", which includes a gesture-based user interface developed using Qt, QML and HTML5, as did Nokia's N9.

Jolla cooperated with others to grow their applications and the MeeGo platform. On 17 September 2013, it announced that the phone will be capable of running Android applications, thanks to the built-in Alien Dalvik. Due to formal limitations, the Google Play Store had to be installed by the end user manually. The ability to run Android applications on Linux has grown into the AppSupport product, which is offered for running Android apps on in-car infotainment systems and other embedded systems. This appears to be Jolla's main source of income, as of 2022-23.

On 7 July 2015, after a failure of cooperation with Chinese manufacturer to deliver the Jolla Tablet, Jolla announced it would spin off its hardware operations to a brand new company, and continue to focus on current activities as a developer and licenser of the Sailfish OS.

In November 2015, Jolla had to lay off half of its employees due to financial problems caused by delayed financing from an investor. On 21 December 2015, forced to cancel the Jolla Tablet project, Jolla announced that they would be "shipping a small batch of the Jolla Tablet to early backers during early 2016" but "all of our backers will not get a Jolla Tablet", because their Chinese manufacturer had already produced a batch as a consequence of delayed financing, while it was impossible to produce more as essential components were no longer produced. Subsequently, in April 2016, Jolla launched a campaign to refund all the tablet payments that had been made during the crowd-sourcing campaign, but most backers lost their money.

After the setbacks with the tablet production, Jolla concentrated on developing the Sailfish mobile operating system. It acquired new investors in 2016, among them the Russian company Votron. In March 2018 they were joined by Rostelecom (which is state owned) as investor, which took over Votron and OMP. Rostelecom owns 75% of the Sailfish based Aurora OS.

In August 2017, Sailfish X was introduced for the Sony Xperia X smartphone. Support for the Sony Xperia XA2 was added as beta in November 2018. Support for the newer Sony Xperia 10 was added in November 2019.

In February 2022, Jolla announced that it has discontinued its business in Russia during 2021 and is seeking a shareholder structure without Russian ownership.

In November 2023, Jolla announced that Pirkanmaa District Court had approved a corporate restructuring plan which would see Jolla's business and staff acquired by a new company owned by the Jolla management team.

In December 2023, German developers ported SailfishOS successfully to Siemens GigaSet GX290 Smartphone model.

In May 2024, the original Jolla company filed for bankruptcy, its business activities having been taken over in 2023 by the Jollyboys company established by Jolla's former management.

On 5 December 2025 the Jolla Phone (2026) was announced at the Mobile World Congress 2026. Delivery started in July 2026.

== Sailfish OS ==
=== Operating system ===
Sailfish OS is an operating system that can be adapted to different mobile devices.

Sailfish OS is an evolution of the Nokia MeeGo and Mer project. It is based on GNU free software code powered with C, C++, Qt and QML. The core is developed on Linux kernel that enables a wide hardware support.

Sailfish OS has its own native applications that can be developed and uploaded in the store through the portal harbour.jolla.com. Sailfish application are complemented by the Android ecosystem. Here with Alien Dalvik, third-party Android applications become compatible with Sailfish.

Sailfish OS has an open core that can be improved by the community but also a proprietary UI that is seen as the succession of the Nokia N9 interface. Basic UI applications, like mail, contacts, camera are provided by Jolla and are under continuous development.

Sailfish OS 1 was launched in December 2013 with the first Jolla phone.

Sailfish OS 2 was implemented in November 2015 for the Jolla Tablet and made compatible for all other products onward.

Sailfish OS 3 was released on 11 November 2018. This version and its ongoing series of updates introduced a faster user interface. The new generation will be focused on privacy and security as well as extending the support to new hardware.

Sailfish OS 4 was released on 16 February 2021.

Sailfish OS 5 was released on 24 February 2025.

=== Sailfish OS products ===
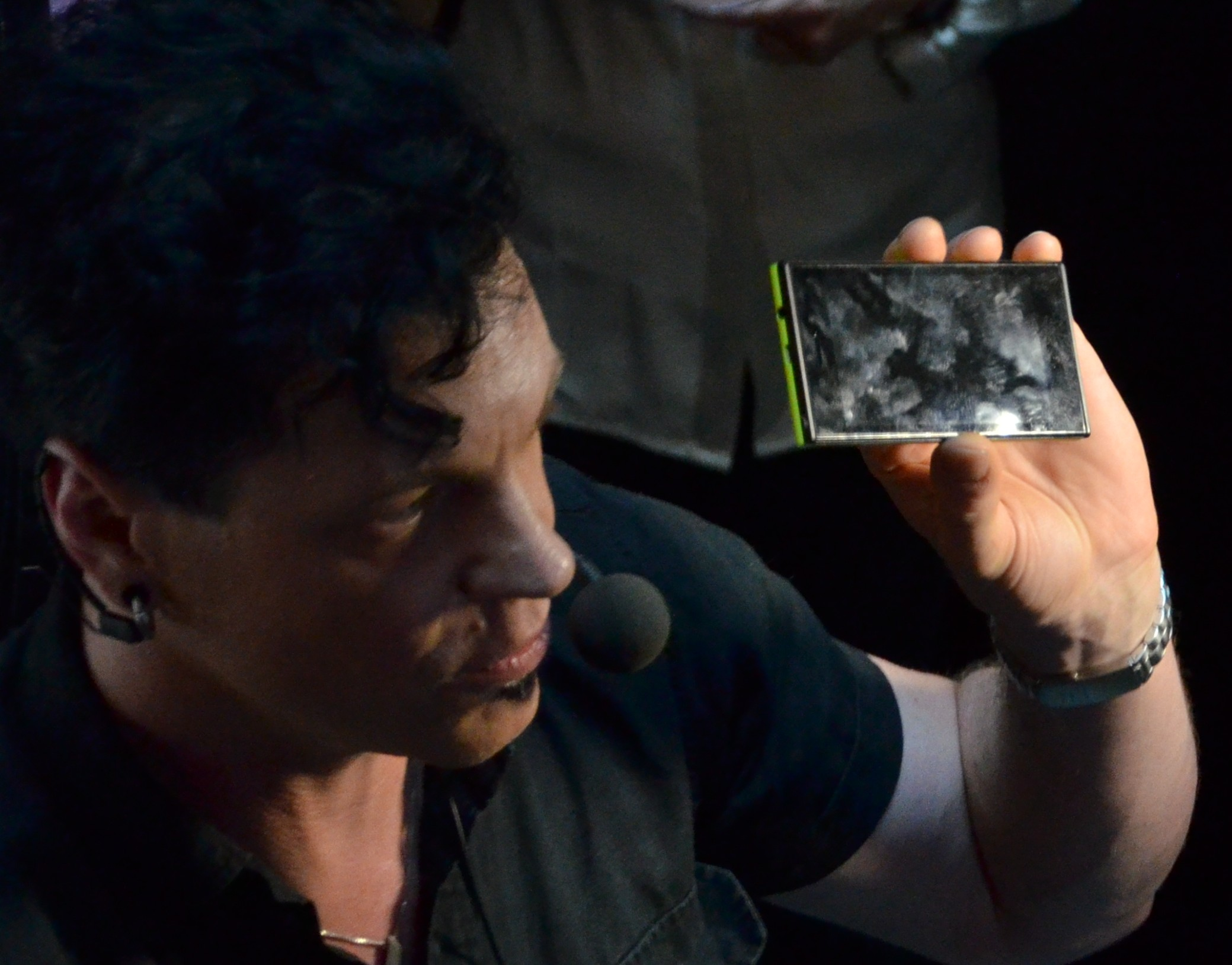
Marc Dillon showing Jolla's phone. The event was titled Jolla Love Day at KlausK, Helsinki.

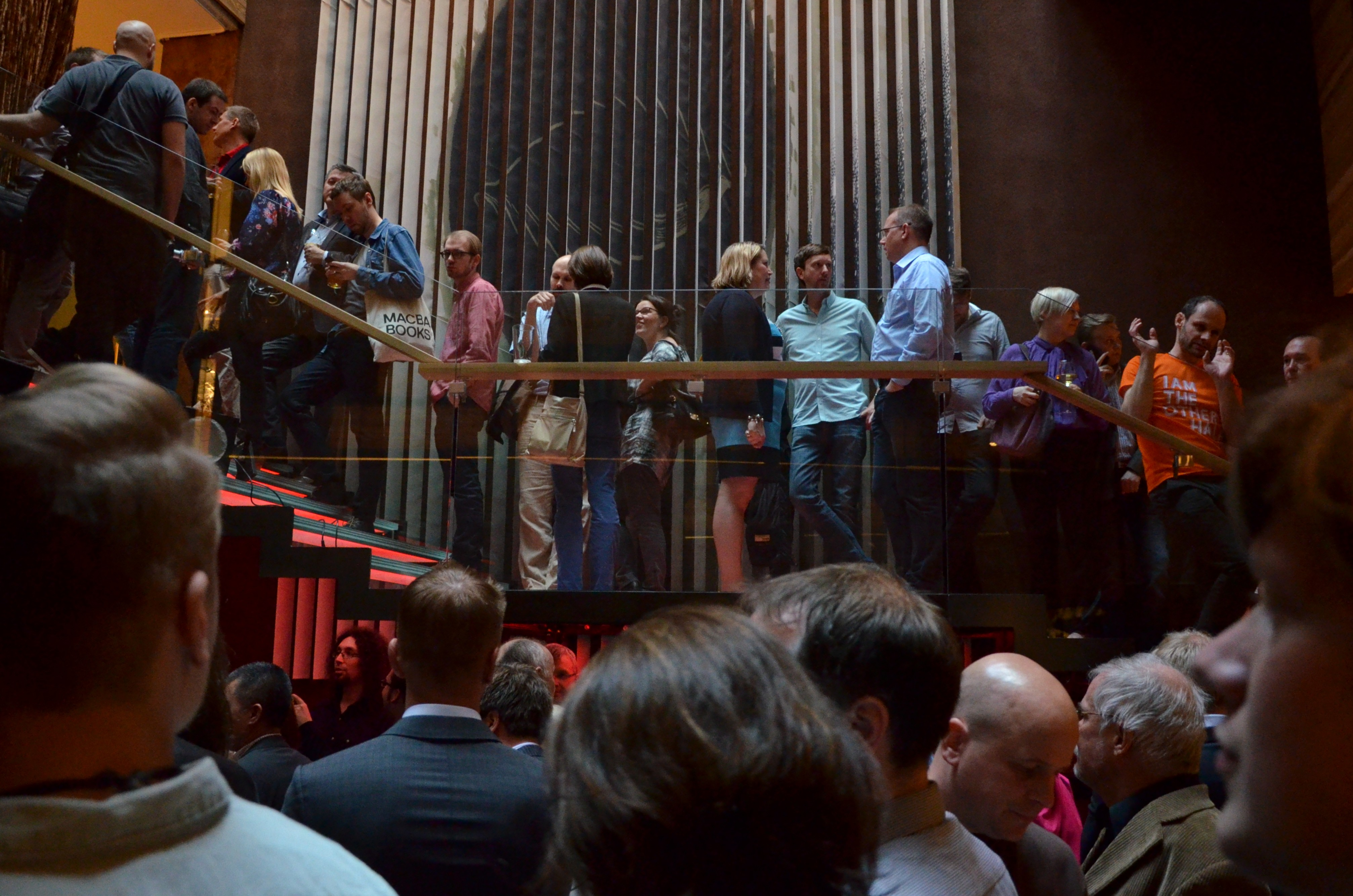
People waiting to get hands-on with Jolla's phone

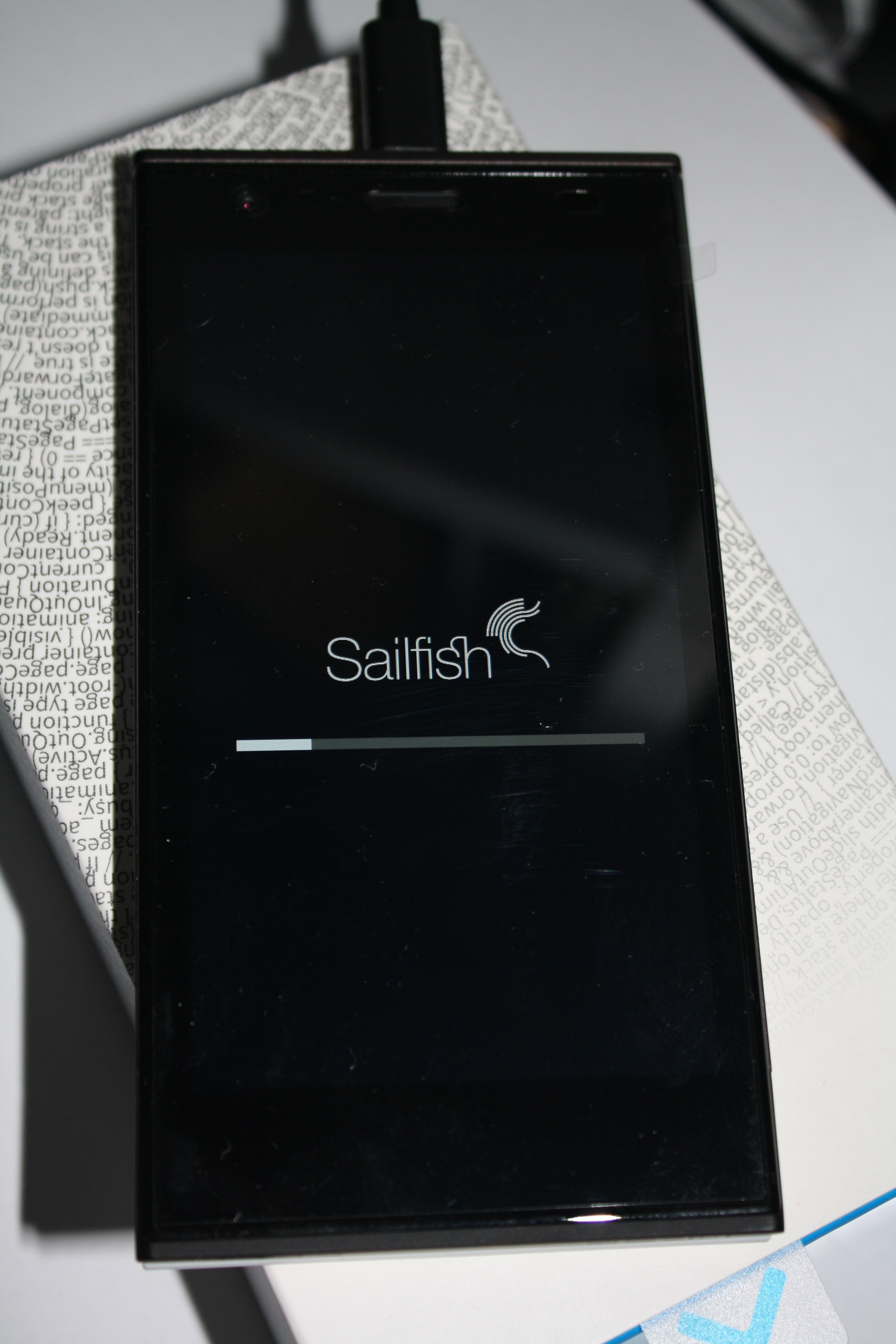
Jolla's mobile phone

- Jolla Phone (November 2013) - smartphone with Sailfish OS, 4.5in IPS qHD display, 16 GB storage, 1 GB RAM, a microSD slot and an 8 MP camera.
- Jolla Tablet - tablet with a display of 7.8 inches and over 300dpi, 2 GB of RAM and a Quad-core 1.8 GHz processor.
- Jolla C - a Limited Edition developer and community phone. 5.0 inch IPS display, 16 GB storage, 2 GB RAM, MicroSD slot, 8 and 2 megapixel cameras
- Sailfish X Program, first announced for the Sony Xperia X in October 2017 and later expanded to support variants of the Xperia XA2, Xperia 10, Xperia 10 II, Xperia 10 III devices.
- Gemini, by Planet Computers in January 2018 – Sailfish OS, 4G and WLAN, full physical keyboard, 5.99-inch screen, 5 MP camera and stereo speakers.
- The Jolla C2 Community Phone is Jolla's second Limited Edition developer and community phone, available on Jolla's own store.
- Jolla Phone (2026) - smartphone pre-installed with Sailfish 5.
- Commodore Callback 8020 - upcoming 2000s-style flip phone with Sailfish OS technology.

=== Support ===
The original Jolla phone was provided with a total of 34 updates and upgrades for 7 years.

== AppSupport ==
AppSupport uses a Linux Container (LXC) to run an Android-like environment within an embedded Linux system, synchronizing contacts and launchers and bridging notifications, media controls and libraries, cameras and networks with the host system, resulting in a highly integrated app environment. Although designed for SailfishOS, it has been ported to in-car entertainment systems, and unofficially to other mobile operating systems.

Jolla's November 2022 whitepaper claimed a 99.4% pass rate on the Android Compatibility Test Suite, at about 97% of the performance of an Android Open Source Project environment. As of that date, AppSupport supports Android versions up to Android 10 (API 29, released in September 2019) and install unmodified APK files.

With the upcoming release of SailfishOS 5 in February 2025, AppSupport supports API 33 (Android 13).

== See also ==
- HMD Global
- Alcatel Mobile
- D.Phone
