= Maliit =

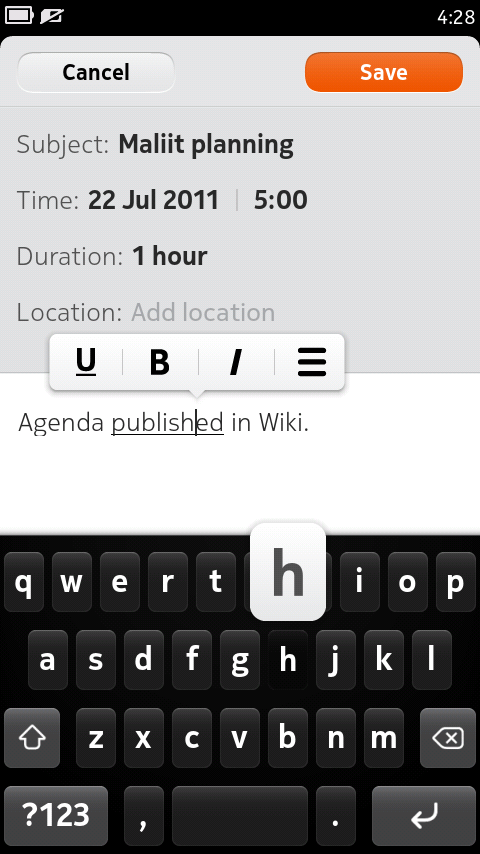
- Maliit's virtual keyboard running on the Nokia N9
- Original author: Nokia
- Developers: Jan Arne Petersen and contributors
- Release: June 30, 2010; 16 years ago
- Stable release: 2.3.0 / July 6, 2022; 4 years ago
- Written in: C++
- Operating system: Unix-like, Windows
- Platform: Qt
- Available in: Multilingual
- Type: Input method
- License: GNU LGPL, version 2.1 (framework); GNU LGPL, version 3.0 only (Maliit Keyboard, default GUI); 3-clause BSD license (plugins)
- Website: maliit.github.io

Maliit is an input method framework for computers with particular focus on implementing virtual keyboards. Designed mostly for touchscreen devices, Maliit allows the inputting of text without the presence of a physical keyboard. More advanced features such as word correction and prediction are also available.

Originating as part of MeeGo, Maliit is free software licensed under LGPL. Maliit ships as a standard component of LG webOS, Plasma Mobile, SailfishOS, LuneOS, and Ubuntu Touch.

== History ==
Maliit was originally developed as part of MeeGo by Nokia who eventually shipped it as part of MeeGo Handset "Day 1" software platform.

In the early 2010s, Maliit was deployed as a standard component of Nokia N9, KDE Plasma Active, OLPC devices, and Ubuntu Touch phones.

After the MeeGo project ended, Maliit was transferred into an independent project by free software consulting firm Openismus. The first formally independent release was 0.80.0 on June 20, 2011.

Maliit 0.99, released on March 27, 2013, switched from Qt 4 to Qt 5.

In May 2016, a KDE developer announced that instead of Maliit, QtVirtualKeyboard had been integrated into KDE Plasma 5.7. In September 2020, Maliit was made the default keyboard in Plasma Mobile.

On April 2, 2021 Maliit 2.0 has been released.

== Features ==
Among Maliit's features are a plugin-based architecture, word correction and prediction, multitouch, and context sensitive layouts.

When running on Linux kernel, handling of the input hardware relies on evdev. Maliit supports X11 as well as Wayland.

== See also ==
- List of input methods for UNIX platforms
