= D.Phone =

Chinese mobile phone manufacturer

- Headquarters: China
- Products: Retail mobile phones and accessories
- Website: dixintong.com

D.Phone is a Chinese retailer of mobile phones and accessories. Founded in 1993, it has currently over 1300 stores, more than 800 directly owned and others franchise businesses, in 25 provinces and municipalities in China. The company has received US$22 million investment in 2006 from 3i.

On 2012-07-16, the Finland-based MeeGo smartphone company Jolla established its first sales contract with D.Phone.

D.Phone is the member of Sailfish Alliance established by Jolla in 2011.

== See also ==
- Sailfish Alliance
- Jolla
