= OFono =

Open-source project for GSM/UMTS mobile applications

oFono
- Original authors: Intel and Nokia
- Developers: Aki Niemi, Marcel Holtmann, Denis Kenzior, Claudio Takahasi, etc.
- Initial release: 11 May 2009
- Stable release: 2.16 / 26 March 2025
- Written in: C
- Operating system: Linux
- Type: Mobile
- License: GNU General Public License
- Website: git.kernel.org/pub/scm/network/ofono/ofono.git/about/
- Repository: git.kernel.org/pub/scm/network/ofono/ofono.git

oFono is a free software project for mobile telephony (GSM/UMTS) applications. It is built on 3GPP standards and uses a high-level D-Bus API for use by telephony applications. oFono is free software released under the terms of the GNU General Public License v2.

== History ==
oFono was jointly announced for Linux by Intel and Nokia on 11 May 2009. Nokia has since shipped oFono with the MeeGo-based N9.

After the MeeGo project ended, Intel collaborated with Samsung on a new Linux-based project named Tizen. The first release of Tizen contained another telephony stack but in 2012 they announced to replace that with oFono.

In early 2013 Canonical Ltd announced Ubuntu Touch which also uses oFono.

As another successor project to MeeGo, Sailfish OS also uses oFono for telephony.

Since version 1.4 (released in August 2016), NetworkManager can use oFono as a modem manager.

Maemo Leste is using oFono.

PipeWire allows using it to connect to Bluetooth headsets since version 0.3.8.

Plasma Mobile used oFono before switching to ModemManager.

== See also ==
- Maemo
