= Jolla (smartphone) =

Smartphone model

- Jolla phone front
- Manufacturer: Qisda Corporation.
- First released: 27 November 2013; 12 years ago
- Availability by region: 27 November 2013 (Finnish pre-orders) / 11 December 2013 (Finland) / December 2013 (pre-orders) / Q1 2014 (worldwide)
- Predecessor: Nokia N9 (by MeeGo, community & spiritual legacy)
- Compatible networks: GSM/3G/4G/LTE
- Dimensions: Height: 131 mm (5.2 in); Width: 68 mm (2.7 in); Thickness: 9.9 mm (0.39 in)
- Weight: 141 g (5 oz) (0.311 lb)
- Operating system: Sailfish OS
- CPU: Qualcomm Snapdragon 400 1.4 GHz dual-core processor
- Memory: 1 GB RAM
- Storage: 16 GB
- Removable storage: microSDHC, up to 32GB is officially supported; up to 64GB if microSDXC card is formatted to Jolla-supported formats like Fat32.
- Battery: 2100 mAh user-replaceable battery Up to approximately 9 to 10 hours of talk time (GSM/3G, respectively)
- Rear camera: 8 megapixel AF camera with LED flash
- Front camera: 2 megapixel front-facing camera
- Display: 4.5" IPS qHD (960 × 540 px) "Estrade" display
- Connectivity: WiFi-N; Bluetooth; GPS; A-GPS; GLONASS; NFC
- Data inputs: Capacitive touchscreen microphone
- Development status: Released
- SAR: Head SAR 0.546 W/kg; Body SAR 1.470 W/kg
- Website: jolla.com

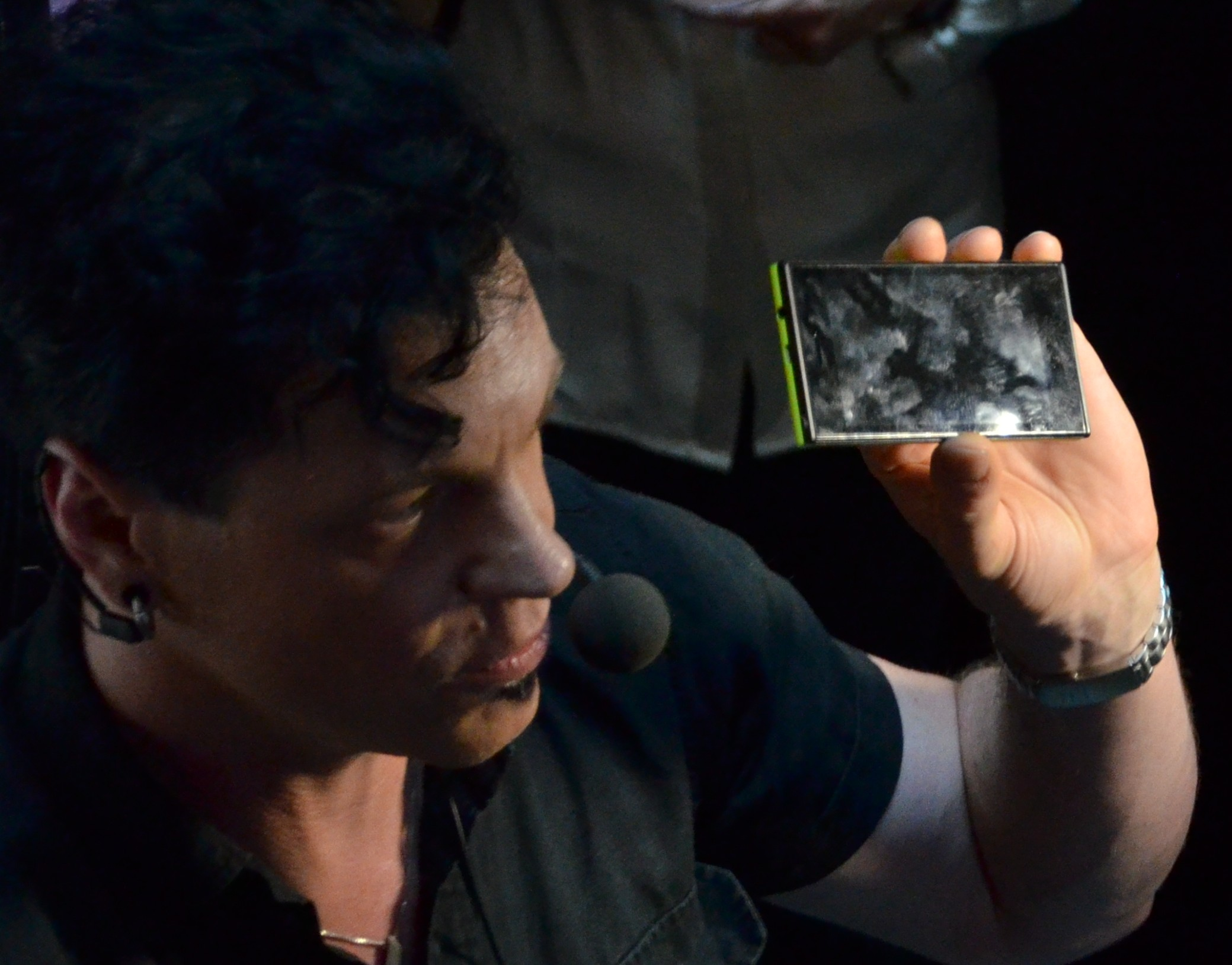
Marc Dillon showing the Jolla's phone at Jolla love day

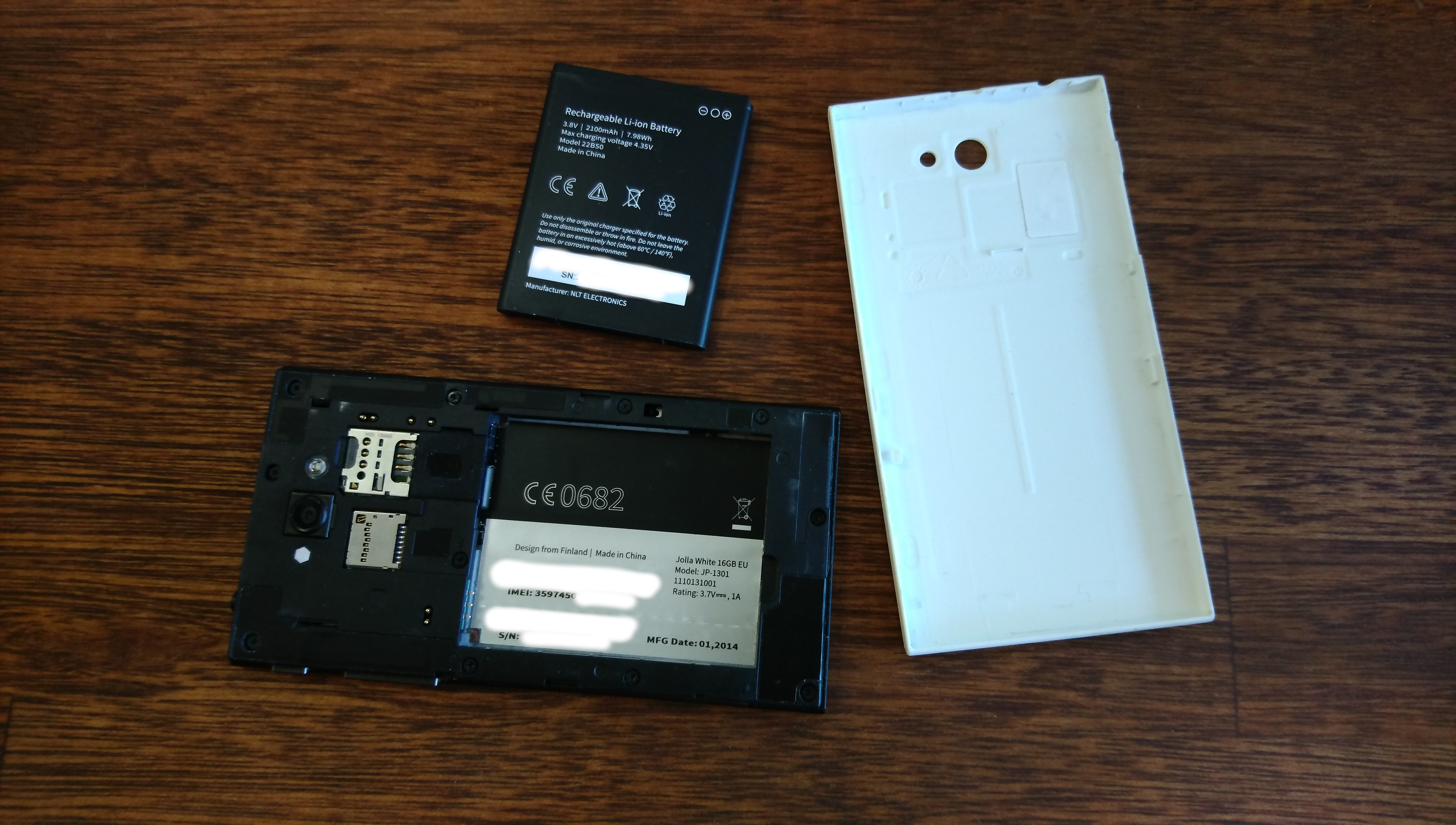
Picture of Jolla phone (J1) behind the other half back cover: "Design from Finland | Made in China".

The Jolla smartphone (or Jolla 1 or J1) is a smartphone produced by Jolla that runs the Sailfish OS. Following a successful crowdfunding campaign, it was manufactured in China and released on 27 November 2013. The Jolla smartphone is no longer supported by Sailfish OS updates, the last update compatible being v3.4.0, released on 22 September 2020.

Like the Nokia N9, the Jolla departed from the at that time conventional smartphone home button centric user interface and only featured a power button and a volume up and down rocker switch. Instead it relied on a swipe interface to close and switch between screens and applications would access a pulley menu to select menu items inside applications.

In addition to the comparably limited number of native Sailfish applications available in the Jolla app store, the Jolla Phone featured the proprietary Alien Dalvik to provide support for installing Android-applications (Note: Up to version 4.1.2 "Jelly Bean") from F-Droid, Aurora Store (an opensource Google Play Store implementation) or others like Aptoide.

The J1 smartphone is not to be confused with the Jolla Phone (2026), a successor device announced on 5 December 2025.

== First unveiled device ==
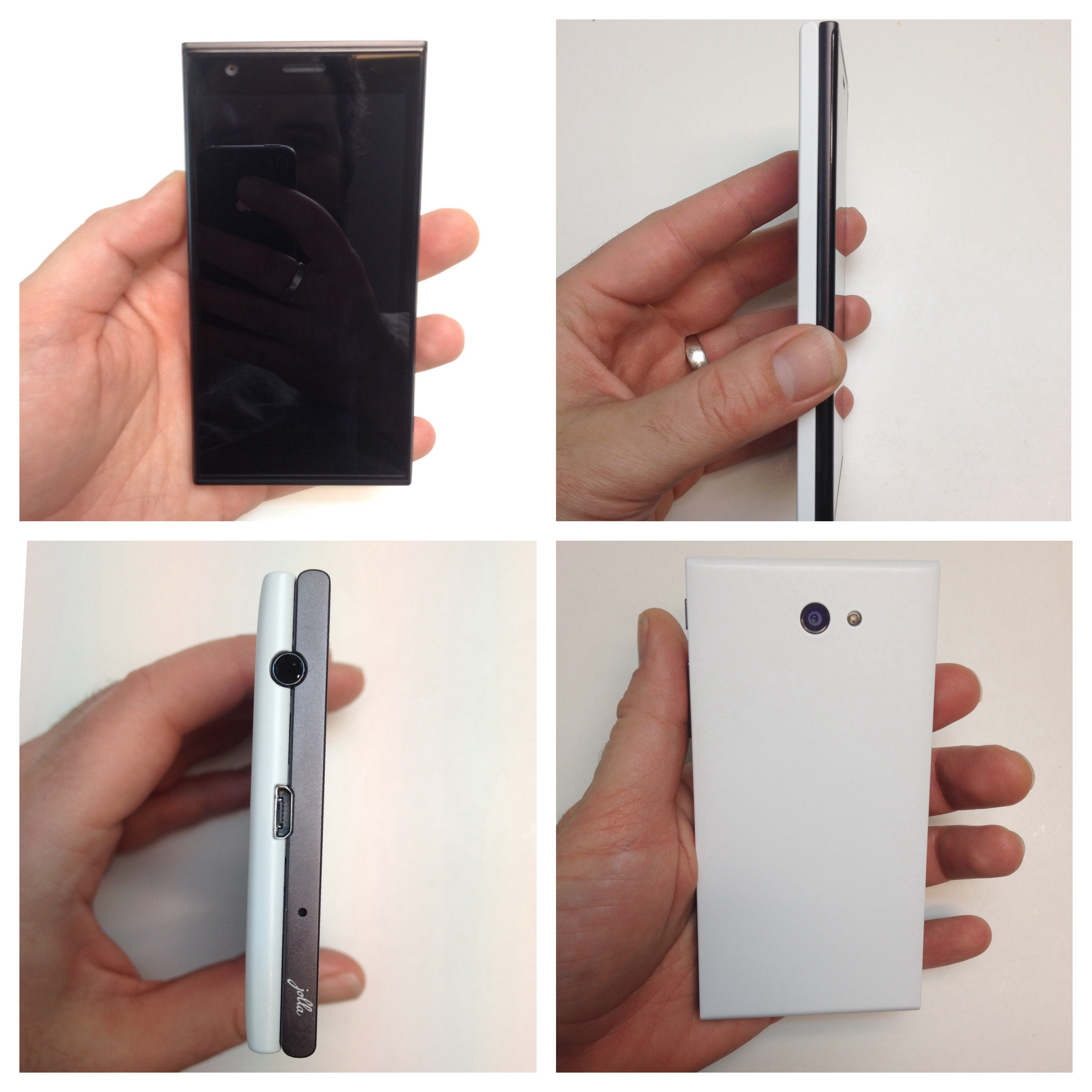

On 20 May 2013, after IamTheOtherHalf internet campaign, Jolla unveiled the following details and design of their first device:

- 4.5 in IPS qHD (540×960) "Estrade" display
- Qualcomm Snapdragon 400 1.4 GHz dual-core
- 16 GB of storage memory
- microSD support
- 8 MPix AF camera, back
- 2 MPix camera, front
- 2100 mAh user-replaceable battery
- "The Other Half"
- Gesture-based Sailfish OS
- Android applications compliant
- MicroUSB
- 3.5 mm headphone jack
- Buttonless display, gesture navigation
- Device in English language version
- Qt, QML, HTML5 (see: Sailfish OS architecture)

The Sailfish OS SDK was published at the end of February 2013.

The Jolla smartphone is compatible with frequency bands in the ITU region 1: 4G (LTE) bands 3 (1800 MHz), 7 (2600 MHz) and 20 (800 MHz); 3G (WCDMA / UMTS) band 1 (2100 MHz), 8 (900 MHz); 2G (GSM) bands 850 MHz, 900 MHz, 1800 MHz, 1900 MHz. 4G and 3G will work in Europe but support is not guaranteed in other regions, even if a compatible frequency band is used.

=== Retail availability ===
Jolla started shipping the phone in late November 2013. At first the phone could only be ordered on the web from within the European Union.

The phone also became available in the stores of the Finnish carrier DNA on 11 December 2013.

On 28 April 2014, the Jolla phone became available in Estonia at the outlets of Elisa Eesti, the first operator outside Finland to offer the phone in their shops.

On 25 July 2014 Jolla opened the first Jolla store in Kazakhstan in association with Mobile Invest.

On 12 August 2014 Jolla was launched in Hong Kong in a partnership with 3 Hong Kong.

In September 2014, Jolla launched in India on e-retailer Snapdeal.

In November 2014, Jolla launched in Russia.

=== Support ===
Sailfish OS updates were provided for the Jolla 1 for 7 years.

Other Linux distributions like postmarketOS continue to provide updates for the original Jolla phone but don't support calls, SMS or mobile data.

== Jolla Phone (2026) ==
The Jolla Phone (2026) is the successor to the J1, announced on 5 December 2025 and shown at Mobile World Congress 2026. It is marketed as an independent European Linux smartphone, emphasising privacy, long-term software support, and Android app compatibility without Google services.

=== Hardware ===
The device is powered by a MediaTek Dimensity 7100 processor with 8 GB of LPDDR4X RAM and 256 GB of UFS 2.2 storage, expandable via microSD. The display is a 6.36" FullHD AMOLED panel at 390 ppi, protected by Gorilla Glass. The camera system consists of a 50 MP primary and 13 MP ultrawide on the rear. The 5,500 mAh battery is user-replaceable, continuing the J1 design tradition. A physical privacy switch disabling the microphone, camera, and Bluetooth is included, alongside a side-mounted fingerprint scanner. Connectivity includes 5G, Wi-Fi 6, Bluetooth 5.4, NFC, and dual nano-SIM.

The Other Half (TOH) modular accessory interface returns with 7 pogo pins and I3C bus support, with full CAD specifications released to enable community hardware development.

=== Software ===
The phone ships with Sailfish OS 5.2.11. Jolla guarantees a minimum of five years of OS updates. A review by Gadget Hacks noted that Sailfish OS treats privacy as a fundamental architectural principle, offering real-time visibility into network connections and granular data flow controls not available on mainstream platforms.

=== Release ===
Pre-orders opened in December 2025 at €499, capped at 10,000 units, with the first batch selling out in under 48 hours. Retail pricing is expected at €599–699. The phone is initially available in the EU, UK, Norway, and Switzerland. The Associated Press covered the device at MWC 2026 as a privacy-focused handset for Europeans. First batch shipping was in July 2026.

== See also ==
- Sailfish OS
- Jolla
