= Commodore Callback =

The Commodore Callback 8020 is a clamshell mobile phone developed by Commodore International Corporation, announced on June 16, 2026. Intended for digital detoxing, the phone runs on a customized Sailfish OS that gives access to essential apps but strictly blocks social media. It works on 4G (LTE) cellular networks.

== Software ==
It runs a customized build of Sailfish OS developed with Jolla, which includes the underlying Linux kernel and Sailfish Android compatibility layer, allowing it to run the majority of Android apps. The phone uses microG for compatibility with Google Play Services libraries. As a self proclaimed "digital detox" philosophy, the Callback 8020 software also maintains a system-level block on social media, web browsers, and workplace platforms.

The Callback 8020 also contains an app store for "whitelisted" apps named Commostore, which contains a curated range of communication, transport and non-visual audio apps (e.g. Spotify). Sailfish's mapping tool, Pure Maps, is preloaded and makes use of the phone's GPS chip. Commodore have also baked the heritage of Commodore 64 into the Callback through the inclusion of a number of preloaded 1980s Commodore 64 games, as well as a recreation of its SID chip sound synthesizer.

== Hardware ==
The Commodore Callback 8020 is built with a chunky plastic exterior shell. The color choices are rooted in 1980s Commodore heritage with a beige, white and silver colorway mimicking the color of the Commodore 64 keyboard, the PET, and the SX-64 respectively, alongside a fully translucent variant that nods to Y2K aesthetic. The body has a retro stylistic protruding stub antenna; it does not house the phone's cellular antenna but instead houses an FM radio antenna.

The phone has an internal 3.25" IPS LCD display with a capacitive touchscreen and a resolution of 480x640 pixels. On the outside is a small segmented LED display designed to mimic the glow of VFD-display 1970s Commodore calculators. It displays time, battery and cell signal, but purposefully does not display notifications. The Commodore Callback contains a MediaTek Helio processor with 4GB memory, has 64GB internal storage memory that is expandable using microSD.

There is also a rear camera, a 48-megapixel Sony sensor with flash, as well as a front-facing camera on the inside. There is a 3.5 mm headphone jack and the audio is backed by ESS and Cirrus Logic digital-to-analog converters (DAC). Other connectivity features include Bluetooth and Wi-Fi.

== Reception ==
Days after the phone was announced by Commodore, there had been some criticism from critics and communities that it was overpriced for what it offered in its specifications. A couple of days later, Commodore reduced the price by a hundred dollars (to $399), achieved by unbundling the premium FiiO headphones and shifting to recycled memory chips.
