= Sailfish OS =

Mobile operating system

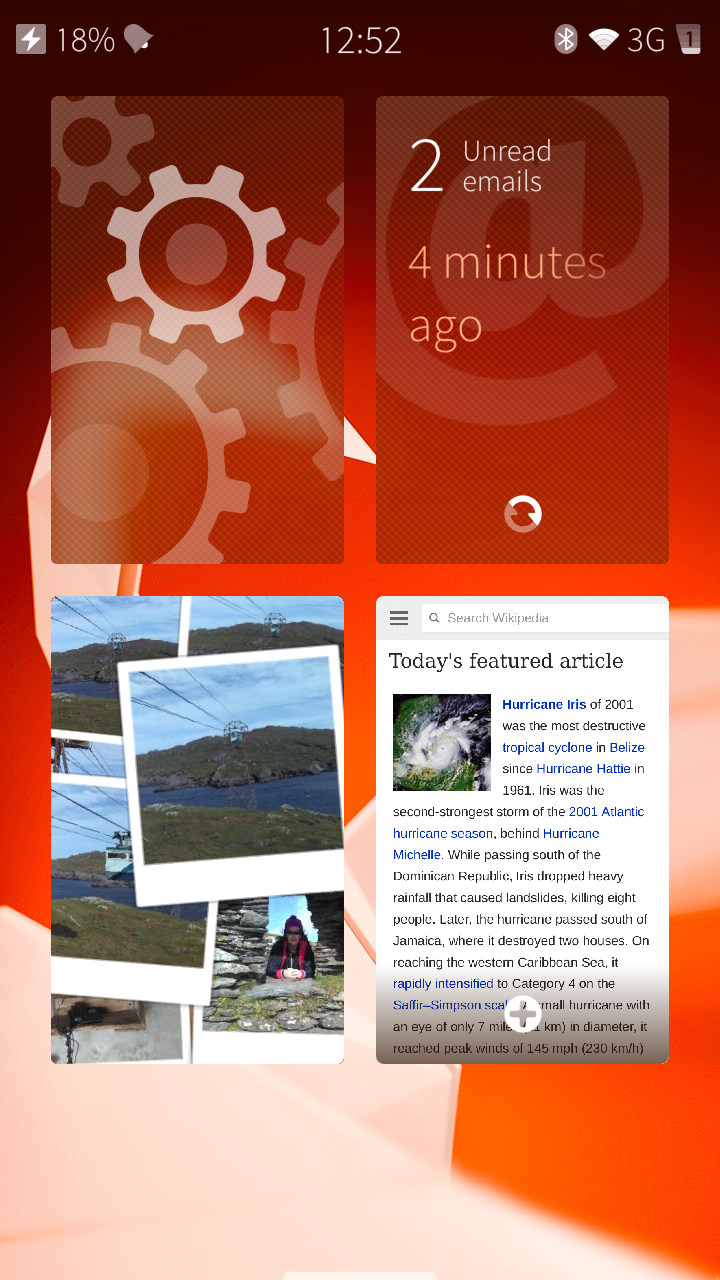
- Sailfish OS version 2.0.2.51 running on Intex Technologies Aqua Fish
- Developer: Jolla
- Written in: Qt/QML, C++
- OS family: Linux (Unix-like)
- Working state: Current
- Source model: Proprietary, with open-source components
- Initial release: 16 November 2013; 13 years ago
- Latest release: 5.1 / 16 June 2026; 5 months ago
- Repository: github.com/sailfishos
- Marketing target: Mobile and general purpose
- Available in: English for development, SDK & supporting documentation; over 21 national languages versions of UI in user's device
- Package manager: RPM Package Manager
- Supported platforms: 32-bit and 64-bit ARM and 64-bit x86
- Kernel type: Linux kernel
- Userland: GNU
- License: For end-user the EULA defines used open source and other licences components with a component's origin.
- Preceded by: MeeGo by alliance of Nokia & Intel
- Official website: sailfishos.org

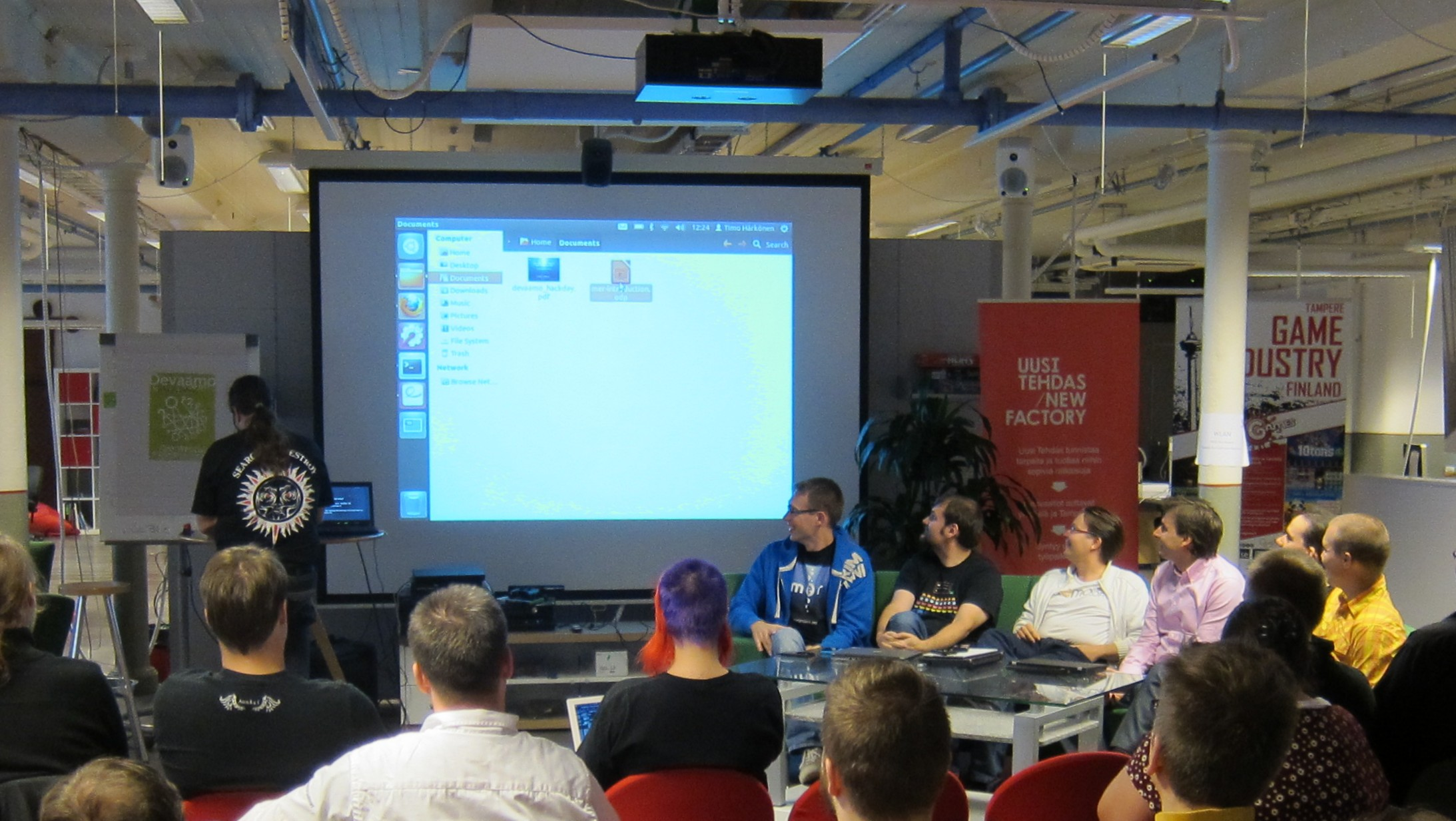
Hackday with Jolla, Mer and Nemo Mobile in September 2012

Sailfish OS is an operating system for mobile phones developed by Jolla. It is Linux-based with AppSupport, a proprietary compatibility layer for Android and custom user interface by Jolla.

The OS first shipped with the original Jolla Phone in 2013; while its sale stopped in 2016, it was supplied with software updates until the end of 2020. It also shipped with Jolla Tablet in 2015 and from other vendors licensing the OS. Since 2026 Sailfish is shipped with the Jolla Phone (2026). The OS is ported by community enthusiasts to third-party mobile devices including smartphones and tablet computers. Sailfish OS is mostly used for mobile phones and tablets.

== History and development ==
The OS is an evolved continuation of the Linux MeeGo OS previously developed by Nokia and Intel which itself relies on combined Maemo and Moblin. This base is extended by Jolla with a custom user interface and default applications.

The User Interface is highly based on gestures and pulley menus.

== Software architecture ==
The Sailfish OS and the Sailfish software development kit (SDK) are based on the Linux kernel and a standard Linux stack. Sailfish OS includes a multi-tasking graphical shell called "Lipstick" built with Qt by Jolla on top of the Wayland display server protocol.

It uses standard Linux middleware like Systemd, Pulseaudio and Qt. Glibc is the included C Library. The first Jolla Phone in 2013 used Btrfs for the filesystem, afterwards Ext4 has been used. RPM is used as a package manager with PackageKit and Zypper for dependency resolving.

For connectivity ConnMan is used to manage network connections. wpa_supplicant is used for wifi while Bluez is used for Bluetooth. oFono is used for telephone calls with VoLTE available only for the Sony Xperia 10 II and III and Jolla Phone (2026).

Positioning is provided for with GPS and geoclue/beaconDB.

For command-line access, Dash from BusyBox is installed by default, while Bash is also available. For remote access, SSH can be enabled in the settings, while root access is also possible.

For development, there is GCC, LLVM, Autotools, Make and Meson. Included languages are Python, Ruby, Perl and Rust. For Game development, SDL is available. The default IDE is Qt Creator.

Jolla uses free and open-source graphics device drivers while the Hybris library allows use of proprietary drivers for Android.

Theming is done with Ambiences, which support images, colors and optionally ringtones. The Gallery app can create an Ambience from a single image.

Some key components of Sailfish OS have been licensed proprietary by Jolla from the start and ever since (as of Sailfish OS 5.0 in February 2025). Since September 2025 some closed parts of Sailfish OS have been open sourced, with the announcement that more parts are to be followed.

Firejail (Sailjail) is used for security sandboxing of native applications since version 4.0.1 in 2021.

Sailfish OS can run some Android applications through a proprietary compatibility layer. It is running in an LXC container since Sailfish OS 3.0.1 from January 2019. Passthrough support for audio and bluetooth (since Sailfish 5.1 from 2026) is available.

=== Targeted device classes ===
Sailfish is targeted at mobile devices. Sailfish can be used as a complete general-purpose Linux OS on devices including in vehicle infotainment (IVI), navigation, smart TV, desktops and notebooks, yachts, automotive, e-commerce, home appliances, measuring and control equipment, smart building equipment, etc. See the Devices section for devices that run the Sailfish OS.

=== Sailfish OS SDK ===
The Sailfish OS SDK was announced at the Slush Helsinki conference in 2012, and the alpha was published in February 2013. The SDK, installation and coding tutorials are available for free download from the Documentation website despite the overall license not being open source.

Sailfish SDK uses Qt with the Qt Creator IDE for development. It uses Virtualbox for the build engine, while there is also emulation available. It's available for Linux, MacOS and Windows hosts (all 64bit). Docker can be used instead of Virtualbox, but is only available for a Linux host.

Targets for building are ARM in 64bit (aarch64) and 32bit (armv7hl) and Intel in 32bit (i486).

For hardware development there is a Platform SDK and a Hardware Adaptation Development Kit.

=== Application programming interfaces ===
Sailfish OS uses open source Qt APIs (Qt 5, QtQuick 2 etc.) and a proprietary Sailfish Silica for the UI. Standard Linux APIs are provided.

Sailfish Browser is the default web browser based on Gecko and using embedlite, a lite-weight embedding API from Mozilla. It's available under the MPL-2.0 license.

== Software overview ==
=== UI supported human languages ===
Officially Jolla declares supporting the following 14 languages for the user interface: Danish, German, English (UK), Spanish, French, Italian, Norwegian, Polish, Portuguese, Finnish, Swedish, Russian, Chinese (mainland), and Chinese (Hong Kong). For each of them, the OS has a dedicated keyboard. There are a few more languages which are unofficially supported by community freelancers not under control by Jolla, hence more than 20 languages are supported in total. Additional languages can be installed by skilled users due to the Linux architecture.

=== Public "Early access" for beta testers and developers ===
After positive experiences with pushing early updates to a small group of opt-in users for Sailfish Update 9 and for the connectivity hotfix, Jolla has allowed all interested parties to try a new version of Sailfish OS about 1–2 weeks before official release, in a program called "Early access". It is expected to be useful for developers and technically minded users, and a step towards more community integration into the Sailfish release process, including improvement of quality by identifying critical issues which only show up in certain environments or device setups, before rolling the update out to the wider user audience. As an added bonus, it provides a window for developers to test their applications on new releases of Sailfish OS.

Basic details about the early access update:

- The early release access is meant primarily for advanced users and developers.
- To sign up for the program there is a checkbox in the Jolla accounts profile page.
- Installed early-access release cannot be downgraded. The only way to downgrade from early access releases is to do a factory reset after removing the sign up check from the user's account profile.
- Early access releases should be considered "reasonably stable". Issues found during that period will either be fixed, or added to "known issues" on the release notes.
- Signing up for the early access releases will not void warranty.

=== Version history ===
Sailfish OS has three naming conventions: version number, update number and version name.

- Sailfish OS 1.0 versions were named after Finnish lakes.
- Sailfish OS 2.0 supports the Jolla Tablet with x86 platforms and featured a reworked touch based UI. Releases were named after Finnish rivers.
- Sailfish OS 3.0 and 4.0 features a slightly reworked UI. Releases are named after Finnish national parks.
- Sailfish OS 4.1, 4.2, 4.3, 4.4 and 4.5 features 64 bit support on the Sony Xperia 10 II, plus a new sharing system. Releases are named after Finnish Unesco world heritage sites.

Software version	Initial release date	Name
v0.99.5	13 November 2013	Haaganlampi (only for subscribed developers)
v0.99.6	11 November 2013	Idörpottarna (only for subscribed developers)
v1.0.0	16 November 2013	Kaajanlampi (initial public release)
v1.0.1	2 December 2013	Laadunjärvi ("Update 1")
v1.0.2	27 December 2013	Maadajärvi ("Update 2")
v1.0.3	27 January 2014	Naamankajärvi ("Update 3")
v1.0.4	11 March 2014	Ohijärvi ("Update 4")
v1.0.5	7 April 2014	Paarlampi ("Update 5")
v1.0.6	Not released	Raatejärvi ("Update 6"), was merged into v1.0.7
v1.0.7	3 June 2014	Saapunki ("Update 7")
v1.0.8	3 July 2014	Tahkalampi ("Update 8")
v1.1.0	16 September 2014	Uitukka ("Update 9"), was labelled as "opt-in upgrade"
v1.1.1	14 December 2014	Vaarainjärvi ("Update 10")
v1.1.2	1 February 2015	Yliaavanlampi ("Update 11")
v1.1.3	Not released	Åkanttrasket ("Update 12"), was merged into v1.1.4
v1.1.4	24 March 2015	Äijänpäivänjärvi ("Update 13")
v1.1.5	Not released	Österviken ("Update 14"), was dropped at release candidate stage
v1.1.6	27 May 2015	Aaslakkajärvi ("Update 15")
v1.1.7	24 June 2015	Björnträsket ("Update 16")
v1.1.9	18 August 2015	Eineheminlampi ("Update 17")
v2.0.0	19 October 2015	Saimaa ("Update 18")
v2.0.1	12 January 2016	Taalojärvi ("Update 19")
v2.0.2	13 May 2016	Aurajoki ("Update 20")
v2.0.3	6 July 2016	Espoonjoki ("Update 21"), OS version solely for the Turing Phone
v2.0.4	4 November 2016	Fiskarsinjoki ("Update 22")
v2.0.5	14 December 2016	Haapajoki ("Update 23")
v2.1.0	3 February 2017	Iijoki ("Update 24")
v2.1.1	15 May 2017	Jämsänjoki
v2.1.2	20 September 2017	Kiiminkijoki
v2.1.3	6 October 2017	Kymijoki
v2.1.4	12 February 2018	Lapuanjoki
v2.2.0	30 May 2018	Mouhijoki
v2.2.1	31 August 2018	Nurmonjoki
v3.0.0	29 October 2018	Lemmenjoki
v3.0.1	2 January 2019	Sipoonkorpi
v3.0.2	13 March 2019	Oulanka
v3.0.3	23 April 2019	Hossa
v3.1.0	15 July 2019	Seitseminen
v3.2.0	24 October 2019	Torronsuo
v3.2.1	5 December 2019	Nuuksio
v3.3.0	1 April 2020	Rokua
v3.4.0	22 September 2020	Pallas-Yllästunturi (the final release for the Jolla Phone)
v4.0.1	3 February 2021	Koli
v4.1.0	10 May 2021	Kvarken
v4.2.0	25 August 2021	Verla
v4.3.0	28 October 2021	Suomenlinna
v4.4.0	15 March 2022	Vanha Rauma
v4.5.0	2 February 2023	Struven Ketju
v4.6.0	20 May 2024	Sauna
v5.0.0	24 February 2025	Tampella
v5.1.0	16 June 2026	Pispala
v5.2.0	20 July 2026	Finlayson

=== Stop releases ===
When updating an installed Sailfish OS from an earlier release, for example after a device factory reset, there are several stop releases which must not be skipped and have to be installed before continuing on the path to subsequent releases. These releases provide new functionality that is not compatible with previous releases and have to be traversed in order not to put the Sailfish OS installation into an unstable state.

Software version	Release date	Name
v1.0.2.5	27 December 2013	Maadajärvi
v1.1.2.16	25 February 2015	Yliaavanlampi
v1.1.7.28	31 August 2015	Björnträsket
v1.1.9.30	22 October 2015	Eineheminlampi
v2.0.0.10	3 November 2015	Saimaa
v2.0.5.6	22 November 2016	Haapajoki (only a stop release for some devices, e.g., the Jolla C / Intex Aquafish)
v2.2.0.29	7 June 2018	Mouhijoki
v3.0.0.8	11 November 2018	Lemmenjoki
v3.2.0.12	5 November 2019	Torronsuo
v3.4.0.24	13 October 2020	Pallas-Yllästunturi
v4.0.1.48	16 February 2021	Koli
v4.1.0.24	27 May 2021	Kvarken
v4.2.0.21	16 September 2021	Verla
v4.3.0.15	16 February 2022	Suomenlinna
v4.4.0.72	30 September 2022	Vanha Rauma
v4.5.0.25	29 February 2024	Struven ketju
v4.6.0.15	20 September 2024	Sauna (the final release for Jolla Tablet, Jolla C, Xperia X, and Gemini PDA)
v5.0.0.71	30 October 2025	Tampella

=== App Stores ===
Jolla maintains an App Store at harbour.jolla.com. On a Sailfish device, there is an app for the Jolla Store for installing and updating packages. There is no web interface.

In addition, there is OpenRepos. This is an App Store maintained by the community that already existed at the time of Linux tablets and phones at Nokia. Besides a web interface, there is also the on-device app Storeman, with which apps can be installed and updated. Apps are uploaded as binary rpms, with source code often available on a source repository.

Since 2021 there is also Chum. It builds packages from source with the help of an OBS. For on-device installs and updates, there is the app Chum Gui.

=== Using Android software running on Sailfish OS ===
In addition to its native applications, Sailfish can run some Android applications by installing them from an application store or directly through an APK file. Supported Android version is 4.1.2 on the original Jolla phone while Android 4.4.4 is supported on the Jolla C, Jolla tablet and Xperia X. Android 13 is supported on the Xperia XA2, Xperia 10, Xperia 10 II, Xperia 10 III, Xperia 10 IV, Xperia 10 V, Jolla C2 and Jolla Phone (2026) since Sailfish 5.0.0.76.

Sailfish OS uses Alien Dalvik, a proprietary Android compatibility layer. It does not emulate Android, but instead implements its APIs by adapting the Android Open Source Project (AOSP) code to run as an application. Android applications can thus run at native speed without any perceivable slow-down. Sailfish can run both native Sailfish and Android software simultaneously, with the user switching between them on the fly.

Starting with Alien Dalvik 8.1 (also called "Android App Support" since then), it uses LXC to improve security by better isolation, in the same way the open source Android compatibility layer Anbox is doing.

== Hardware overview ==
Sailfish OS can be used on any hardware with Linux-kernel support and compatible with the middleware. Community enthusiasts have ported Sailfish OS to a number of devices this way.

=== Jolla devices ===
Jolla has created hardware specifically designed for use with Sailfish.

- Jolla Phone (2026) (available for order, delivery since July 2026).
- Jolla C2 Community Phone (2024) – Reference device designed for the Sailfish community. Delivery started 2024. The hardware was created in collaboration with Reeder.
- Jolla C Community Phone (2016) – Limited edition for the Sailfish OS community and developers. Announced in 2016. Not supported anymore.
- Jolla Tablet (2015) – Crowdfunding project that did not deliver.
- Jolla Phone (2013) – First Sailfish phone.

=== Third-party devices shipping with Sailfish OS ===
A small number of other vendors have officially licensed and shipped Sailfish OS for mobile equipment at the retail level.

- Commodore Callback 8020 (2026)
- INOI R7 and T8 (2017)
- Turing Phone (2016)
- Intex Aqua Fish (2016)

=== Devices with official aftermarket support (Sailfish X) ===
Jolla also sells an edition called Sailfish X to consumers as a license to manually flash Sailfish OS on officially supported devices. Jolla provides users with over-the-air updates and it includes proprietary add-ons like Android AppSupport and Microsoft Exchange.

- Sony Xperia 10 V
- Sony Xperia 10 IV
- Sony Xperia 10 III
- Sony Xperia 10 II
- Sony Xperia 10 Plus (32bit)
- Sony Xperia 10 (32bit)
- Sony Xperia XA2 Plus (32bit)
- Sony Xperia XA2 Ultra (32bit)
- Sony Xperia XA2 (32bit)
- Planet Computers Gemini PDA (no updates anymore)
- Sony Xperia X (no updates anymore)

=== Community enthusiasts' ports to devices from other vendors ===
Due to the relative ease of porting and the open source license, Sailfish OS has also been unofficially ported to other 3rd-party devices. The Hardware Adaptation Development Kit for porters has been published and is free. These ports are mostly published on the Maemo and XDA Developers forums, and in the Mer wiki a list of the ports is compiled. Due to license restrictions, proprietary parts or extensions such as the Alien Dalvik compatibility layer for Android apps are not included. However they can be added, e.g. when a manufacturer or distributor turns it from the community version into an officially supported version for a particular device. From the originally more than 80 ports, there are about 19 ports that are still in active development – as of March 2019 – meaning they have been updated to Sailfish 3:

- Alcatel Idol 3
- Fairphone 2
- F(x)tec Pro1
- HP TouchPad
- Motorola Moto Z Play
- Motorola Photon Q
- Motorola Moto X Force
- Motorola Moto X 2014
- Motorola Moto G 2014
- Motorola Moto G 2015
- Motorola Moto G4 Plus
- Nothing Phone 1
- OnePlus X
- OnePlus One
- OnePlus 3
- OnePlus 3T
- OnePlus 5
- OnePlus 5T
- OnePlus 6
- OnePlus 6T
- OnePlus 7T Pro
- PinePhone
- Samsung Galaxy A5 (2015)
- Siemens GigaSet GX290 – via ADB loader
- Sony Xperia X Compact
- Xiaomi Pad 6
- Xiaomi Redmi 2
- Xiaomi Redmi 4X
- Xiaomi Redmi 5 Plus
- Xiaomi Redmi Note 3
- Xiaomi Redmi Note 4
- Volla Phone/Volla Phone X

To display the ease of porting Sailfish OS to other devices, Jolla showed created ports and community ports at events like the Mobile World Congress, Slush and FOSDEM:

- Fairphone 2
- Google Nexus 4
- Google Nexus 5
- Google Nexus 7
- Jolla Sailfish Watch
- Nokia N950
- Nokia N9
- Samsung Galaxy S3
- TCL Idol X950
- Planet Computers Gemini PDA
- Sony Xperia X
- Sony Xperia XA2
- Xiaomi Mi 2
- a feature phone similar to the Nokia 3310 assumed to be the Chinese Kingsun EF33

== OS development status ==
Sailfish OS is promoted by Jolla and supported by the open Sailfish Alliance established in 2011, a group established to unite OEM and ODM manufacturers, chipset providers, operators, application developers and retailers. On 16 August 2012, the user interface was reported to be ready for release. Jolla's CEO Jussi Hurmola stated in a ZDNet interview, " ... Our UI is ready now, we haven't released it yet, we will save it for the product launch and the platform is getting up now so the project looks pretty nice".

The next day, Jolla's CEO Marc Dillon wrote on Twitter that the company had reached the first development target. Sailfish was debuted by the Jolla team, including a worldwide internet stream, as a demo of the OS, and the UI and SDK during the Slush event in Helsinki, Finland, on 21–22 November 2012. The alpha stage of Sailfish OS SDK was published at the end of February 2013 and was made available for free download.

On 16 September 2013, Jolla announced that its OS had been made compatible with Android applications and hardware. The first telephone to use it was launched on 27 November 2013 at a pop-up DNA Kauppa shop in Helsinki. The first 450 telephones were sold at this event, while the rest of the preordered devices were shipped shortly after.

In August 2015, version 1.1.9 "Eineheminlampi" was released, which added the main elements of the revamped Sailfish OS 2.0 user interface.

Sailfish OS 2.0.0 was launched with the Jolla Tablet, and existing devices, both smartphones and tablets, from Jolla's official distribution channels are supported with upgrade to Sailfish OS 2.0.0 and following updates.

In May 2016 Jolla announced the Sailfish Community Device Program, supporting developers and members of Sailfish OS community.

== Aurora OS ==
Jolla staff met with members of the Russian technology community to break ground on the new software and promote Sailfish OS, as part of Jolla's BRICS strategy. As a result of those efforts, on 18 May 2015 the Russian minister of communications Nikolai Nikiforov announced plans to replace Apple's iOS and Google's Android platforms with new software based on Sailfish. He intends it to cover 50% of Russian needs in this area during next ten years, in comparison to the 95% currently covered with western technology. The Russian version is currently being developed under the brand name Mobile OS "Aurora" (мобильная ОС «Аврора»), before 2019 as "Sailfish Mobile OS RUS". The Chinese multinational technology company Huawei was in talks with the Russian Ministry of Communications to install Aurora OS on tablets for Russia's population census by August 2020. Jolla has cut business ties with Russia in 2022.

== Sailfish Alliance ==
Sailfish Alliance was the open alliance established in 2011 by Jolla company to support the MeeGo ecosystem with new products, services and business opportunities around or using Sailfish OS.

The alliance was seen as a competitor to other groups like Android's Open Handset Alliance.

The aim of the Alliance was to offer unique differentiation opportunities and sustainable competitive advantage for OEM and ODM manufacturers, chipset providers, operators, application developers, retailers and other interested in sides.

== Sailfish Secure ==
Sailfish Secure was announced in 2015 as an open and secure mobile phone platform, based on Sailfish OS. It was introduced publicly in Barcelona, Spain at the Mobile World Congress on 2 March 2015 where plans for Sailfish Secure were presented.

It was based on a security-hardened version of Sailfish OS 2.0 and SSH's communication encryption and key management platform. It was developed by Jolla (the Sailfish OS designer and developer) together with SSH Communications Security (the inventor of Secure Shell SSH protocol).

== See also ==
- Comparison of mobile operating systems
- HarmonyOS
- KaiOS
- Nokia Asha platform
- Nokia X platform
