= Nokia N950 =

2011 MeeGo smartphone

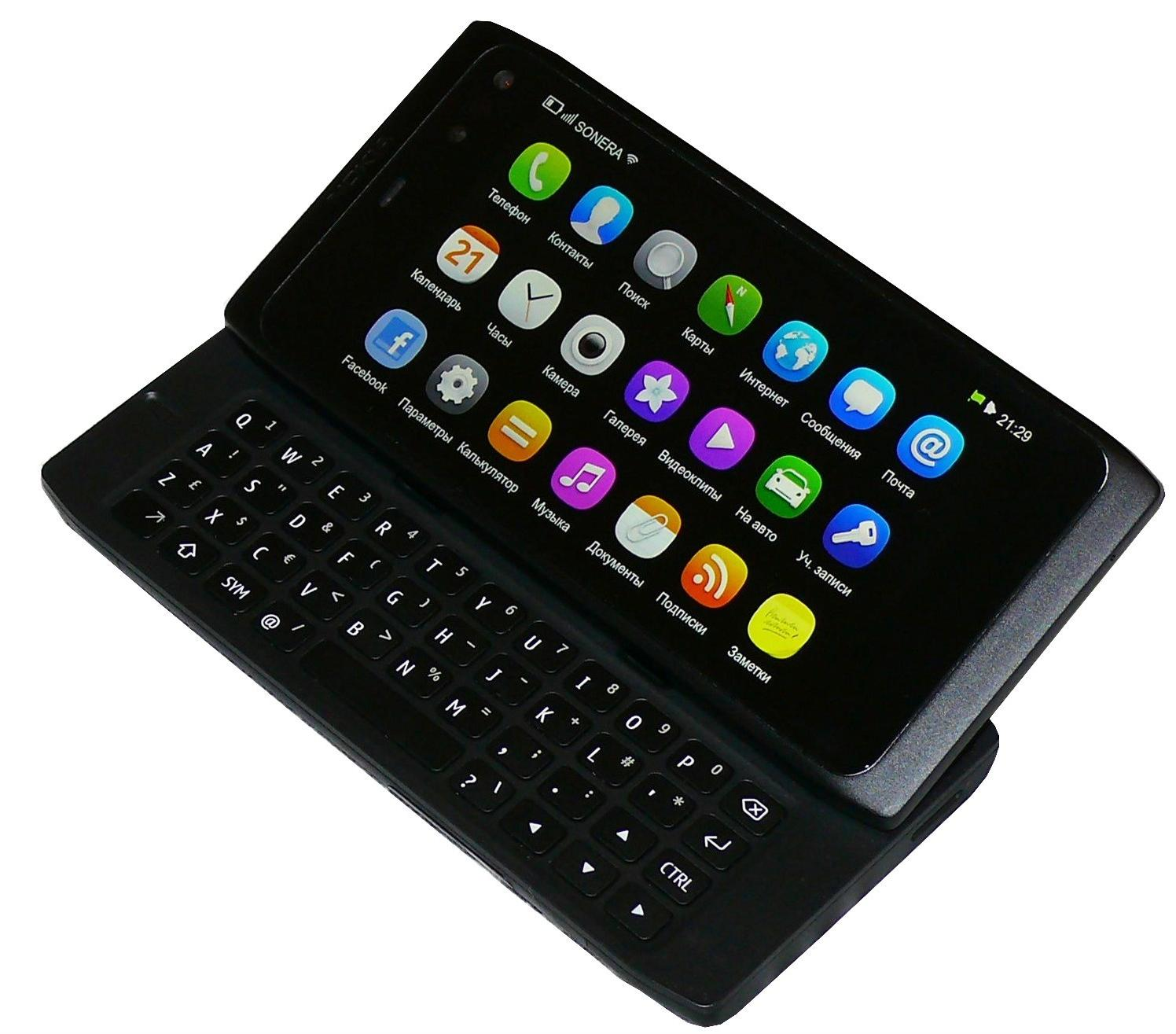
- Nokia N950 phone running MeeGo Harmattan 1.2
- Manufacturer: Nokia
- Series: Nseries
- Availability by region: Never released
- Predecessor: Nokia N900
- Compatible networks: GSM 850 / 900 / 1800 / 1900; GPRS/EDGE class B, multislot class 33; UMTS 850 / 900 / 1700/2100 / 1900 / 2100
- Operating system: MeeGo 1.2 "Harmattan"
- CPU: 1 GHz ARM Cortex-A8 SoC processor; TI OMAP3630; 3D Graphics PowerVR SGX530 GPU; 430 MHz TI TMS320C64x Digital signal processor
- Memory: 1 GB Mobile DDR
- Storage: 16 GB eMMC
- Removable storage: none
- Battery: BL-4D (1200 mAh) or BV-4D (1400 mAh) Li-Ion battery (removable by unscrewing a back cover); micro-USB charging
- Rear camera: 12-megapixel, 720p at 30 FPS, Digital zoom 4× for camera and video
- Front camera: VGA
- Display: TFT LCD 854×480 px (FWVGA), 4.0 in (100 mm), 16.7 million colors (24-bit)
- Connectivity: WLAN IEEE 802.11 a/b/g/n (2.4 and 5 GHz); Bluetooth 2.1 +EDR; micro-USB 2.0; GPS and A-GPS; 3.5 mm AV connector (audio in/out, video in/out, TV-set out); Digital Living Network Alliance (DLNA); mini-SIM card; FM receiver
- Data inputs: Capacitive multi-touch display; Physical slide-out QWERTY keyboard; External functional hardware keys; Accelerometer (3-axis); Magnetometer (3-axis); Proximity sensor; Ambient light detector; Stereo microphone + 2nd microphone for active noise cancellation
- Development status: Released in limited edition

The Nokia N950 is a developers-only smartphone aimed toward Linux-based MeeGo OS and Nokia N9 developers. About 5,000 units were produced and sent to developers throughout July 2011. Nokia exclusively distributed the device to developers as it was not offered for sale to the public.

The phone exists in several variations. The final device issued to developers is black with 1 GB of main memory and 16 GB eMMC internal storage, whilst some prototypes, known by the model number N9-00 (not to be confused with the N9-01) are silver with 512 MB main memory and 64 GB eMMC. Although they are marked "NOT FOR SALE", some were sold on eBay for more than €2,000.

The device received an unofficial Android port from the NITDroid community and also a port of NemoMobile and Firefox OS.

== Hardware specifications ==
The Nokia N950 phone uses the same hardware components as the Nokia N9 phone with the following exceptions:

- N950 is physically larger and is made out of aluminum, whereas the Nokia N9 has a polycarbonate unibody.
- N950 has a physical slide-out QWERTY keyboard. The Nokia N9 is a touchscreen-only device.
- N950 has partial support for landscape mode. The Nokia N9 was mostly used in portrait mode at the beginning, but this was changed after N9 display keyboard improvements with MeeGo Harmattan updates.
- N950 has a 4.0 in (100 mm) TFT LCD whereas the Nokia N9 has a 3.9 in (99 mm) AMOLED display. Display resolution and aspect ratio are the same on both devices (854×480).
- The N950's physical camera module is different from the Nokia N9. Both camera modules have similar image quality (Carl Zeiss branding in the Nokia N9) and both modules support 8 Mpix image mode.
- In the N950, the front-facing camera is in the top right corner, while on the Nokia N9 it is in the bottom right corner. The actual camera module is the same.
- N950 does not have support for Near Field Communication (NFC)
- The Nokia N9 has a slightly more sensitive magnetometer and ambient light sensor (ALS)
- N950 has a 1320 mAh battery, Nokia N9 has a 1450 mAh battery
- The Nokia N9's MeeGo Harmattan software can be updated over-the-air (OTA), this feature is not available in the N950 as it is a MeeGo developers' phone.

== Development tools ==
Nokia N950 developers can use tools from Nokia including the Qt SDK, or Harmattan Python for software development.
