= MeeGo =

Linux distribution

MeeGo OS

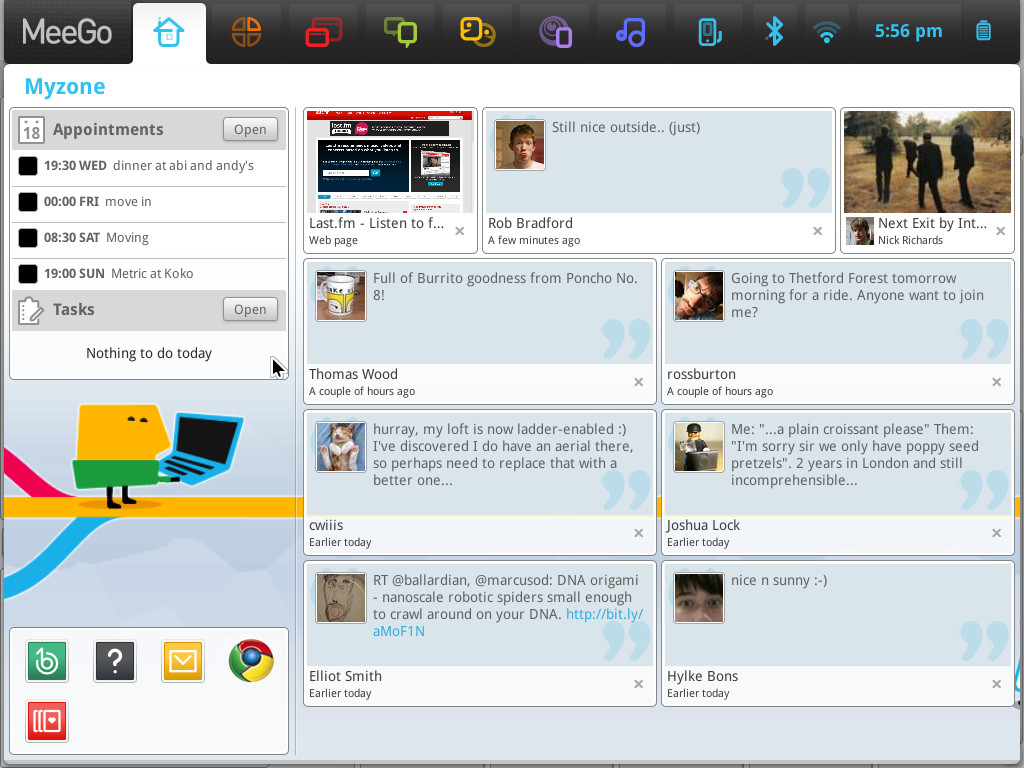
- MeeGo's netbook user interface
- Developer: Nokia, Intel, Linux Foundation
- OS family: Linux (Unix-like)
- Working state: Terminated in favor of Tizen. Forked to create Mer.
- Source model: Open source
- Initial release: 26 May 2010; 16 years ago
- Latest release: 1.2.0.10 / 12 July 2012; 14 years ago
- Marketing target: Mobile
- Package manager: RPM Package Manager
- Supported platforms: ARM and x86
- Kernel type: Monolithic (Linux kernel)
- Userland: GNU
- Default user interface: Several GUIs, see below
- License: Various, see below
- Official website: meego.com at the Wayback Machine (archived 5 October 2012)

Support status
- Unsupported

MeeGo is a discontinued Linux distribution hosted by the Linux Foundation, using source code from the operating systems Moblin (produced by Intel) and Maemo (produced by Nokia). MeeGo was primarily targeted at mobile devices and information appliances in the consumer electronics market. It was designed to act as an operating system for hardware platforms such as netbooks, entry-level desktops, nettops, tablet computers, mobile computing and communications devices, in-vehicle infotainment devices, SmartTV / ConnectedTV, IPTV-boxes, smart phones, and other embedded systems.

Nokia wanted to make MeeGo its primary smartphone operating system in 2010, but after a change in direction it was stopped in February 2011, leaving Intel alone in the project. The Linux Foundation canceled MeeGo in September 2011 in favor of Tizen, which Intel then joined in collaboration with Samsung. A community-driven successor called Mer was formed that year. A Finnish start-up, Jolla, picked up Mer to develop a new operating system: Sailfish OS, and launched the Jolla Phone smartphone at the end of 2013. Another Mer derivative called Nemo Mobile was also developed.

MeeGo was intended to run on a variety of hardware platforms including hand-helds, in-car devices, netbooks and televisions. All platforms shared the MeeGo core, with different "User Experience" ("UX") layers for each type of device. MeeGo was designed by combining the best of both Intel's Fedora-based Moblin and Nokia's Debian-based Maemo. When it was first announced, the then President and CEO of Nokia, Olli-Pekka Kallasvuo, said that MeeGo would create an ecosystem, which would be the best among other operating systems and would represent players from different countries.

== History ==
MeeGo T01 was first announced at Mobile World Congress in February 2010 by Intel and Nokia in a joint press conference. The stated aim is to merge the efforts of Intel's Moblin and Nokia's Maemo former projects into one new common project that would drive a broad third party application ecosystem. According to Intel, MeeGo was developed because Microsoft did not offer comprehensive Windows 7 support for the Atom processor. On 16 February 2010 a tech talk notice was posted about the former Maemo development project founded in 2009 and code named Harmattan, that originally slated to become Maemo 6. Those notice stated that Harmattan is now considered to be a MeeGo instance (though not a MeeGo product), and Nokia is giving up the Maemo branding for Harmattan on the Nokia N9 and beyond. (Any previous Maemo versions up to Maemo 5, a.k.a. Fremantle, will still be referred to as Maemo.) In addition it was made clear that only the naming was given up whilst development on Harmattan would continue so that any schedules would have been met.

Aminocom and Novell also played a large part in the MeeGo effort, working with the Linux Foundation on their build infrastructure and official MeeGo products. Amino was responsible for extending MeeGo to TV devices, while Novell was increasingly introducing technology that was originally developed for openSUSE, (including Open Build Service, ZYpp for package management, and other system management tools). In November 2010, AMD also joined the alliance of companies that were actively developing MeeGo.

Quite noticeable changes in the project setup happened on 11 February 2011 when Nokia officially announced to switch over to Windows Phone 7 and thus abandoning MeeGo and the partnership. Nokia CEO Stephen Elop said in an interview with Engadget: "What we’re doing is not thinking of MeeGo as the Plan B. We’re thinking about MeeGo and related development work as what’s the next generation." Nokia did eventually release one MeeGo smartphone that year running "Harmattan", the Nokia N9.

On 27 September 2011, it was announced by Intel employee Imad Sousou that in collaboration with Samsung Solstice, MeeGo will be replaced by Tizen during 2012.

Community developers from the Mer project, however, started to continue MeeGo without Intel and Nokia. At a later time some of the former MeeGo developers from Nokia headed for founding the company Jolla that after some time popped up with a MeeGo and its free successor Mer-based OS platform they called Sailfish OS.

== System requirements ==
MeeGo provided support for both ARM and Intel x86 processors with SSSE3 enabled and used btrfs as the default file system.

== User interfaces ==
Within the MeeGo project there are several graphical user interfaces – internally called User Experiences ("UX").

=== Netbook ===
The Netbook UX is a continuation of the Moblin interface. It is written using the Clutter-based Mx toolkit, and uses the Mutter window manager.

Samsung Netbook NP-N100 use MeeGo for its operating system.

MeeGo's netbook version uses several Linux applications in the background, such as Evolution (Email, calendar), Empathy (instant messaging), Gwibber (microblogging), Chromium (web browser), and Banshee (multimedia player), all integrated into the graphical user interface.

=== Handset ===
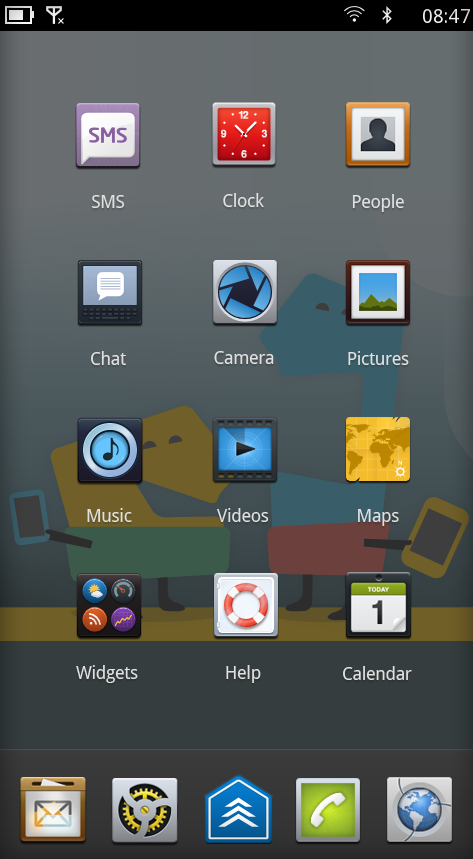
Handset UX from MeeGo 1.1 "Day 1"

The Handset UX is based on Qt, with GTK+ and Clutter included to provide compatibility for Moblin applications. To support the hundreds of Hildon-based Maemo applications, users have to install the Hildon library ported by the maemo.org community. Depending on the device, applications will be provided from either the Intel AppUp or the Nokia Ovi digital software distribution systems.

The MeeGo Handset UX's "Day 1" prerelease was on 30 June 2010. The preview was initially available for the Aava Mobile Intel Moorestown platform, and a 'kickstart' file provided for developers to build an image for the Nokia N900.

=== Smartphone ===
MeeGo OS v1.2 "Harmattan" is used in Nokia N9 and N950 phones.

=== Tablet ===
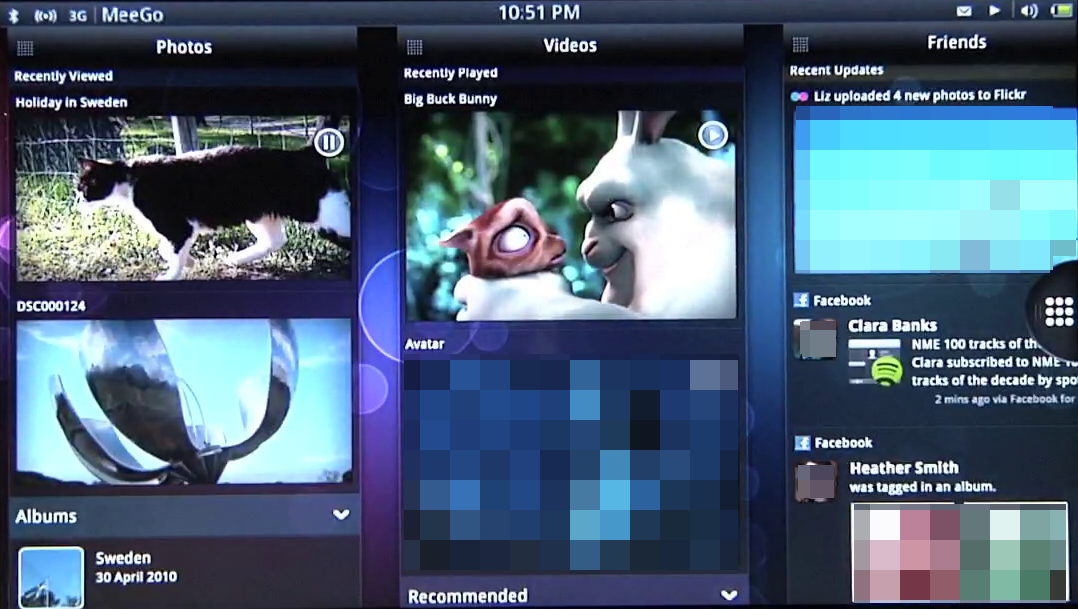
MeeGo's Tablet UX as a pre-alpha version

Intel demonstrated the Tablet UX on a Moorestown-based tablet PC at COMPUTEX Taipei in early June 2010.

Since then, some information appeared on MeeGo website indicating there will be a Tablet UX part of the MeeGo project, but it is not known if this UX will be the one demonstrated by Intel. This Tablet UX will be fully free like the rest of the MeeGo project and will be coded with Qt and the MeeGo Touch Framework. Intel has revealed interest in combining Qt with Wayland instead of X11 in MeeGo Touch to use the latest graphics technologies supported by Linux kernel, which should improve user experiences and reduce system complexity.

Minimum hardware requirements are currently unknown.

The WeTab runs MeeGo T01 with a custom user interface and was made available in September 2010.

=== In-Vehicle infotainment ===
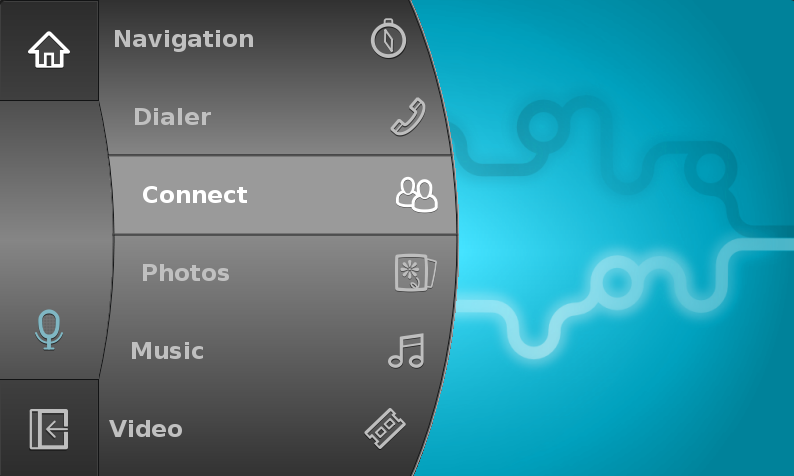
MeeGo's IVI UX as shipped with MeeGo 1.1

The GENIVI Alliance, a consortium of several car makers and their industry partners, uses Moblin with Qt as base for its 'GENIVI 1.0 Reference Platform' for In-Vehicle Infotainment (IVI) and automotive navigation system as a uniformed mobile computing platform. Graham Smethurst of GENIVI Alliance and BMW Group announced in April 2010 the switch from Moblin to MeeGo.

=== Smart TV ===
Intel planned to develop a version of MeeGo for IPTV set top boxes, but had since cancelled.

== Licensing ==
The MeeGo framework consists of a wide variety of original and upstream components, all of which are licensed under licenses certified by the Free Initiative (such as the GNU General Public License). To allow hardware vendors to personalize their device's user experiences, the project's license policy requires that MeeGo's reference User Experience subsystems be licensed under a Permissive free software license – except for libraries that extend MeeGo API's (which were licensed under the GNU Lesser General Public License to help discourage fragmentation), or applications (which can be licensed separately).

== Technical foundations ==
The MeeGo Core integrates elements of two other Linux distributions: Maemo (a distribution which Nokia derived from Debian) and Moblin (which Intel derived from Fedora).

MeeGo uses RPM software repositories. It is one of the first Linux distributions to deploy Btrfs as the default file system.

Although most of the software in MeeGo's Jolla interface use the Qt widget toolkit, it also supports GTK+. The final revision of MeeGo Qt v4.7, Qt Mobility v1.0, OpenGL ES v2.0. MeeGo also supports the Accounts & SSO, Maliit, oFono software frameworks.

MeeGo compiles software with the openSUSE Build Service.

== Derivatives ==
MeeGo and its related mobile operating systems

Predecessors and siblings of Tizen

As with Moblin before, MeeGo also serves as a technology pool from which software vendors can derive new products.

=== MeeGo/Harmattan ===
Even though MeeGo was initiated as collaboration between Nokia and Intel, the collaboration was formed when Nokia was already developing the next incarnation of its Maemo Linux distribution. As a result, the Maemo 6 base operating system was kept intact while the Handset UX was shared, with the name changed to "MeeGo/Harmattan".

On 21 June 2011, Nokia announced its first MeeGo/Harmattan smartphone device, Nokia N9.

=== Mer ===
The original Mer project was a free re-implementation of Maemo, ported to the Nokia Internet Tablet N800. When MeeGo first appeared this work was discontinued and the development effort went to MeeGo.

After both Nokia and then Intel abandoned MeeGo, the Mer project was revived and continued to develop the MeeGo codebase and tools. It is now being developed in the open by a meritocratic community. Mer provides a Core capable of running various UXs developed by various other projects, and will include maintained application development APIs, such as Qt, EFL, and HTML5/WAC.

Some of the former MeeGo user interface were already ported to run on top of Mer, such as the handset reference UX, now called Nemo Mobile. There are also a couple of new tablet UXes available, such as Cordia and Plasma Active. Mer is considered to be the legitimate successor of Meego, as the other follow-up project Tizen (see below) changed the APIs fundamentally.

==== Nemo Mobile ====
Nemo Mobile is a community driven operating system incorporating Mer targeted at mobile phones and tablet.

==== Sailfish OS ====
Sailfish OS is an operating system developed by the Finnish startup Jolla. It also incorporates Mer. After Nokia abandoned their participation in the MeeGo project, the directors and core professionals from Nokia's N9 team left the company and together formed Jolla, to bring MeeGo back into the market mainstream. This effort eventually resulted in the creation of the Sailfish OS. The Sailfish OS and the Sailfish OS SDK are based on the core and the tools of the Mer core distribution, which is a revival of the core of the MeeGo project (a meritocracy-governed and managed successor of the MeeGo OS, but without its own user interface and system kernel). Sailfish includes a multi-tasking user interface that Jolla intends to use to differentiate its smartphones from others and as a competitive advantage against devices that run Google's Android or Apple's iOS. Among other things, the Sailfish OS is characterised by:

- can be used with a wide range of devices in the same way as MeeGo
- Jolla continues to use the MeeGo APIs (via Mer), which consists of:
  - Qt 4.7 [Qt47]
  - Qt Mobility 1.0 [QtMob]
  - OpenGL ES 2.0 [OGLES]
  - updated version, like Qt 5.0 are or will be used in/via Mer core;
- an in-house Jolla GUI (successor of swipe UI) for smartphone devices;
- uses QML, Qt and HTML5;
- thanks to Mer, the core can run on various hardware like Intel, ARM and any other which has a kernel able to work with the Mer core;
- open source, except for some of Jolla's UI elements. Those interested in further development can become involved through the Mer project or the Sailfish Alliance or Jolla;
- Jolla, i.e. the Sailfish team, is an active contributor to the Mer project

=== Tizen ===
Although Tizen was initially announced as a continuation of the MeeGo effort, there is little shared effort and architecture between these projects, since Tizen inherited much more from Samsung's LiMo than from MeeGo. As most of the Tizen work is happening behind closed doors and is done by Intel and Samsung engineers, the people involved in the former MeeGo open source project continued their work under Mer and projects associated with it. Because Tizen does not use the Qt framework, which is the core part of Meego's API (see above), Tizen cannot technically be considered to be a derivative of MeeGo.

=== SUSE and Smeegol Linux ===
On 1 June 2010, Novell announced that they would ship a SUSE Linux incarnation with MeeGo's Netbook UX (MeeGo User Experience) graphical user interface.

A MeeGo-based Linux distribution with this user interface is already available from openSUSE's Goblin Team under the name Smeegol Linux, this project combines MeeGo with openSUSE to get a new netbook-designed Linux distribution. What makes Smeegol Linux unique when compared to the upstream MeeGo or openSUSE is that this distribution is at its core based on openSUSE but has the MeeGo User Experience as well as a few other changes such as adding the Mono-based Banshee media player, NetworkManager-powered network configuration, a newer version of Evolution Express, and more. Any end-users can also build their own customized Smeegol Linux OS using SUSE Studio.

=== Fedora ===
Fedora 14 contains a selection of software from the MeeGo project.

=== Linpus ===
Linpus Technologies is working on bringing their services on top of MeeGo Netbook and MeeGo Tablet.

=== Splashtop ===
The latest version of the instant-on OS Splashtop-platform (by Splashtop Inc. which was previously named DeviceVM Inc.) is compliant with MeeGo, and future version of Splashtop will be based on MeeGo and will be available for commercial use in the first half of 2011.

== Release schedule ==
It was announced at the Intel Developer Forum 2010 that MeeGo would follow a six-month release schedule. Version 1.0 for Atom netbooks and a code drop for the Nokia N900 became available for download as of Wednesday, 26 May 2010.

Version	Kernel version	Release date	Notes	Devices supported (netbooks)	Devices supported (handsets)	Codename
1.0	2.6.33	26 May 2010	Primarily a Netbook release; only a code drop was released for mobile devices (the Nokia N900).	Asus EeePC 901, 1000H, 1001P, 1005HA, 1005PE, 1008HA, X101, Eeetop ET1602, Dell mini10v, Inspiron Mini 1012, Acer Aspire One D250, AO532-21S, Revo GN40, Aspire 5740–6025, Lenovo S10, MSI U100, U130, AE1900, HP mini 210–1044, Toshiba NB302.	Nokia N900 (No handset UX)	Arlington
1.0.1	2.6.33.5	July 2010	Update to MeeGo 1.0; Kernel updated to 2.6.33.5, USB device loading time improved, improved 3D performance, browser enhancements, resolved multiple e-mail client issue, enhanced netbook window manager, improved visuals, full support for GNOME proxy configuration in the media player, more control over DNS settings.	All Netbooks supported by MeeGo 1.0; see above.	None	Boston
1.0.2	2.6.33.5	9 August 2010	Update to MeeGo 1.0; X-Server Update, Connection Manager Update, Package Manager UI Update, Perl Update and several more.	All Netbooks supported by MeeGo 1.0; see above.	None	Cupertino
1.0.3	2.6.33.5	10 September 2010	Update to MeeGo 1.0; several Updates, e.g. Chromium browser, Connection Manager	All Netbooks supported by MeeGo 1.0; see above.	None	Dallas
1.0.4	2.6.33.5	12 October 2010	Update to MeeGo 1.0; several security updates, better support for Lenovo S10-3, ...	All Netbooks supported by MeeGo 1.0; see above.	None	Emeryville
1.0.5	Unknown	28 November 2010	MeeGo core update.	All Netbooks supported by MeeGo 1.0; see above.	None	Fairbanks
1.0.6	Unknown	4 January 2011	MeeGo core update.	All Netbooks supported by MeeGo 1.0; see above.	None	Georgetown
1.0.7	Unknown	24 February 2011	MeeGo Netbook software update.	All Netbooks supported by MeeGo 1.0; see above.	None	Honolulu
1.1	2.6.35	28 October 2010	Touch-based devices support proposed with the Handset UX	Unknown	Aava and Nokia N900	Irvine
1.1.1	2.6.35	28 November 2010	Several Fixes and Updates	Unknown	Aava and Nokia N900	Jefferson
1.1.2	2.6.35	7 January 2011	Several security issues fixed, update syncevolution and connman	Unknown		Knoxville
1.1.3	2.6.35	24 February 2011	Fixed many important security issues, enabled all programs to access remote files over network and updated translation	Unknown		Lakeside
1.1.99	2.6.35	24 February 2011	Beta testing of MeeGo 1.2 for Nokia N900 and other handsets.	Unknown		Mallard
1.2	2.6.37	19 May 2011		Unknown	Nokia N950 (developers only) and Nokia N9	Newark
1.3	2.6.37	October 2011 (canceled)		Unknown	Nokia N950 (developers only) and Nokia N9	Otsego

== Launch ==
In February 2011, Nokia announced a partnership with Microsoft for mobile handsets and the departure of Nokia's MeeGo team manager Alberto Torres, leading to speculation as to Nokia's future participation in MeeGo development or using Windows Phone by Nokia.

In September 2011, Nokia began shipping the first MeeGo smartphone Nokia N9, ahead of the Windows Phone 7 launch expected later this year. The first MeeGo-based tablet WeTab was launched in 2010 by Neofonie.

In early July 2012, Nokia's Meego development lead Sotiris Makrygiannis and other team members left Nokia.

== Companies supporting the project ==
Company	Industry	Targeted device	Support method
Acer	Computer systems, hardware	Tablets, notebooks	Iconia M500 tablet to run MeeGo
AMD	Computer systems, hardware	Laptops, PCs	To contribute engineering resources to the free MeeGo project
Asus	Computer systems, hardware	Laptop	The Asus Eee PC X101 will have a MeeGo operating system option
Asianux	Software	Tablet	The MeeGo version of the Midinux 3.0 tablet is based on Asianux Linux
Collabora	Software	None	Provide consulting for MeeGo
DeviceVM	Computer, software	PC	Uses MeeGo for Splash Top PCs
EA Mobile	Gaming	Tablets, smartphones	Supports MeeGo rhetorically, declared intent to use it for future mobile games
Gameloft	Gaming	Tablets, smartphones	Supports MeeGo rhetorically, declared intent to use it for future mobile games
GENIVI Alliance	Automobile	IVI	Standardized on MeeGo for auto infotainment (IVI) system.
General Motors (GM)	Automobile	IVI	Member of GENIVI Alliance that standardized on MeeGo for Automobile Infotainment Systems (IVI)
Hancom	Computer software	PC, laptop	Plans to spread MeeGo to the Korean market
Igalia	Software consulting	From mobile devices to desktop	Develops MeeGo, sponsored MeeGo at Dublin 2010 conference
Integrated Computer Solutions	Software consulting	Embedded, mobile devices	Develops custom software for MeeGo device suppliers.
Intel	Semiconductors	Smartphones	Core sponsor and developer of MeeGo
Jaguar Land Rover	Automobile	IVI	Plans to use MeeGo for their new car infotainment
Lanedo	Software consulting	Embedded devices to desktops	Software development of MeeGo, sponsored MeeGo at San Francisco 2011 conference
Linaro	Software	Mobile devices	Optimises MeeGo for high performance on ARM
Linpus	Software OS	Laptops, netbooks	Created the Linpus Lite Computer with a MeeGo OS
Mandriva	Software industry	PC, laptops	Their minis to run on MeeGo
Metasys	Computer, software	Laptop PC	Uses a MeeGo based operating system
Nokia	Telecommunications, computer software	Smartphones	Made two MeeGo handsets, N9 and N950; abandoned MeeGo development in 2011 for Microsoft Windows Phone
PSA Peugeot Citroen	Automobile maker	IVI	Plans to use MeeGo for their new car infotainment
Red Flag Linux	Linux OS	Tablet, IVI	Plans to incorporate parts of MeeGo (the UI) into their Linux distribution
Solstice	Platform	Smartphones	Collaboration with Intel
ST-Ericsson	Wireless semiconductor	Smartphones	The U8500 Platform will include MeeGo
Tencent	Online service provider	Smartphones	Plans to work on next generation mobile devices and apps, using MeeGo
Turbolinux	Linux OS	Smartphones	Supports MeeGo rhetorically
Wind River Systems	Mobile software	Smartphones	Owned by Intel, plans to port MeeGo to other platforms

== See also ==
- Comparison of mobile operating systems
- Nokia X platform – the next Linux project by Nokia
- KaiOS
- Hongmeng OS
