= Gemini PDA =

Personal digital assistant released in 2018

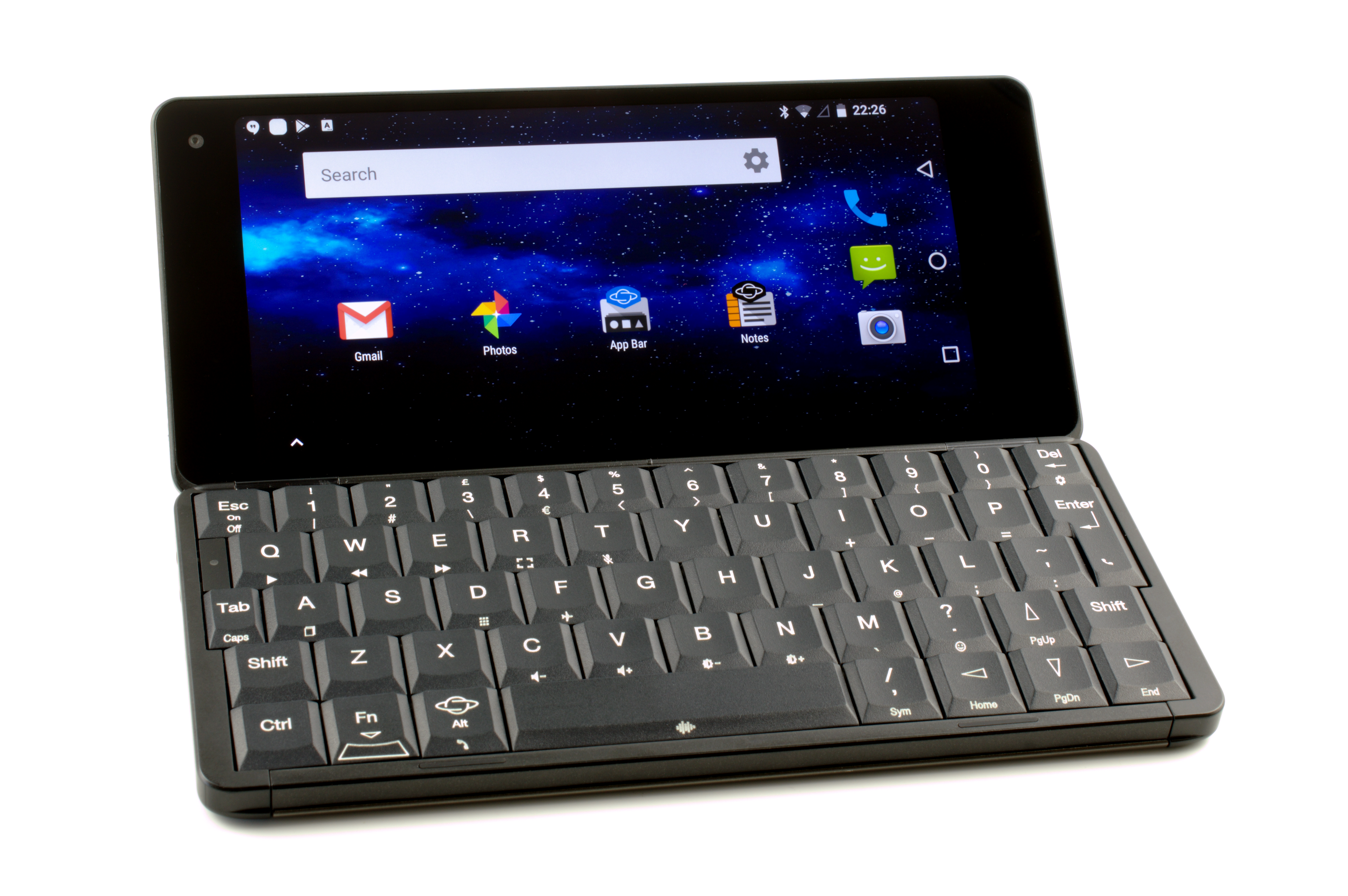
- Manufacturer: Planet Computers
- Type: Subnotebook personal digital assistant smartphone
- First released: 2018; 8 years ago
- Predecessor: Psion Series 5, Psion Series 7
- Successor: Cosmo Communicator, Astro Slide 5G Transformer
- Compatible networks: GSM/GPRS/EDGE 850/900/1800/1900; CDMA 850/1900 MHz BC0 BC1+ EVDO; WCDMA 900/2100 MHz; LTE 1/2/3/4/5/7/12/17/20/41
- Form factor: Wide clamshell design, with physical keyboard
- Dimensions: 15.1 mm (0.59 in) H 171.4 mm (6.75 in) W 79.3 mm (3.12 in) D
- Weight: 320 g (11 oz)
- Operating system: Android 7.1 "Nougat"; Debian Linux; Sailfish OS
- System-on-chip: Mediatek MT6797X Helio X27
- CPU: 10×ARM Cortex-A: 2×A72 @2.6GHz 4×A53 @2.0GHz 4×A53 @1.6GHz
- GPU: Quad Core ARM Mali (GPU) T880 MP4 @875MHz
- Memory: 4 GB LPDDR3 RAM
- Storage: 64 GB
- Removable storage: microSDXC
- Battery: 4,220 mAh
- Rear camera: 5 MP (optional)
- Front camera: 5 MP
- Display: 5.99 in (152 mm) 2160×1080, 403 dpi
- External display: HDMI via right-hand USB port
- Sound: Stereo speakers; 3.5mm stereo audio jack
- Connectivity: 2×USB-C OTG; Bluetooth v4.1; Wi-Fi 802.11a/b/g/n/ac
- Data inputs: Computer keyboard; Multi-touch, capacitive touchscreen; Voice user interface; GPS; Push button
- Website: www.planetcom.co.uk

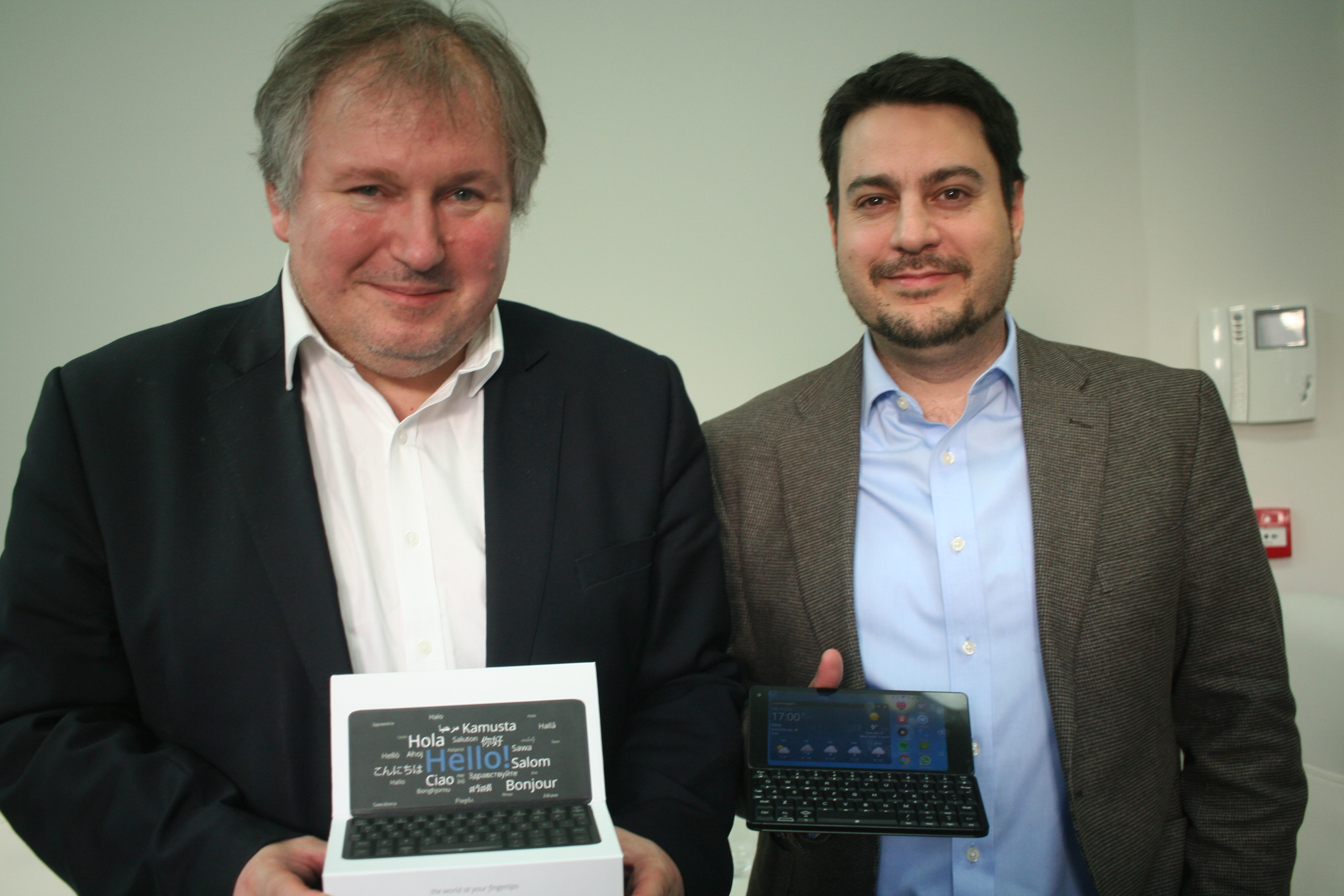
Box and Gemini PDA with Planet Computers' Janko Mrsic-Flogel (CEO, left) and Davide Guidi (CTO, right)

The Gemini PDA is a personal digital assistant designed by Planet Computers in association with Martin Riddiford, who formerly worked on the Psion Series 5 in the 1990s, and crowdfunded via Indiegogo in 2017. The Gemini bucks the trend of modern smartphones in its screen being primarily used in landscape aspect, and having a keyboard, i.e. taking on the form of a subnotebook.

Planet supports running two operating systems on the device, and it dual-boots between Android and Linux. Other possibilities include Sailfish OS.

Before January 2018, preproduction devices were made available to reviewers, and mass production began in December 2017, with devices starting to be despatched to Indiegogo backers in late January 2018.

== Hardware ==
- CPU/GPU system on a chip is a MediaTek Deca Core Helio, either the X25 or X27 chipset.
  - 2x Cortex A72 @ 2.6 GHz
  - 4x Cortex A53 @ 2.0 GHz
  - 4x Cortex A53 @ 1.6 GHz
  - ARM Mali T880 MP4 @ 875 MHz
- RAM: 4 GB
- Flash: 64 GB
- microSDHC card slot
- Two USB-C connectors, only one of which can be used to charge it. Video out is possible with a proprietary HDMI adaptor, and not the standardised USB-C alternate mode.
- Display: 5.99" LCD, 2160×1080 (403 ppi, 2:1 aspect ratio)
- Mass: 320g
- Dimensions (mm): 171.4(W) × 79.3(D) × 15.1(H)
- Bluetooth: 4.1
- Wi-Fi: 802.11a/b/g/n/ac
- Radio bands (4G variant):
  - GSM 850/900/1800/1900 MHz
  - CDMA 850/1900 MHz BC0 BC1+ EVDO
  - UMTS 900/2100 MHz
  - LTE 1/2/3/4/5/7/12/17/20/41 (with VoLTE)
- MicroSIM slot and eSIM (4G variant)
- Battery: 4220 mAh
- Front camera 5 MP
- GPS: with AGPS
- Sensors: Accelerometer, light sensor, gyro, magnetic sensor
- Audio:
  - stereo speakers
  - 3.5mm headphone jack
  - dual microphones

Some early devices were made with the X25 SoC as specified in the Indiegogo campaign, with the factory switching to X27 as X25 stock was depleted. They also have the eSIM feature disabled.

Two variants are sold: one with Wi-Fi only, and one with Wi-Fi and a mobile phone radio.

== Optional accessories ==
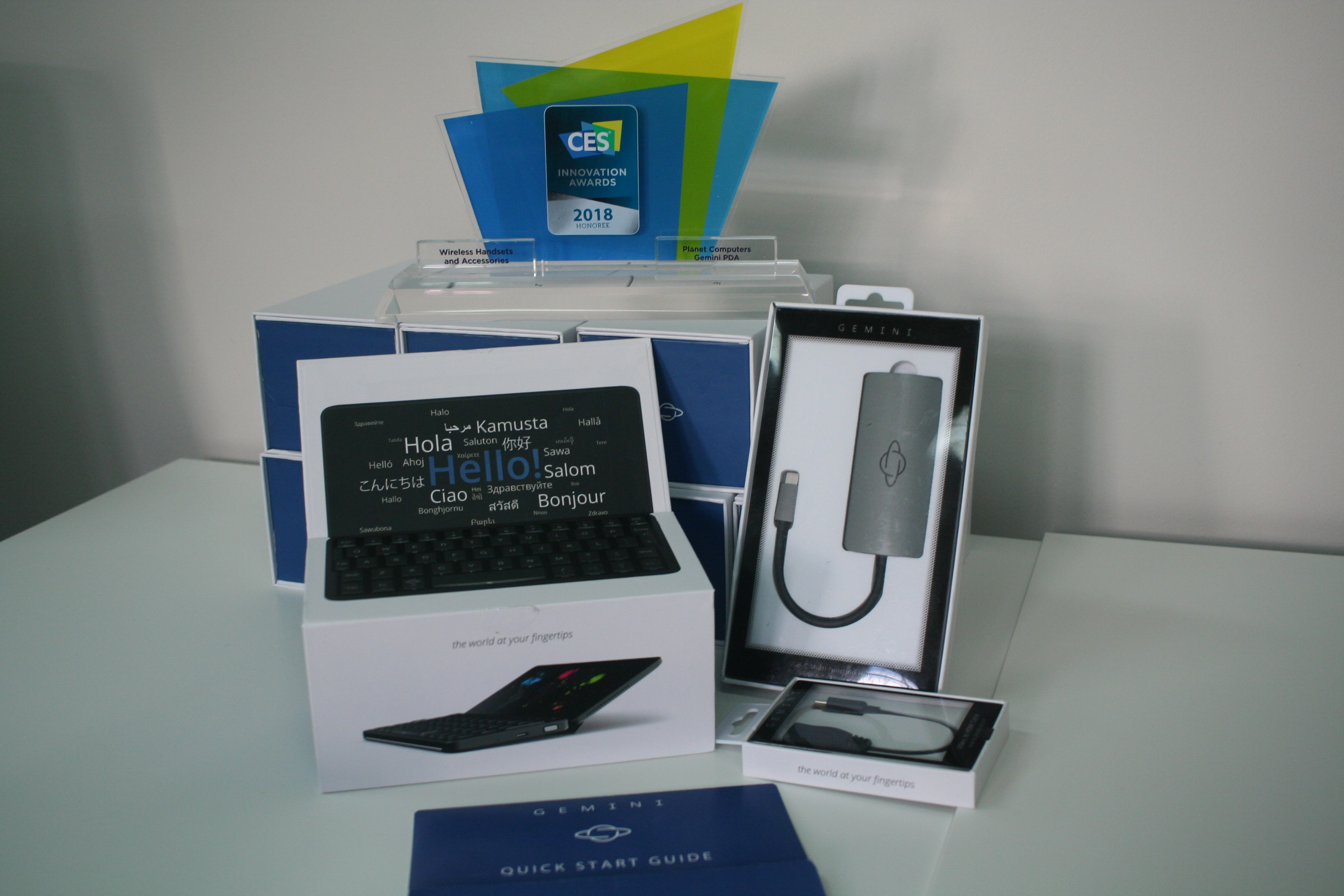
Accessories supplied with Gemini PDA, plus CES 2018 Award

The original Indiegogo campaign allowed backers to pay extra for various accessories and features:

- Leather pouch
- HDMI adaptor
- Rear camera 5MP
- USB-C hub

== Successors ==
Planet Computers announced successor models to the Gemini, called the Cosmo Communicator and Astro Slide 5G Transformer, that share the same basic form factor. Cosmo Communicator is a dual nano-SIM 4G device, and Astro Slide 5G Transformer is a dual nano-SIM 5G device.
