= Nokia N9 =

Smartphone model

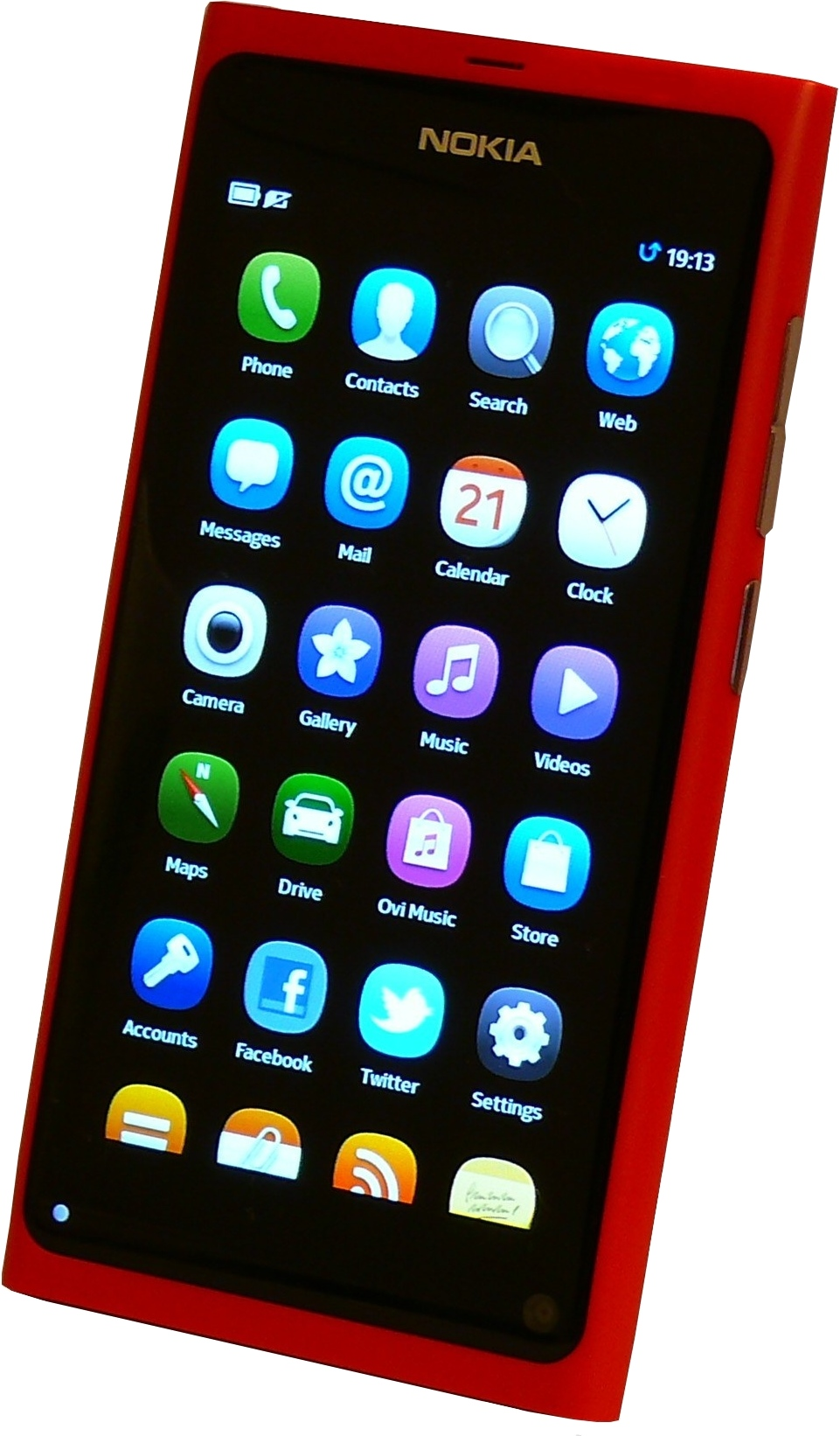
- Nokia N9 phone running Meego 1.2 Harmattan software
- Manufacturer: Nokia manufactured in Finland
- Series: Nseries
- Predecessor: Nokia N900; Nokia N8
- Successor: Nokia Lumia 900
- Related: Nokia Lumia 800
- Compatible networks: GSM 850 / 900 / 1800 / 1900; GPRS/EDGE class B, multislot class 33; HSDPA (Pentaband); HSDPA/UMTS 850 / 900 / 1700 / 1900 / 2100; HSDPA Cat10, up to 14.4 Mbps; HSUPA Cat6, up to 5.7 Mbps
- Dimensions: Width: 61.2 mm; Height: 116.45 mm; Thickness: 7.6 to 12.1 mm
- Weight: 135 g (5 oz)
- Operating system: MeeGo 1.2 "Harmattan"
- CPU: 1 GHz ARM Cortex-A8 SoC processor; TI OMAP3630; 3D Graphics PowerVR SGX530 GPU; 430 MHz TI TMS320C64x Digital signal processor
- Memory: 1 GB Mobile DDR
- Storage: 16 or 64 GB
- Removable storage: none
- Battery: BV-5JW 1450 mAh Li-Ion battery (removable by service); micro USB charging
- Rear camera: 8.7 MP (CMOS sensor of 1/3.0" size) with Carl Zeiss optics (F2.2, Focal length: 3.77mm / 28mm), 720p at 30 FPS, Digital zoom 4X for camera and video
- Front camera: VGA
- Display: "ClearBlack" AMOLED 854 × 480 px (FWVGA), 3.9" (99.1 mm), 16.7 million colors (24 bits)
- Connectivity: WLAN IEEE 802.11 a/b/g/n (2.4 and 5GHz); bluetooth 2.1 +EDR (Hardware Supports 4.0; micro USB 2.0; GPS and A-GPS; 3.5 mm AV connector (audio in/out, video in/out, tv-set out)); Near Field Communication (NFC); Digital Living Network Alliance (DLNA); micro SIM card; FM receiver
- Data inputs: Capacitive multi-touch display; External functional hardware keys; Accelerometer (3-axis); Magnetometer (3-axis); Proximity sensor; Ambient light detector; Stereo microphone + 2nd microphone for active noise cancellation
- Development status: Discontinued
- Other: polycarbonate unibody (unpainted)

The Nokia N9 (codename Lankku) is a flagship smartphone developed by Nokia, running on the Linux-based MeeGo mobile operating system. Announced in June 2011 and released in September, it was the first and only device from Nokia with MeeGo, partly because of the company's partnership with Microsoft announced that year. It was initially released in three colors: black, cyan and magenta, before a white version was announced at Nokia World 2011.

Despite a limited release, the N9 received widespread critical acclaim, with some describing it as Nokia's finest device to date. It was praised for both its software and hardware, including the MeeGo operating system, buttonless 'swipe' user interface, and its high-end features. The case would be reused for the Windows Phone-powered Nokia Lumia 800 which was released later that year.

== Background ==
The successor of Nokia N900, internally known as N9-00, was scheduled to be released in late 2010, approximately one year after N900 launched. Pictures of the prototype leaked in August 2010 showed an industrial design and a 4-row keyboard. A software engineer working for Nokia's device division cited the N9-00 (the product number) in the public bug tracker for Qt, an open source application development framework used in MeeGo. This would later be known as the N950. This design was dropped; then Nokia started working on the N9-01, codenamed Lankku, a new variant without a keyboard.

Nokia planned in 2010 to make MeeGo their flagship smartphone platform, replacing Symbian, whose N8 flagship launched that year. Thus effectively N9 was originally meant to be the flagship device from the company. On 11 February 2011 Nokia partnered with Microsoft to use Windows Phone 7 as the flagship operating system to replace Symbian, with MeeGo also sidelined. Nokia CEO Stephen Elop promised to still ship one MeeGo device that year, which would end up as the N9.

Nokia N9 was announced on 21 June 2011 at the Nokia Connection event in Singapore. At the time, the phone was presumed to become available to the public in September 2011. Users can get notified via e-mail of the availability of N9 in their country at the webpage of the Nokia Online Store. Since Nokia closed its Nokia Online Shop in many countries, including Poland, Germany, Netherlands, France, Italy, Spain, United Kingdom, and the United States on 30 June 2011, availability in those countries will be in the hands of retailers and operators.

Elop restated that the company will not be continuing development of MeeGo even if the N9 would be a success, focusing solely on the future Lumia series, something that MeeGo supporters already felt before the N9 announcement due to the Microsoft deal. They responded by creating a petition "We want Nokia to keep MeeGo". That was even more severe as MeeGo Linux was also a form of continuation of Maemo Linux, which was established with combining Nokia's Maemo with Intel's Moblin, in frames of Nokia and Intel alliance created for purposes of such cooperation. Despite the success of the alliance, it was broken and MeeGo canceled by Stephen Elop's decision. Intel officially expressed regrets because of this situation. After the N9's positive reception and generally weak sales of its Lumia range, Elop was criticised for this move, which has been said by some to have contributed to the company's demise in the smartphone market. According to Elop following the Microsoft alliance, MeeGo became an experimental "project", with some of Harmattan's interface elements being used in the cancelled "Meltemi" project and later the Nokia Asha platform.

=== Availability ===
In August 2011, Nokia announced that Nokia N9 will not be released in the United States. Other reports indicated that the device will not be available in other markets such as Japan, Canada and Germany. Nokia posted on the official blog in the last week of September 2011 that N9 phones are heading to the stores. The initial retail price was announced to be around €480 (16GB) and €560 (64GB) before applicable taxes or subsidies. In Germany, devices imported from Switzerland are available online from Amazon and German Cyberport GmbH. In January 2012, they were also made available in some major stores of the Saturn Media Markt chain. In February 2012, Nokia N9 appeared on the Italian Nokia site, which is supposed to be a sign of N9 being in official Nokia distribution for the Italian market.

Prices in January 2012 were, depending on the size of the internal memory, between €500 and €630.

== Hardware ==
=== Processors and memory ===
The Nokia N9 is powered by a Texas Instruments OMAP 3630 which is a System-on-a-chip based on a 45 nanometer CMOS process. It includes three processor units: a 1 GHz ARM Cortex A8 CPU which runs the operating system and applications, an Imagination Technologies PowerVR SGX530 GPU supporting OpenGL ES 2.0 and capable of processing up to 14 million polygons per second; and a 430 MHz TI TMS320C64x, a digital signal processor, which does image processing for the camera, audio processing for telephony and data transmission. The system also has 1 GB of low power single channel RAM (Mobile DDR). Compcache uses part of this memory as compressed fast swap. It was, at the time, the most powerful device Nokia created.

All user data is stored on the internal eMMC chip; in 16 and 64 GB variants. The N9 was the first smartphone to include 64 GB of internal storage.

=== Screen and input ===
Nokia N9 has a 3.9-inch (99 mm) capacitive touchscreen (up to 6 simultaneous points) with a resolution of 854 × 480 pixels (FWVGA, 251 ppi) in PenTile RGBG layout. According to Nokia, it is capable of displaying up to 16.7 million colors. The OLED screen is covered by a curved scratch-resistant Corning Gorilla glass. The gap between the glass and the display was reduced in comparison to older Nokia models and the screen is coated with an anti-glare polarizer to ease the usability in daylight. There is a proximity sensor which deactivates the display and touchscreen when the device is brought near the face during a call. It has also an ambient light sensor that adjusts the display brightness.

The device also makes use of its accelerometer to rotate the screen in portrait/landscape mode for some applications, such as the web browser.

=== GPS ===
N9 has an autonomous GPS feature with optional A-GPS functionality, Wi-Fi network positioning, a magnetometer, and comes pre-loaded with Nokia Maps and Nokia Drive applications.

Nokia Maps is similar to Ovi Maps found on recent Symbian devices from Nokia and is mostly about finding nearby places (restaurants, metro station, theater, etc...) around the user. Nokia Maps for MeeGo is also integrated with the Contacts and Calendar applications. Nokia Drive is a dedicated application for car navigation and provides free lifetime turn-by-turn voice guided car navigation. The Nokia N9 comes with preloaded maps of the continent where it was purchased, and as such, Nokia Drive does not require an active data connection and can work as a stand-alone GPS navigator.

=== Camera ===
The main (back) camera has an autofocus feature, dual LED flash, is optimized for 16:9 and 4:3 aspect ratios, and has a 4× digital zoom for both video and camera. The sensor size of the back camera is 8.7 megapixels (3552 × 2448 px); the effective resolution for the 16:9 aspect ratio is 3552 × 2000 px (7.1 megapixels), and 3248 × 2448 px (8 megapixels) for the 4:3 aspect ratio. Typically, a 16:9 picture format on a digital camera is achieved by cropping the top and bottom of a 4:3 image, since the sensor is 4:3. Nokia N9 genuinely provides more in the width of the picture by choosing the 16:9 aspect ratio option by using the full 3552-pixel width of the sensor, and more in the height of the picture by choosing the 4:3 aspect ratio option by using the full 2448-pixel height of the sensor. The Carl Zeiss lens has quite unusual specifications for a mobile phone: 28mm wide-angle lens focal length, fast (for this class) f/2.2 aperture, and a 10 cm-to-infinity focus range. It is capable of recording up to 720p video at 30 fps with stereo sound.

=== Buttons ===
When holding the device facing the screen, on the right side, there is a power on/off (long press), lock/unlock (short press) button and volume keys. The Nokia N9 has fewer hardware buttons than most smartphones of this time and makes extensive use of the touchscreen to navigate the user interface. For example, to minimize a running application, the user has to swipe their finger from one side of the bezel surrounding the screen to the opposite side. There is also no dedicated shutter key for the camera; the touch screen is instead used to focus and take the picture. The screen can be unlocked by double tapping on it.

=== Audio and output ===
The N9 has two microphones and a loudspeaker situated at the bottom of the phone. The main microphone enables conversation and recording. The second microphone is located on the back of the device near the flash LEDs and main camera, it is used by MeeGo system for noise cancellation which make phone conversations clearer in noisy environment. On the top, there is a 3.5 mm AV connector which simultaneously provides stereo audio output, with support for Dolby Headphone, and either microphone input or video output. Next to the 3.5 mm connector, there is a High-Speed USB 2.0 USB Micro-B connector provided for data synchronization, mass storage mode (client) and battery charging. The USB connector is protected by a small door.

The built-in Bluetooth v2.1 +EDR (Enhanced Data Rate) supports stereo audio output with the A2DP profile. Built-in car hands-free kits are also supported with the HFP profile. File transfer is supported (FTP) along with the OPP profile for sending/receiving objects. It is possible to remote control the device with the AVRCP profile. The Bluetooth chip also functions as an FM Receiver/Transmitter, allowing one to listen to the FM radio by using headphones connected to the 3.5 jack as antenna. As with the Nokia N800, N810 and N900, the N9 shipped without software support for the FM receiver. However, an FM radio application is available on the OVI Store from an independent developer.

NFC is also supported for sharing photos, contacts, or music with other devices supporting NFC (e.g. Nokia C7, Nokia 701) and also pairing (connecting) stereo speakers (e.g. Nokia Play 360) and headset (e.g. Nokia BH-505). More than one device can be connected simultaneously with N9 via NFC.

=== Battery ===
The Nokia N9 has a BV-5JW 3.8V 1450mAh battery. The battery is not user-removable. According to Nokia, this provides from 7 to 11 hours of continuous talk time, 16 to 19.5 days of standby, 4.5 hours of video playback and up to 50 hours of audio playback.

The phone supports USB charging only.

=== Box contents ===
The retail version of the Nokia N9 comes in a blue box. The package contains the phone, a USB cable, USB A/C brick, stereo headset and a start guide booklet.

== Accessories ==
A number of devices can be used with the N9 via several connectivity options: external keyboards via Bluetooth, wireless headphones via NFC, wireless loudspeakers via NFC, and many others.

== System software ==
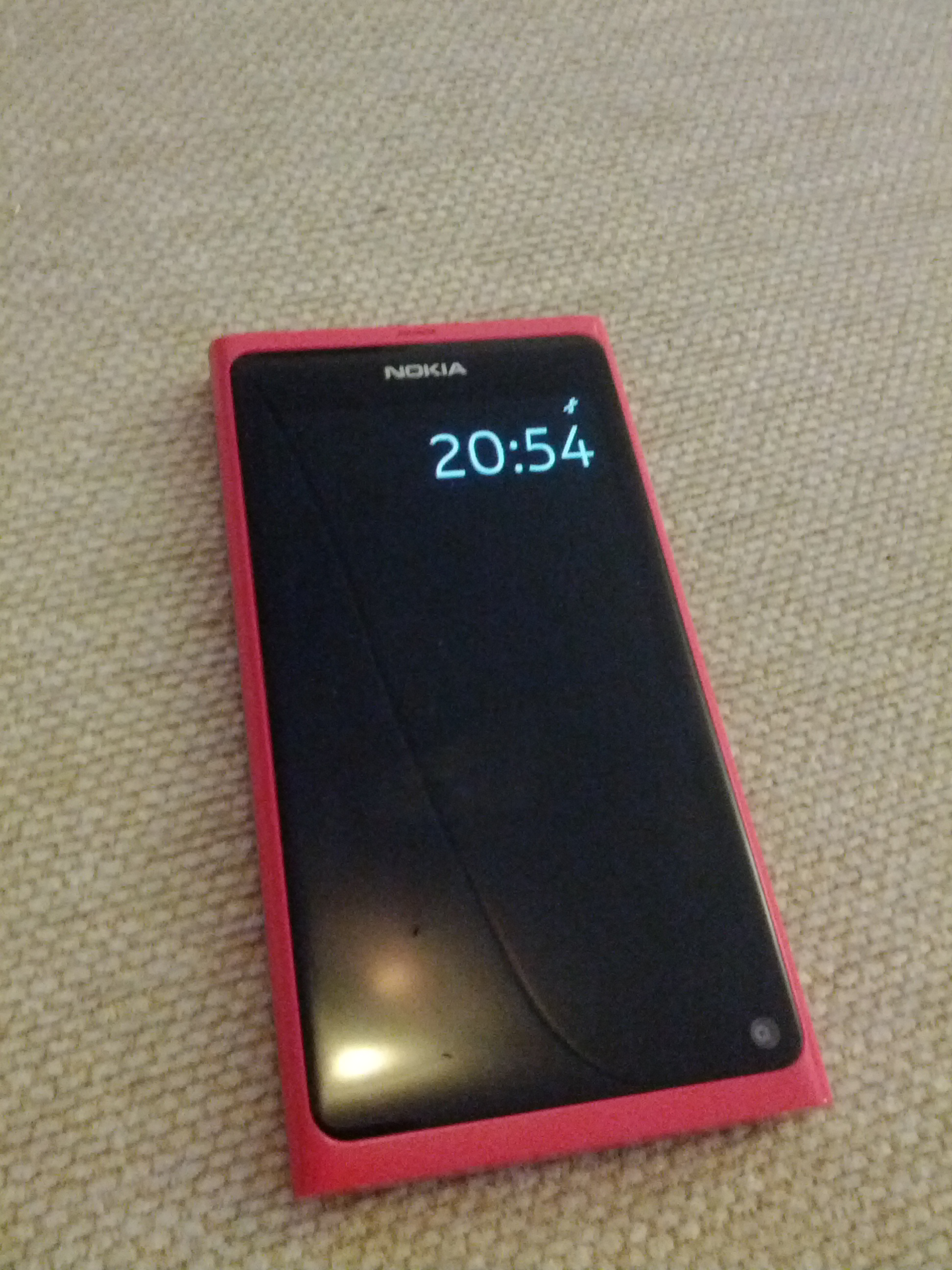
Sleep screen on a red N9, showing the clock and notifications. Notice the Nokia Pure font, the N9 being the first usage of Nokia's new typeface.

=== MeeGo ===
Strictly speaking, the Nokia N9 does not run MeeGo 1.2 as its operating system. It instead runs what Nokia refers to as a "MeeGo instance.” During the development of Harmattan (previously marketed as Maemo 6), Nokia and Intel merged their open source projects into one new common project called MeeGo. Not to postpone the development schedule, Nokia decided to keep the "core" of Harmattan, such as middleware components (GStreamer) and packaging managers (the Harmattan system uses Debian packages instead of RPM packages). Nonetheless, Harmattan is designed to be fully API compatible with MeeGo 1.2 via Qt. As far as end users and application developers are concerned, the distinction between Harmattan and MeeGo 1.2 is minimal. Since all marketing effort would have been directed to "MeeGo", Nokia dropped the Maemo branding to adopt MeeGo as to not confuse customers.

=== Swipe User Interface ===
The Nokia N9 user experience provides three panes, called Home, and a Lock Screen. Dragging or flicking horizontally navigates between the three panes of the home. The Home consists of:

- Events : It holds all the notification such as missed calls, upcoming meeting, unread messages/emails and feeds (web feeds, Facebook, Twitter, etc. if enabled from Notifications settings).
- Applications : Menu with all the installed application shortcuts. It displays 4 columns that can be scrolled up and down as needed by the number of application.
- Open Applications : A task manager that can be viewed either as a 2 columns or 3 columns (a pinch gesture will switch between each mode). If more application are open that can be displayed on the screen, the user can scroll the open applications list up and down.

When in an application a swipe gesture from one edge of the screen to the other one will return the user to one of the three views of Home. This will not close the application, it will either be suspended or keep running in the background, depending on the application. To close an application, the user must press and hold until a red "X" appears on the upper left corner of the application thumbnail in the Open Application view, which will close it. The user may also close apps by swiping from the top of the device and down while in the application (with fadeout effect). Tapping on the status bar on the top of the screen while using an application will display a menu allowing the user to adjust the volume, change the active profile (silent, beep & ringing), Internet connection (WiFi, GSM data), bluetooth control shortcut (if enabled in Bluetooth settings), media sharing (DLNA) shortcut (if enabled in media sharing settings which was introduced in PR 1.2) and availability. The Lock Screen displays the status bar, a clock and some notifications. This screen also holds music controls (introduced in PR 1.1) when the music player is active. It is customizable by the end user.

The phone can be unlocked by double tapping on the screen. Sliding and holding the lock screen up reveals 4 shortcuts, called the Quick Launcher. The Quick Launcher can also be accessed while using an application.

The swiping UI of the N9, including the visual style and double-tap feature, was resurrected in the Nokia Asha platform, which was introduced on the Nokia Asha 501 device in 2013.

== Reception ==
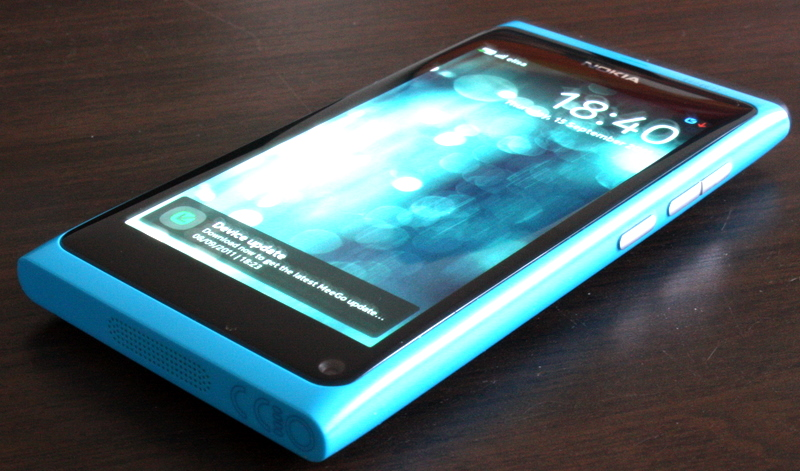
A blue N9

The Nokia N9 was announced at Nokia's Connections event in Singapore, June 2011. The reception for the device has been very positive, citing the MeeGo v1.2 Harmattan UI, pseudo-buttonless design, polycarbonate unibody construction and its NFC capabilities. Still, many reviewers did not recommend to buy the N9 only because of Nokia's earlier decision to drop MeeGo for Windows Phone for future smartphones – often questioning this decision at the same time. Engadget's editor Vlad Savov said in June 2011 that "it's a terrific phone that's got me legitimately excited to use it, but its future is clouded by a parent that's investing its time and money into building up a whole other OS." In a later review, Engadget writes: "Love at first sight — this is possibly the most beautiful phone ever made," and "MeeGo 1.2 Harmattan is such a breath of fresh air it will leave you gasping — that is, until you remember that you're dealing with a dead man walking." In a review for Ars Technica, Ryan Paul writes: "The N9 is an impressively engineered device that is matched with a sophisticated touch-oriented interface and a powerful software stack with open source underpinnings." The Verge (website) writes: "The Nokia N9 is, without doubt, one of the most fascinating phones of the last few years." Gsmarena titled the Nokia N9 review "Once in a lifetime" with overwhelmingly positive feedback.

The German Der Spiegel titles "this could have been Nokia's winner", and the German magazine Stern describes it as one of the best devices ever made by Nokia. Delimiter called the N9 Nokia's "most significant" handset since the Nokia N95.

=== Sales ===
The Nokia N9 has not been released in most of the largest smartphone markets such as the U.S., Canada, UK, the Netherlands, Germany, France, Italy, Spain, and others. Nokia did not disclose the number of sales for the N9.

=== Awards ===
In November 2011, the Nokia N9 won 3 out of 4 applicable titles (including design, camera and cellphone of the year) at a gala held by Swedish magazine and webzine Mobil.se.

In January 2012, the Nokia N9 Swipe UI was nominated for an IxDA Interaction Award.

In February 2012, the N9 reached number 1 in ranking "by rate" with a rate of 8.432 (out of 10) and votes of 74,940, and also number 5 by daily interest hits in GSMArena's ranking.

In April 2012, the N9 was awarded a Design and Art Direction "Yellow Pencil", in the interactive product design category, beating among others the iPad 2 and the Nokia Lumia 800.

=== Open/closed source packages and community contributions ===
The approach applied by Nokia is one of an open platform, with exception, and a closed user experience. As with Maemo 5 on the Nokia N900, the community can request a closed source component owned by Nokia to be released as open source.

Hundreds of 3rd party applications, mostly free and open source, have already been created or ported to the Linux MeeGo Harmattan platform.

=== Released updates ===
Version	Release date	Notable changes
PR 1.0 10.2011.34-1	September 2011	Initial release
PR 1.1 20.2011.40-4	November 2011	Music controls on the lock screen, additional filters to the camera application, NFC tag reading, Twitter image sharing, Swype keyboard, Chinese language support, noise cancellation using second microphone
PR 1.2 30.2012.07-1	March 2012	Folders in the Applications view, Continuous shutter mode in Camera, Google Talk video calls, improvements to the Nokia Drive application such as Speed limit settings, defining home location, etc., DLNA media sharing, software update notifications for 3rd party applications (downloaded from Nokia Store), playlist support in music player, enhancements to the Mail for Exchange address book (ability to access corporate mail address directory), Universal Copy and paste support and in the stock browser; Thai, Hebrew, Persian, Vietnamese and Kazakh language support
PR 1.3 40.2012.21-3	July 2012	Over 1000 quality improvements including Mail, Facebook, Twitter, minor network & connectivity improvements

== Ports for the N9 ==
=== Android 2.3 port leak ===
Images of an N9 prototype running Android 2.3 were leaked to Sina Weibo by a user who had previously uploaded prototype images of Nokia's Sea Ray (later Lumia 800) Windows Phone. They were believed to be likely genuine, as Stephen Elop had mentioned Nokia had considered Android in the past.

=== Android 4.1.1 Jelly Bean ===
An unofficial Android 4.1.1 port by the NITDroid community was made. The port features general functionality but misses some features such as voice calling and use of the camera.

=== Sailfish OS ===
On 21 November 2012, Jolla announced and demonstrated Sailfish OS, which is direct continuation and based on MeeGo. Above 80% of the first Linux Sailfish OS is the open source part of the Linux MeeGo. The original MeeGo open source code was developed further in frames of Mer (software distribution) which comes from MEego Reinstated and has established current standard of the middleware stack core, so software above a kernel and below a UI of OS, what's more it is open source and free for vendors. The Harmattan UI and several software applications used in the N9 was closed and proprietary of Nokia, hence could not be used neither in MER project nor Sailfish OS. So Jolla introduced its own swipe UI, used MER core standard and created Sailfish OS. Videos of the Sailfish OS running on a Nokia N950 appeared on the Internet the same day as the announcement. As the N950 has similar technical specifications as the N9, with slight differences including a physical QWERTY keyboard, this led many owners of the N9 to believe that Sailfish OS can be ported to the N9. Jolla confirmed this, but also stated that it has no "official possibilities" for such kind of support for the N9, and instead the community will provide the unofficial port for Sailfish OS. However, Jolla maintained that the experience will not be the same as the Sailfish on official Jolla phones (Jolla released the first Jolla mobile phone on 27 November 2013). Sailfish OS is the first full Linux MeeGo OS, as the MeeGo Harmattan was only a "MeeGo instance" because of not fully finished combining of Maemo and Moblin. Sailfish OS is actively developed and commonly assumed to be next and better incarnation of MeeGo, also Jolla device is assumed unofficial successor of the N9 and its legacy by all means.

=== KaiOS ===
In early 2019 KaiOS Technologies Inc. demonstrated the devices running KaiOS. There was the Nokia 8110 (2018), Jio Phone, and one full touch device suspected to be Nokia N9.

== See also ==
- Nokia N950 developer's mobile for N9 software development
- Jolla the Finnish company continuing MeeGo smartphones manufacturing which employed almost the whole engineering team which has designed the Nokia N9 and the original Linux MeeGo OS.
- Sailfish OS informally the next incarnation and successor of MeeGo Linux by Jolla.
- Jolla (smartphone) first mobile with the Sailfish OS 1.0, considered as N9's successor.
- Sailfish Alliance the alliance created with Jolla to promote MeeGo based Linux Sailfish and worldwide MeeGo ecosystem.
- List of open-source mobile phones
- List of Nokia products
- Nokia X family
- Nokia 6
- Nokia 8 Sirocco
