= Dalvik Turbo virtual machine =

Dalvik Turbo
- Original author: Myriad Group
- Operating system: Linux
- Platform: Android and others
- Type: Virtual machine
- License: Proprietary commercial software

Dalvik Turbo was created as a proprietary compatibility layer alternative to Google's implementation of the Dalvik virtual machine that runs on the Android operating system and other platforms. It was originally developed by French/Swiss firm Myriad Group. Dalvik Turbo has an alternative version which runs on non-Android platforms, Sailfish OS, which is known as Alien Dalvik.

The virtual machine runs the Java platform on compatible mobile devices, and it can also run applications which have been converted into a compact Dalvik Executable (.dex) bytecode format for lower end devices.

In 2011, MIPS Technologies entered into a license agreement with Myriad to make their Dalvik Turbo Virtual Machine (VM) available to its licensees as part of its standard distribution of Android for its MIPS architecture.
