= List of language bindings for Qt 5 =

— Columns detailing the features covered by the binding are missing. —

Qt language bindings
Language	Name: description of binding	License for open-source applications	License for proprietary applications
C++	Qt – built-in	GPL or LGPL	LGPL or commercial proprietary
C++	Slint	GPL	Commercial proprietary
C	DOtherSide	GPL or LGPL	
C#	QtSharp	Apache 2.0	
C#	Qml.Net	MIT	
Crystal	Crystal Qt6	MPL2	
D	QtE5	MIT	
Go	qt – therecipe/qt	LGPL	
Go	qt.go – kitech/qt.go	LGPL	
Go	MIQT – mappu/miqt	MIT	
Go	qamel – go-qamel/qamel - Only for QML	MIT	
Haskell	qtHaskell	custom	
Haskell	Qtah	LGPL	
Haskell	HsQML	BSD 3-clause	
Java	Qt Jambi (for Qt5 and Qt6)	LGPL	LGPL or commercial proprietary
JavaScript	NodeGUI – Node.js binding for Qt5	MIT	
JavaScript	QtQuick – built into Qt	LGPL	LGPL or commercial proprietary
JavaScript	Slint	GPL	Commercial proprietary
Julia	QML.jl – for QML, plus some Qt6 support	LGPL	
Lua	lqt5	MIT	
Nim	nimqml – only for QML	LGPL	
Nim	nimqt	LGPL	
Pascal	Lazarus with Qt5 interface	LGPL	
Python	PyOtherSide – only for QML	ISC	
Python	PyQt	GPL	Commercial proprietary
Python	Qt for Python – Qt's official Python bindings	LGPL	LGPL or commercial proprietary
Python	PythonQt	LGPL	
OCaml	lablqml – QML support	LGPL	LGPL or commercial
QML	QtQuick – built into Qt	LGPL	LGPL or commercial proprietary
Ruby	ruby-qml – only for QML	MIT	
Rust	ritual	MIT or Apache 2.0	
Rust	qmetaobject-rs – mostly for QML	MIT	
Rust	Slint	GPL	Commercial proprietary
Scheme	Qt Egg for Chicken Scheme	BSD	
Zig	Qml-Zig – only for QML	Apache	

== See also ==
- List of language bindings for Qt 4
- List of language bindings for GTK+
- List of language bindings for wxWidgets
- List of Qt language bindings from the qt-project.org wiki
