= Remarkable =

Remarkable may refer to:

- Remarkable (stationery), a British company that makes stationery products out of recycled materials
- reMarkable, an E Ink writing tablet for reading, sketching, and note-taking
- ReMarkable (manufacturer), the company behind the E Ink writing tablets
