= AsteroidOS =

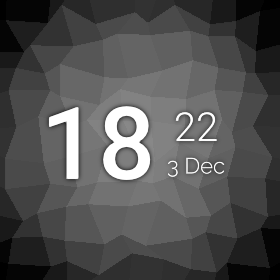
- AsteroidOS 1.0 default watchface
- Developer: Florent Revest and the AsteroidOS community
- Written in: Qt/QML
- OS family: Unix-like
- Working state: Active
- Source model: Open source
- Latest release: 2.0 / 17 February 2026; 5 months ago
- Marketing target: Smartwatch
- License: Various GPL licenses
- Official website: asteroidos.org

AsteroidOS is an open source operating system designed for smartwatches. It is available as a firmware replacement for some Android Wear devices. The motto for the AsteroidOS project is "Free your wrist."

Wareable.com reviewed version 1.0 and gave it 3.5 out of 5 stars.

== Software Architecture ==
AsteroidOS is built like an embedded Linux distribution with OpenEmbedded. It works on top of the Linux kernel and the systemd service manager. AsteroidOS also includes various mobile Linux middlewares originally developed for Mer and Nemo Mobile such as lipstick and MCE.

The user interface is completely written with the Qt5 framework. Applications are coded in QML with graphic components coming from Qt Quick and QML-Asteroid. An SDK with a cross-compilation toolchain integrated to Qt Creator can be generated from OpenEmbedded for easier development.

Asteroid-launcher is a Wayland compositor and customizable home screen managing applications, watchfaces, notifications and quick settings. Asteroid-launcher runs on top of the libhybris compatibility layer to make use of Bionic GPU drivers.

AsteroidOS offers Bluetooth Low Energy synchronization capabilities with the asteroid-btsyncd daemon running on top of BlueZ5. A reference client named AsteroidOS Sync is available for Android users. There is also a Companion App for Sailfish OS(Starship) and one for Ubuntu Touch(Telescope), but it has not yet been updated to the current release of Ubuntu Touch. An app for Linux-based smartphones like the Librem 5 distributed by Purism is also in the making(Buran), but cannot be used due to a currently still unfixed bug in Qt5.

== Shipped Applications ==
As of the 1.1 nightly release, the following applications are shipped and pre-installed by default in AsteroidOS:

- Agenda: Provides simple event scheduling capabilities
- Alarm Clock: Makes the watch vibrate at a specific time of day
- Calculator: Allows basic calculations
- Compass: A functional Compass app (only preinstalled on devices with supported sensors)
- Diamonds: A game, which is inspired by 2048.
- Flashlight: A simple flashlight app where the screen acts as a light source.
- Heart Rate: An app for heart-rate-monitor bpm retrieval
- Music: Controls a synchronized device's music player
- Settings: Configures Time, Date, Language, Bluetooth, Brightness, AOD(on supported devices), Nightstand, Wallpapers, Custom Launchers, Watch faces and USB Modes (Charging, ADB, SSH, MTP)
- Stopwatch: Measures an elapsed time
- Timer: Counts down a specified time interval
- Weather: Provides weather forecast for five days

== See also ==
- Wear OS
- Sailfish OS
- Ubuntu Touch
- OpenEmbedded
- Hybris (software)
- Qt (software)
- Linux (Kernel)
