= List of language bindings for Qt 4 =

As shown in the table below, Qt has a range of bindings for various languages that implement some or all of its feature set.

Qt 4 language bindings
Language	Name: description of binding	QtCore	QtDesigner	QtGui	Equivalent for uic	QtNetwork	QtOpenGL	QtSql	QtScript	QtSvg	QtTest	QtUiTools	QtWebKit	QtXml	License for open-source applications	License for proprietary applications
Ada	QtAda	Yes	Yes	Yes	No	No	Yes	Yes	No	No	No	Yes	No	Yes	GNU GPL	GMGPL + fee
C++	Qt – native C++	Yes	Yes	Yes	Yes	Yes	Yes	Yes	Yes	Yes	Yes	Yes	Yes	Yes	GPL or LGPL	LGPL or Proprietary + fee
C# & .NET	Qyoto – See also Kimono for KDE	Yes	Yes	Yes	Yes (uics)	Yes	Yes	Yes	Yes	Yes	Yes	Yes	Yes	Yes	LGPL	LGPL
C# & .NET	qt4dotnet	Yes		Yes	WIP	Yes	Yes	Yes	Yes	Yes	Yes	Yes	Yes	Yes	LGPL	LGPL
D	QtD	Yes	Yes	Yes	Yes (duic)	Yes	Yes	No	No	Yes	No	No	Yes	Yes	Boost Software License+GPL	Boost Software License+GPL
Haskell	Qt Haskell				No											
Haskell	HsQML				No										BSD License	BSD License
Harbour	HbQt	Yes	Yes	Yes	Yes (hbmk2)	Yes	Yes	Yes	Yes	Yes	No	No	Yes	Yes	GNU GPL	LGPL like
Java	Qt Jambi	Yes	Yes	Yes	Yes (juic)	Yes	Yes	Yes	Yes	Yes	Yes	Yes	Yes	Yes	LGPL	LGPL
Julia	through PySide or other	Yes													MIT/LGPL for Python language PySide itself	LGPL
Lisp	CommonQt – Bindings for Common Lisp	Yes	Yes	Yes	No	Yes	Yes	Yes	Yes	Yes	Yes	Yes	Yes	Yes	BSD License	BSD License
Lua	lqt – Bindings	Yes	Yes	Yes	No	Yes	Yes	Yes	Yes	Yes	No	Yes	Yes	Yes	MIT	MIT
Lua	QtLua – Bindings and script engine														LGPL	LGPL
Pascal	FreePascal Qt4	Yes	Yes (lazarus RAD IDE)	Yes	No	Yes	No	No	No	No	No	No	Yes	Yes	LGPL	LGPL
Perl	PerlQt4	Yes	Yes	Yes	Yes (puic)	Yes	Yes	Yes	Yes	Yes	Yes	Yes	Yes	Yes	GNU GPL+Artistic License	Artistic License
PHP	PHP-Qt	Yes	Yes	Yes	WIP	Yes	Yes	Yes	Yes	Yes	Yes	Yes	Yes	Yes	LGPL	LGPL
Python	PyQt	Yes	Yes	Yes	Yes (pyuic)	Yes	Yes	Yes	Yes	Yes	Yes	Yes	Yes	Yes	GNU GPL	Proprietary + fee
Python	PySide	Yes	Yes	Yes	Yes (pysideuic)	Yes	Yes	Yes	Yes	Yes	Yes	Yes	Yes	Yes	LGPL	LGPL
Python	PythonQt	Yes	No	Yes	—N/a	Yes	Yes	Yes	No	Yes		Yes	Yes	Yes	LGPL	LGPL
QML	QML – It is part of Qt	Yes	Yes	Yes	—N/a	Yes	Yes	Yes	Yes	Yes	Yes	Yes	Yes	Yes	LGPL	LGPL or Proprietary + fee
R	qtbase	Yes	Yes	Yes		Yes	Yes	Yes	Yes	Yes	Yes	Yes	Yes	Yes	GPL	No
Ruby	QtRuby	Yes	Yes	Yes	Yes (rbuic)	Yes	Yes	Yes	Yes	Yes	Yes	Yes	Yes	Yes	LGPL	LGPL
Ruby	qtbindings														LGPL	LGPL
Scheme	Qt Egg for Chicken Scheme	No	Yes	Yes	No	Yes	Yes	No	No	No	No	Yes	No	No	BSD License	BSD License
Tcl	qtcl				No										GNU GPL	No
Language	Name: description of binding	QtCore	QtDesigner	QtGui	Equivalent for uic	QtNetwork	QtOpenGL	QtSql	QtScript	QtSvg	QtTest	QtUiTools	QtWebKit	QtXml	License for open source applications	License for proprietary applications

== See also ==
- List of language bindings for Qt 5
- List of language bindings for GTK+
- List of language bindings for wxWidgets
