= QGtkStyle =

Software for GUIs

QGtkStyle is an open-source startup project to create a GTK+ layer for Qt-based applications running on GTK2-based desktops. It intends to make Qt applications blend perfectly into GTK-based desktop environments such as GNOME.

QGtkStyle currently requires gtk2 development packages and Qt 4.4 and can be freely downloaded from SVN repository of Trolltech Labs.

Released under the terms of GNU General Public License 3.

QGtkStyle was incorporated in Qt starting with version 4.5.

== See also ==
- GTK-Qt (GTK-Qt at kde-look.org)
- QtCurve (QtCurve at kde-look.org)
