= Phil Hess =

American business executive

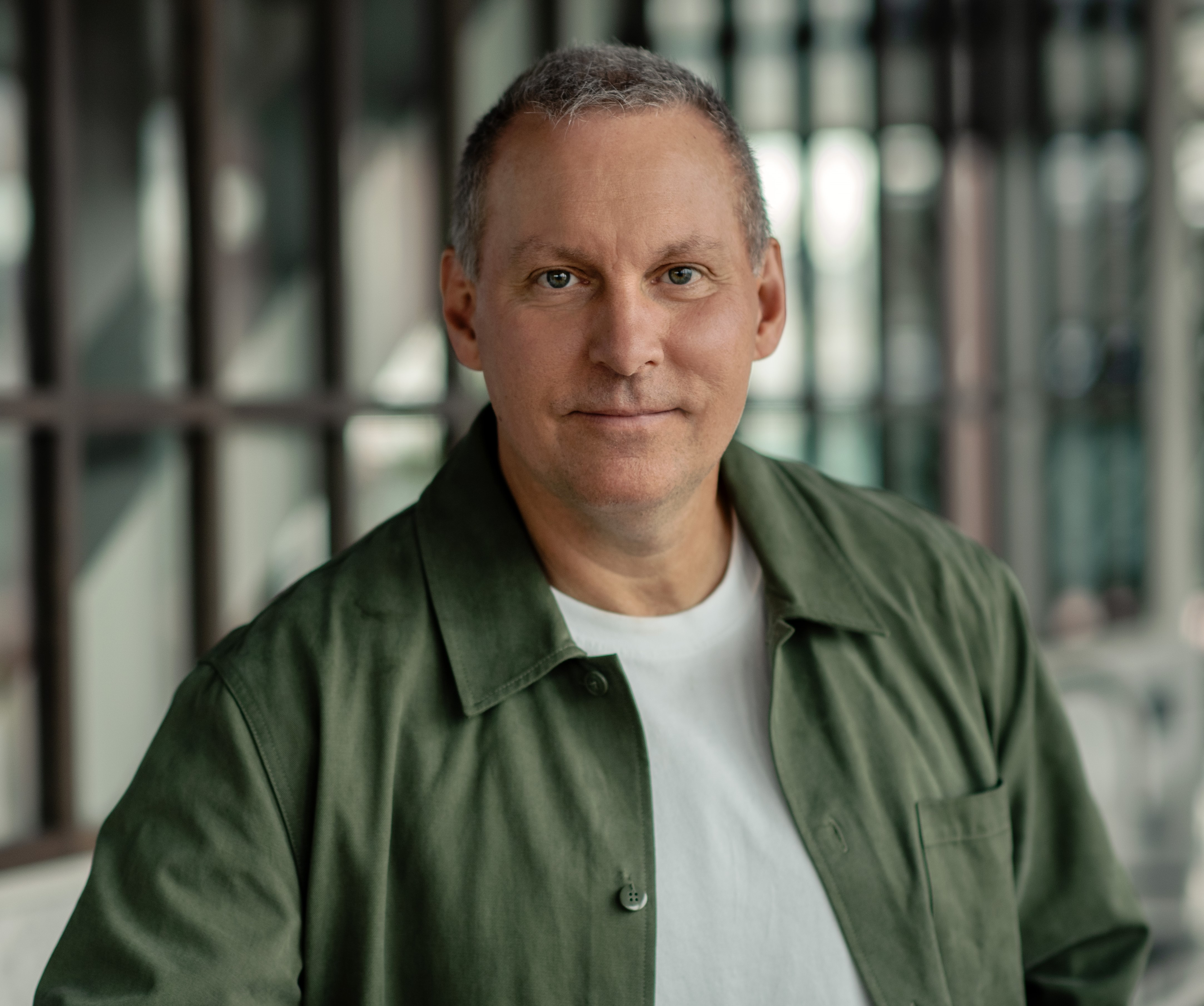
- Hess in 2025
- Born: United States
- Citizenship: American
- Education: Duke University (MBA, Master's in Engineering), Bachelor of Science in Physics
- Occupation: Business executive
- Years active: 1992–present
- Known for: CEO of reMarkable, former President and CEO of Bose Corporation

Phil Hess is an American business executive in the consumer technology industry who is the CEO of reMarkable, a company in digital paper tablets.

== Career ==
He began his career as a developer at a software start-up before spending four years as a management consultant.

In 1996, Hess joined Bose Corporation, where he served for 24 years in various leadership roles, including president and CEO. During his tenure, he took part in expanding the company’s product offerings and implementing sustainability initiatives.

After leaving Bose in 2020, Hess served as the chief operating officer of Signifier Medical Technologies, a company focused on developing medical devices for sleep-related conditions.

In December 2023, reMarkable announced Philip Hess as its new CEO, effective January 1, 2024. His appointment followed a global recruitment effort led by reMarkable’s board of directors and executive chairman, Magnus Haug Wanberg, the company’s founder and former CEO. At reMarkable Hess is focused on expanding the company’s market presence and enhancing the functionality of its digital paper tablets.
