= GJS =

GJS may refer to:

- GoJet Airlines, an American airline
- Greenwich Japanese School, in Connecticut
- GJS, a JavaScript interpreter; see List of language bindings for GTK
