= QBS =

QBS may refer to:

- QBS (band), a South Korean T-ara sub-group
- Qbs (build tool), a free software package
- QBS-09, a military shotgun
- Quota Borda system, a multi-member election method
