= List of language bindings for GTK =

As shown in the table below, GTK has a range of bindings for various programming languages that implement some or all of its feature set. GTK 2 is unsupported now, so some languages below lack current GTK support.

- GObject (GOB) was initially written as a central component of GTK, but outsourced into GLib.
- GObject Introspection is a middleware layer between C libraries (using GObject) and language bindings, e.g. PyGObject uses this, while PyGTK does not.
- Official GNOME Bindings follow the GNOME release schedule which guarantees API stability and time-based releases.
- Glade Interface Designer

| Language | Name | Supported? | | | | License | Notes |
| Language | Name | 2.24 | 3.12 | 4.0 | GIR | License | Notes |
|---|---|---|---|---|---|---|---|
| Ada | GtkAda | Partial | Partial | ? | Yes | GPL-3 | Supported up to 3.14. |
| C | GTK | Yes | Yes | Yes | —N/a | LGPL-2.1 | Native, no binding needed. |
| C++ | gtkmm | Yes | Yes | Yes | No | LGPL-2.1 | |
| C# and other CLI languages | GtkSharp | No | Yes | No | No | LGPL-2.1 | Support for GTK 3 is available up to 3.22. |
| C# and other CLI languages | Gir.Core | No | No | Partial | Partial | MIT | |
| Crystal | crystal-gobject | No | Yes | Partial | Yes | BSD | |
| Crystal | gtk4.cr | No | No | Yes | Yes | MIT | |
| D | GtkD | Yes | Yes | No | Yes | LGPL-3 with exceptions | Supported since 2.12 |
| Erlang | gtknode | Partial | No | No | No | MIT | No, partly supported up to 2.16 |
| Fortran | gtk-fortran | Partial | Partial | Partial | No | GPL-3 | Supported since 2.24. Supports GTK 3 and GTK 4. |
| FreeBASIC | FreeBASIC GTK bindings | Yes | Partial | No | No | LGPL-3 with exception | Supported up to 3.4 and since 2.8, integrated into the core distribution. |
| Gambas | Gambas gb.gtk component | Yes | Partial | ? | No | GPL-2 | Secondary to the primary Qt components |
| Genie | Genie | Yes | Yes | Yes | Yes | LGPL-2.1 | language written for GObject system |
| Go | go-gir-generator | ? | ? | ? | Yes | GPL-3 | |
| Go | gotk3 | No | Partial | ? | No | ISC | |
| Guile | guile-gnome | Partial | No | ? | No | GPL-2 | supported up to 2.12, partly supported on 2.14 |
| Haskell | Gtk2Hs | Yes | Partial | ? | No | LGPL-2.1 | Gtk2Hs is a set of Haskell bindings to many of the libraries included in the GTK/GNOME platform. |
| Haskell | haskell-gi | No | Yes | Yes | Yes | LGPL-2.1 | Generate Haskell bindings for GObject Introspection capable libraries |
| J | J GTK addon | Partial | No | ? | No | GPL-3 | |
| Java and other JVM languages | java-gnome | Yes | Yes | No | No | GPL-2 with exception | Unavailable on Microsoft Windows |
| Java and other JVM languages | Java-GI | No | No | Yes | Yes | LGPL-2.1 | Works with OpenJDK 25 or later |
| Julia | Gtk4.jl | Yes | Yes | Yes | No | MIT | Includes Glib support |
| JavaScript | Gjs | Yes | Yes | Yes | Yes | MIT | GNOME wiki, based on Mozilla's SpiderMonkey |
| JavaScript | Node-Gtk | No | Yes | Partial | Yes | MIT | |
| JavaScript | Seed | Yes | Yes | ? | Yes | LGPL-2.1 | GNOME wiki, based on WebKit's JavaScriptCore |
| Kotlin/Native | gtk-kt | No | Partial | Partial | Partial | AGPL-3.0 | |
| Kotlin/Native | gtk-kn | No | No | No | Partial | LGPL-3 | |
| Lua | LGI | Partial | Yes | Yes | Yes | MIT | |
| Lua | lgob | No | Yes | ? | Yes | LGPL-3 | |
| Nim | gintro | No | Yes | Yes | Yes | MIT | |
| OCaml | LablGtk | Partial | Partial | ? | No | LGPL-2.1 with exception | Supported up to 2.16 |
| ooRexx | RexxGTK | Partial | No | ? | No | CPL | Yes, 2.0 or later |
| Objective-C | CoreGTK | No | Partial | ? | No | LGPL-2.1 | |
| Objective-C | ObGTK | Partial | No | ? | No | LGPL-2.1 | |
| Objective-C | Objective-C GTK | Partial | No | ? | No | LGPL-2.1 | |
| Pascal | Free Pascal gtk package | Yes | Yes | ? | No | LGPL-3 with exception | Supported up to 2.24, integrated into the core distribution. Gtk 3.0 bindings are being developed in the Lazarus-ccr project. |
| Perl | Gtk2-Perl | Yes | Yes | No | Yes | LGPL-2.1 | |
| PHP | PHP-GTK | Partial | Partial | ? | No | LGPL-2.1 | PHP until 5.2, GTK is GTK2 |
| Prolog | PLGI | Partial | Yes | ? | Yes | LGPL-2.1 | |
| Python | pgi | Partial | Partial | ? | Yes | LGPL-2.1 | GObject Introspection Bindings for PyPy. |
| Python | pygir-ctypes | Partial | Partial | ? | Yes | BSD | |
| Python | PyGObject | Yes | Yes | Yes | Yes | LGPL-2.1 | since 2.22 |
| Python | PyGTK | Yes | No | No | No | LGPL-2.1 | |
| R | RGtk2 | Partial | No | ? | No | GPL-2 | RGtk2.pdf |
| Racket | gir | ? | ? | ? | Yes | MIT | |
| Ruby | GirFFI-Gtk | Partial | Partial | ? | Yes | LGPL-2.1 | |
| Ruby | Ruby-GNOME2 | Partial | Yes | Yes | No | MIT License | Partial, supported up to 2.12, partly supported since 2.14 |
| Rust | gtk-rs | No | Yes | Yes | Yes | MIT | |
| Rust | gi-rust | No | Yes | ? | Yes | LGPL-2.1 | |
| Smalltalk | GNU Smalltalk GTK+ bindings | Yes | No | ? | No | GPL-2 | |
| Smalltalk | Smalltalk YX GTK plugin | Yes | No | ? | No | MIT | |
| Smalltalk | SqueakGtk | Partial | No | ? | No | MIT | |
| Standard ML | Giraffe Library | No | Yes | ? | Yes | LGPL-2.1 | |
| Tcl | Gnocl | Yes | No | ? | No | BSD | |
| Vala | Vala | Yes | Yes | Yes | Yes | LGPL-2.1 | Language written for GObject system |
| Wrapl | Wrapl GTK+ module | Partial | No | ? | No | GPL-3 | No, but almost full up to 2.22 |

== See also ==
- List of language bindings for Qt 4
- List of language bindings for Qt 5
- List of language bindings for wxWidgets
