= Q Public License =

Software license

- Author: Trolltech AS
- Latest version: 1.0
- Publisher: Trolltech AS
- Published: 1999; 27 years ago
- SPDX identifier: QPL-1.0
- Debian FSG compatible: No
- FSF approved: Yes
- OSI approved: Yes
- GPL compatible: No
- Copyleft: No

The Q Public License (QPL) is a non-copyleft license, created by the company Trolltech for its free software edition of the Qt toolkit and framework. It was used until Qt 3.0, until version 4.0 was released under the Free Software Foundation's (FSF) GNU General Public License (GPL) version 2.

It fails the Debian Free Software Guidelines, used by several Linux distributions, though it qualifies for the FSF's Free Software Definition; however, it is incompatible with the FSF's GPL, meaning that products derived from code under both the GPL and the QPL cannot be redistributed.

== History ==
KDE, a desktop environment for Linux, is based on Qt. Only the free open source edition of Qt was covered by the QPL; the commercial edition, which is functionally equal, is under a pay-per-use license and could not be freely distributed. Meanwhile, the Free Software Foundation and authors of the GPL objected to the QPL as it was a non-copyleft license incompatible with the GPL. As KDE grew in popularity, the free software community urged Trolltech to license Qt under the GPL to ensure that it would remain free software forever and could be used and developed by commercial third parties. Eventually, under pressure, Trolltech dual-licensed the free edition of Qt 2.2 for use under the terms of the GPL or the QPL.

== Adoption ==
Other projects that have adopted the Q Public License, sometimes with a change in the choice of jurisdiction clause, include:

- LibreSource is a versatile collaborative platform provided by artenum and dedicated to collaborative software development
- Jpgraph is a graph generation tool written in PHP that dynamically produces charts and graphs as image files for presentation on websites.
- Hercules, a software implementation of the System/370, ESA/390, and z/Architecture mainframe computer architectures. On January 1, 2024, Jay Maynard announced a proposal to relicense Hercules under an MIT License on July 1, 2024. however this proposal was rejected as it did not have the unanimous approval of all of the copyright holders.
- Tgif switched from a free-of-charge non-commercial license to the Q Public License.

Prior projects using the Q Public License include:

- The OCaml compiler and related tools from Projet Cristal at INRIA. Since April 2016, OCaml is released under the GNU Lesser General Public License version 2.1 with linking exception.
- Computational Geometry Algorithms Library (CGAL) for versions 3.x. The CGAL library is released under GNU General Public License (GPL) and GNU Lesser General Public License (LGPL) since CGAL version 4.0 (March 2012).

The Debian project rejects software covered by solely QPL (and not dual licensed with something else like the GPL) because of:

- A choice of venue clause
- Forced distribution to a third party
- Forced blanket license to the original developer

== Compliance ==
All legal disputes about the license are settled in Oslo, Norway, but it has never been legally contested.

== See also ==
- Open source license
