= ReMarkable (manufacturer) =

Norwegian technology company

reMarkable AS
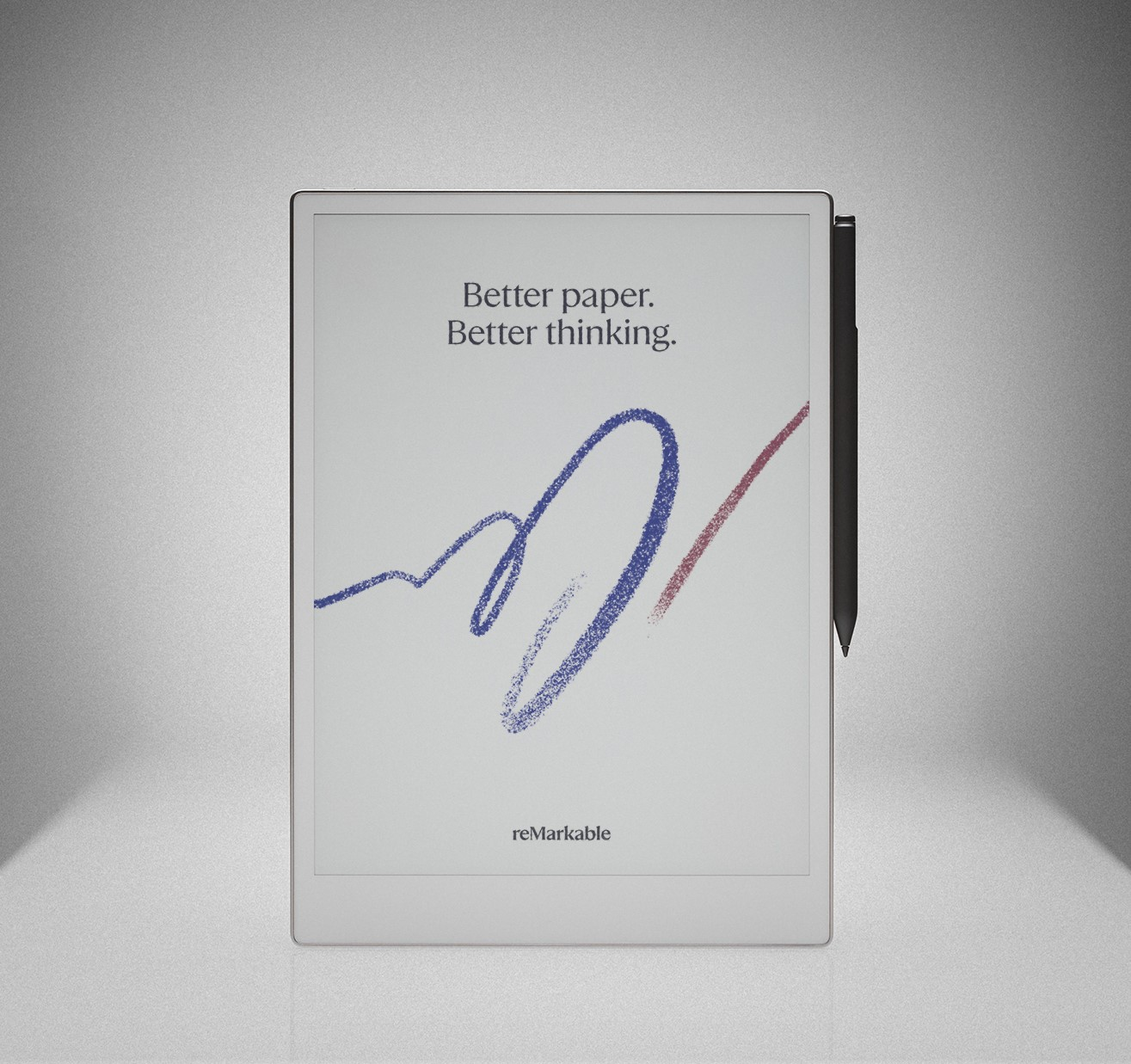
- Type: Private
- Industry: Consumer electronics
- Founded: September 1, 2013; 13 years ago
- Founder: Magnus Haug Wanberg
- Headquarters: Oslo, Norway
- Key people: Phil Hess (CEO)
- Products: reMarkable 1, reMarkable 2, reMarkable Paper Pro, Type Folio, reMarkable Paper Pro Move
- Revenue: US$434.3 million (2024)
- Number of employees: ~200 (2026)
- Website: remarkable.com

reMarkable is a Norwegian technology company that develops digital paper tablets designed to replicate the feel of writing on paper.

The first version of the tablet, the reMarkable 1, began shipping in 2017. In 2020, reMarkable released the second iteration of its tablet, the reMarkable 2. In 2024, the company released the reMarkable Paper Pro, their first e-paper tablet to feature color and frontlight. The company also manufactures and sells its keyboard accessory, the Type Folio.

== History ==
reMarkable was founded in 2013 by Magnus Haug Wanberg, and set out to create a digital device that could replicate the tactile feel of writing on paper. The company spent the next few years researching, developing, working on prototypes, and refining its technology. By 2016, reMarkable had developed its first prototype. reMarkable opened pre-orders for its first product in November 2016, the reMarkable 1 tablet, which featured an e-ink display that provided a paper-like writing experience. The first units began shipping on August 29, 2017. The reMarkable 1 received positive reviews for its innovative approach to digital note-taking and its focus on reducing distractions. reMarkable sold approximately 45,000 units in 2017, generating a revenue of 184 million NOK (US$23 million). On October 8, 2019, reMarkable announced its $15M Series A funding round, led by Spark Capital, which allowed the company to expand its operations and further develop its product line.

On March 17, 2020, reMarkable announced the reMarkable 2, the next generation of its paper tablet. The reMarkable 2 featured a thinner design, improved battery life, and improved writing experience. It was marketed as the world's thinnest tablet. On Nov 19, 2020, Time Magazine named the reMarkable 2 one of the most innovative products of 2020.

On October 21, 2021, reMarkable introduced the Connect subscription service, offering additional features such as unlimited cloud storage, handwriting conversion, and integration with third-party apps. On May 10, 2022, reMarkable announced that it had sold over 1 million units. reMarkable announced changes to the Connect ecosystem, lowering the cost of Connect on September 20, 2022. On November 3, 2022, reMarkable launched its products at Best Buy, marking the first time its tablets were available through a major US retailer.

On March 7, 2023, reMarkable released the Type Folio, an accessory that added a tactile keyboard to the reMarkable 2, improved its functionality for focused typing. reMarkable launched in the UK retail store Curry's on February 7. On February 28, 2023, reMarkable made the Financial Times' list of Europe's fastest-growing companies, coming in at number 128, a jump from their 2022 ranking of 266.

In September 2024, reMarkable launched the reMarkable Paper Pro, featuring an 11.8-inch color display and an adjustable reading light. reMarkable earned several awards and badges from multiple media outlets, including the Editor's Choice from Tom's Guide, TechRadar Recommends award, Editor's Choice award from Engadget, SlashGear Select award from SlashGear, a Digital Trends Recommended Product award from Digital Trends, an Editor's Award from Magnetic Magazine, a Staff Pick award from How to Geek, and a Staff Pick award from AndroidPolice. Engadget rated the reMarkable Paper Pro as "the best premium e-ink tablet" while also stating "reMarkable 2 was the best e-ink tablet for most people." CNN Underscored named the reMarkable Paper Pro as their "favorite tech product of 2024". Gear Patrol placed it on its "The 100 Most Important New Products of 2024" list.

On September 3, 2025, reMarkable launched the reMarkable Paper Pro Move, a more compact 7.3-inch version of the Paper Pro aimed at portability. The device weighs around 230 grams, is rated for up to two weeks of battery life, and launched at US$449.

== Operations ==
reMarkable's paper tablets are manufactured primarily in China and Vietnam, with distribution managed through warehouses in Hong Kong, Mexico, the Netherlands, and the United States. According to the company's 2024 annual report, reMarkable sold approximately 791,000 devices and had around 568,000 paying Connect subscribers during 2024, up from 672,000 devices and 338,000 subscribers the previous year The company reported a net profit of US$24.7 million for 2024 on revenue of US$434.3 million.

== Financing ==
In October 2024, the company's parent, reMarkable Invest AS, issued a senior secured floating-rate bond of NOK 500 million, due October 2027, which was listed on Euronext Oslo Børs. ABG Sundal Collier and DNB Markets acted as joint lead managers. In its 2024 annual report, reMarkable described the bond listing as a step toward a possible future public listing of the company.

== Product reception ==
=== Critical reception ===
The reMarkable 1 received positive reviews for its approach to digital note-taking and its focus on reducing distractions. In November 2020, Time named the reMarkable 2 one of its most innovative products of the year.

The reMarkable Paper Pro, released in September 2024, drew broadly favorable reviews and a number of editorial awards, including Editor's Choice from Tom's Guide, the TechRadar Recommends award, Editor's Choice from Engadget.

=== Customer support ===
While the company's hardware has been well received, its customer support has attracted criticism. reMarkable does not operate an inbound customer service telephone line, instead directing users to online self-service portals, live chat, and has no email contact system. On consumer review platforms such as Trustpilot, the company holds a mixed rating, with reviewers praising the product's design while reporting difficulties with warranty claims, replacement logistics, and subscription billing.

Recurring complaints include warranty processes that require customers to return a faulty device before a replacement is shipped, hardware failures occurring shortly after the expiry of the one-year limited warranty, and difficulty cancelling the Connect subscription without affecting warranty coverage. The standard warranty covers manufacturing defects for one year, with extended coverage of up to three years available through the Connect subscription's protection plan.
