= QtJambi =

Java bindings for Qt framework

- Stable release: 6.12.0 / 14 October 2026; 4 days ago
- Written in: Java
- Operating system: Cross-platform
- License: LGPL
- Website: github.com/OmixVisualization/qtjambi/wiki
- Repository: github.com/OmixVisualization/qtjambi

QtJambi is a Java binding of the cross-platform application framework Qt. It enables Java developers to use Qt within the Java programming language. In addition, the QtJambi generator can be used to create Java bindings for other Qt libraries and future versions of Qt. Unlike GTK, there are no Swing LAF implementations that use Qt for rendering.

QtJambi supports Linux and other flavours of Unix such as macOS, as well as Microsoft Windows.

QtJambi was originally developed by TrollTech (currently known as "The Qt Company") until March 2009, but development didn't continue after being bought by Nokia, as official support for QtJambi by Nokia ended in March 2010. The project was spun off into an open source project, which was later adopted by Omix Visualization.

== QtJambi hello world ==
package org.wikipedia.qt;

import io.qt.widgets.*;
public class Test {
	public static void main(String[] args) {
		QApplication.initialize(args);
		QMessageBox.information(null, "QtJambi", "Hello World!");
		QApplication.shutdown();
	}
}
