= Tgif (program) =

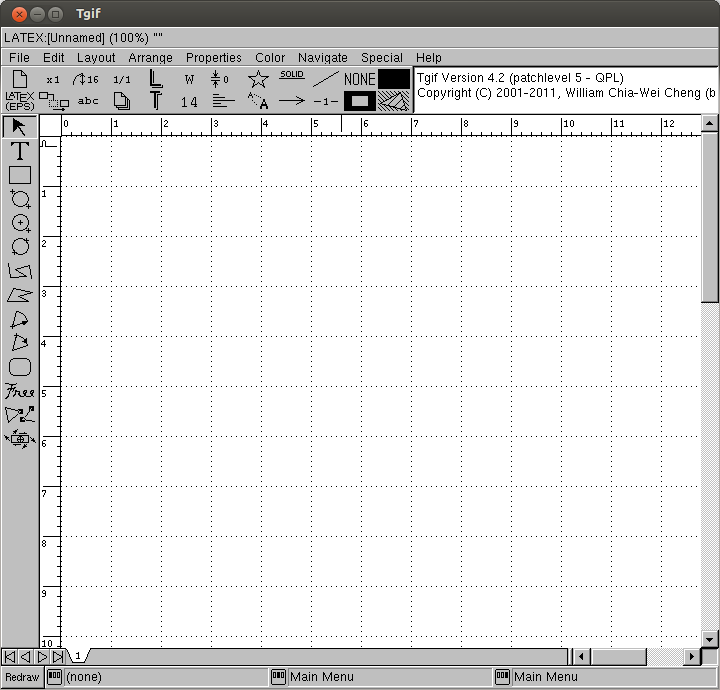
- Screenshot of Tgif 2.4.5 on Ubuntu 12.04
- Original author(s): William Chia-Wei Cheng
- Stable release: 4.2.5 / June 28, 2011; 14 years ago
- Written in: C
- Operating system: Linux, RISC OS, FreeBSD, NetBSD, Debian, SunOS
- Available in: 2 languages
- List of languages English, Japanese
- Type: Graphics software
- License: QPL
- Website: bourbon.usc.edu/tgif/

Tgif (pronounced t-g-i-f) is an Xlib-based interactive 2-D drawing tool (using vector graphics) under X11 on Linux and most UNIX platforms (including Mac OS X and cygwin on Windows). It was developed in 1990 and is free software released under the QPL license.

== Quirks ==
Because Tgif was developed long before a standard way for drawing programs to work, one might find it unfamiliar to use in a number of ways:

- Although Tgif mention point sizes, it uses a unit that is 1/128 of an inch for point sizes.
- While there is an option to display font sizes in points, the sizes are still subject to rounding to the nearest 1/128".
- Unlike modern drawing programs, Tgif uses spline curves instead of Bézier curves.
- Also unlike modern drawing programs, Tgif does not allow the user to select a colour from a color wheel or through controls that allow the user to adjust colour values. Instead, Tgif provides a list with a short list of colours. If the user wishes to use a colour that is not in the list, they would need to add their desired colour to the list. This list is then saved with the currently-open drawing.
- Usable fonts are listed in a configuration file. If the user wishes to use fonts that are not on the list, they would have to change the configuration file.
- Only fonts in the ISO 8859-1 encoding (i.e. "square") CJK fonts and symbols or dingbat fonts can be used.
- Rescaling can lead to ugly defect, which is most likely due to both the use of integer coordinates and roundoff errors.
- Because Tgif uses Xlib (which predated modern Unicode support) Tgif does not and cannot support Unicode.

== The Tgif file format ==
Tgif saves drawings in a Prolog-based plain text file format. Because the program is based on Prolog, there isn't a lot of support from other programs for reading the Tgif file format.

Fonts are represented as PostScript font names. Originally, it was possible to print Tgif drawings in batch mode without using an X display. However, this feature changed somewhere in the 4.1 versions. Currently, in order to print drawings, the user would need to be running Tgif on an X display. This restriction cannot be applied if the drawing only uses Times Roman, Helvetica, Courier, and/or Symbol fonts.
