= Magnus Haug Wanberg =

Norwegian entrepreneur

Magnus H. Wanberg
- Born: Norway
- Education: Master of Science in Industrial Economics and Technology Management, NTNU
- Alma mater: Norwegian University of Science and Technology (NTNU), Harvard Business School (Fulbright Fellow), Massachusetts Institute of Technology (MIT)
- Occupations: Entrepreneur, CEO (former), Executive Chairman (former)
- Known for: Founder of reMarkable

Magnus Haug Wanberg is a Norwegian entrepreneur and founder of reMarkable, a company specializing in digital paper technology. Wanberg served as CEO of reMarkable for nearly a decade before stepping down in December 2022.

== Education ==
In 2011, Wanberg received a Master of Science in Industrial Economics and Technology Management from the Norwegian University of Science and Technology (NTNU). At NTNU, he spent a year as a Fulbright Fellow at the Harvard Business School and attended classes at the Massachusetts Institute of Technology (MIT).

== Career ==
After graduating from NTNU, Magnus worked for a year as an associate at the Boston Consulting Group.

In 2013, Wanberg founded reMarkable. Magnus Wanberg was inspired to create reMarkable after realizing that while paper improved his focus and thinking, it lacked the flexibility of digital tools, leading him to develop a paper-like tablet that merges the best of both worlds.

He then spent more than three years developing the original paper tablet, reMarkable 1, which was announced in 2016 and launched in September 2017. reMarkable 2 was launched in 2020. Now the company sells the reMarkable Paper Pure, reMarkable Paper Pro, reMarkable Paper Pro Move and keyboard accessory Type Folio to over 50 countries worldwide.

Under Wanberg's leadership, reMarkable grew rapidly, expanding from a small startup to a company with over 500 employees and a valuation exceeding $1 billion. The company was recognized twice by the Financial Times as one of Europe's fastest-growing companies. In 2022, reMarkable announced it had sold over 1 million tablets worldwide.

In December 2022, Wanberg stepped down as CEO, transitioning to the role of Executive Chairman of the board, which again he retired from in December 2025.
