= Qt Quick =

Software application

- Developer: Qt Project
- Release: 21 September 2010; 16 years ago
- Website: wiki.qt.io/Qt_Quick

Qt Quick is a free software application framework developed and maintained by the Qt Project within the Qt framework. It provides a way of building custom, highly dynamic graphical user interfaces with fluid transitions and effects, which are becoming more common especially in mobile devices. Qt Quick includes a declarative scripting language called QML.

Qt Declarative is a runtime interpreter that reads the Qt declarative user interface definition, QML data, and displays the UI that it describes. The QML syntax allows using JavaScript to provide the logic, and it is often used for this purpose. It is not the only way, however: logic can be written with native code as well.

Qt Quick and QML are officially supported in Qt 4.7 (with Qt Creator 2.1), and it is a commercial option in mobile applications when Qt 4.7 is available for deployment in Symbian and Maemo and MeeGo devices. It is also the native language of Ubuntu Touch.

== Version history ==
Qt Version	QtQml	QtQml.Models	QtQuick	QtQuick.Particles	QtQuick.Controls	QtQuick.Layouts	QtQuick.Dialogs	QtQuick.WebEngine
Qt 4.7.1			1.0					
Qt 4.7.4			1.1					
Qt 5.0	2.0		2.0	2.0				
Qt 5.1	2.1	2.1	2.1	2.0	1.0	1.0	1.0	
Qt 5.2	2.2	2.1	2.2	2.0	1.1	1.1	1.1	
Qt 5.3	2.2	2.1	2.3	2.0	1.2	1.1	1.2	
Qt 5.4	2.2	2.1	2.4	2.0	1.3	1.1	1.2	1.0
Qt 5.5	2.0	2.2	2.5	2.0	1.4	1.2	1.2	1.1
Qt 5.6	2.0	2.2	2.6	2.0	1.5	1.2	1.2	1.2
Qt 5.7	2.0	2.2	2.7	2.0	2.0	1.2	1.2	1.3
Qt 5.8	2.0	2.2	2.8	2.0	2.1	1.2	1.2	1.4
Qt 5.9	2.0	2.2	2.9	2.0	2.2	1.2	1.2	1.5
Qt 5.10	2.0	2.2	2.10	2.0	2.3	1.2	1.2	1.5
Qt 5.11	2.11	2.11	2.11	2.11	2.4	1.11	1.11	1.7
Qt 5.12			2.12		2.12			
Qt 5.13	2.13	2.13		2.13		1.11	1.11	1.9
Qt 5.14	2.14	2.14	2.14	2.14	2.14	1.14	1.3	
Qt 5.15	2.15	2.15	2.15	2.15	2.15	1.15	1.3	
Qt 6.0			6.0		6.0			

== See also ==
- GTK Scene Graph Kit - Similarly-purposed library and API used in GTK
