= List of language bindings for wxWidgets =

As shown in the table below, wxWidgets has a range of language bindings for various programming languages that implement some or all of its feature set.

Language	Binding	Latest release	Latest release date
Python	wxPython	4.3.2	2026-10-14
PHP	wxPHP	3.0.0.2	2014-04-08
Erlang	wxErlang	1.9	2022-04-13
Haskell	wxHaskell	0.92.3	2017-04-28
Haxe	HaxeUI	3.4.7	2022-10-25
Tcl	wxTCL		
Lua	wxLua	3.2.0.2	2022-11-06
Perl	wxPerl	0.9931	2017-04-17
Ruby	wxRuby3	1.6.1	2025-07-22
Smalltalk	wxSqueak	0.5.1	2008-07-06
BASIC	wxBasic	2.8.12.30	2011-05-05
FreeBasic	wx-c	2.8.12	
BlitzMax	wxMax	1.01	2009-10
C	wxC		
D	wxD	0.16	2011-08-26
Euphoria	wxEuphoria	0.16.0	2011-06-20
.NET	wx.NET	0.9.2	2010-07-14
Java	wx4j	0.2.0	2004-04-01
JavaScript	GLUEscript	0.2.00	2012-12-27
JavaScript	wxNode	0.1.0	2012-04-20

== See also ==
- List of language bindings for GTK+
- List of language bindings for Qt 4
