= List of platforms supported by Qt =

== Official platforms ==
The following platforms are officially supported by Qt:

Platform	Details
Android	Qt for Android (Android 6.0 or later (API level 23 or higher), i.e. all currently supported 32-bit and 64-bit and popular unsupported versions); for Qt 5 Android Lollipop and later, i.e. all currently supported and popular unsupported versions). formerly known as Necessitas
Embedded Linux	Qt for embedded platforms: personal digital assistant, smartphone, etc.
Integrity	Qt for Integrity
iOS	Qt for iOS platforms (iPhone, iPad), iOS 13 and later; for Qt 5, iOS 11 and later. Support for tvOS 11 and later and watchOS 4 and later as a technology preview, while it's no longer supported with Qt 6.
macOS	Qt for Apple macOS (64-bit platforms, including Apple M1); supports applications on Cocoa
QNX	Qt for QNX Under free software license and also under "Qt Commercial" license
VxWorks	Qt for VxWorks; only available under a commercial license. Qt 5.5 is currently tested and supported on VxWorks 7 release SR0480 2016-09-16.
Wayland	Qt for Wayland. Qt applications can switch between graphical backends like X and Wayland at load time with the -platform command line option. This allows a seamless transition of Qt applications from X11 to Wayland.
Windows	64-bit (including arm64 as technology preview) 10 and 11 for Qt 6; 32-bit and 64-bit (i.e. x86 and x86_64) for Qt 5.13 for Microsoft Windows 7 and newer, 8.1 and 10; Qt 5.6 version supported: Windows XP and Vista
Windows CE	Older Qt versions had support for Windows CE 6 and Windows Embedded Compact 7.
Windows RT	Universal Windows Platform 10. Previous Qt versions: Support for WinRT-based Windows 8 apps and Windows Phone 8
X11	Qt for X Window System (Linux); FreeBSD, NetBSD, OpenBSD, and DragonFly BSD (and other operating systems) have community support for Qt 4.6 (now no longer supported version).

Qt as of version 6 requires a C++17 compiler, and has some extra support for C++20.

=== External ports ===
After Nokia opened the Qt source code to the community on Gitorious various ports appeared. Here are some of these unofficial platforms:

- Qt for OpenSolaris – Qt for OpenSolaris.
- Qt for Haiku – Qt4 and Qt5 for Haiku.
- Qt for OS/2 – Qt for OS/2, eComStation and ArcaOS.
- Qt for webOS – experimental development of Qt for webOS on Palm Pre.
- Qt for Amazon Kindle DX – experimental development of Qt for Amazon Kindle DX.
- Qt for AmigaOS – Qt for AmigaOS. "a port in progress" of Qt5 for Amiga OS 4 and AmigaOne computers is available.
- Sailfish OS – mobile operating system based on MeeGo.
- Maemo – development is still supported by the community unlike MeeGo and Tizen, which are based on Maemo.

=== Deprecated ports ===
Some ports of Qt are now deprecated and are no longer actively developed. These are list of some of these platforms that may be available, but are not supported anymore:

- Qt for Tizen – Qt for Tizen.
- Symbian – Qt for the Symbian platform. Qt replaced Nokia's Avkon as the supported UI SDK for developing Symbian applications.
- Windows Mobile – Qt for Windows CE 5.0 and Windows Mobile.
- MeeGo / Harmattan The port for MeeGo and the official native API for Nokia N9. No longer supported, though parts of it lives on in the Sailfish port.
- BlackBerry 10 The Qt 5 port for BlackBerry 10 is unmaintained, however BlackBerry 10 itself is based on Qt 4 using a proprietary UI toolkit.
- Qt Ubuntu – Plugin for Qt 5 to provide Ubuntu integration, including support for the Mir display server.
