= Remarkable (stationery) =

British office supply company

- Founded: 1996; 30 years ago
- Founder: Edward Douglas Miller
- Headquarters: UK
- Products: Pencils and office supplies
- Website: remarkable.co.uk

Remarkable Recycled Ltd (05394545 - Incorporated on 16 March 2005) is a UK company that makes stationery products out of recycled materials. With its sister company, Edvironment Ltd, it sells a range of recycled products, such as the recycled CD and vending cup pencil.

== History ==
In 1996, Edward Douglas Miller founded the company with the aim to value waste as a resource. In 1998, it won UK Invention of the Year and a year later won UK environmental company of the year and UK recycled product of the year.

In 2000, as part of the UK millennium celebrations a Remarkable product was announced as a 'Millennium Product' by the Design Council’s Cool Britannia awards. For an exhibition in the Millennium Dome the company made 3.75 million pencils, recycled from plastic cups. In 2011, Edward Douglas Miller appeared on Channel 4's The Secret Millionaire.

In 2002, the company was granted £20,000 by London Remade, and bought brand new binding machines to bind the recycled notepads. This helped Remarkable to be able to create a greater range of products including plastic rulers (also made from vending machine cups), recycled rubber tyres; to make mouse mats and pencil cases.

In 2013, the company set the Guinness World Record for the longest pencil, by producing one 323.51 meters long. However, that length has since been surpassed.

Remarkable worked with Keep Britain Tidy (KBT). Products are co branded, with royalties going to support KBT.

Remarkable Eco solutions Ltd was dissolved in 2016 with the closure of the factory in Worcester in 2014, with the loss of some employees, because of a contract being cancelled with a major wholesaler. Some machinery was sold off, with the trade marks and IPR still remaining with the founder and inventor.

In 2017 production continues, turning UK waste into recycled products.
