= Qt Group =

Finnish software company

Qt Group Plc
- Type: Public
- Traded as: Nasdaq Helsinki: QTCOM
- Industry: Computer software
- Founded: 4 March 1994 (as Trolltech)
- Founders: Eirik Chambe-Eng; Haavard Nord
- Headquarters: Espoo, Finland
- Area served: Worldwide
- Key people: Juha Varelius (CEO) (2008-); Jouni Lintunen (CFO) (2020-)
- Products: Qt, Qt Creator, Qbs, PySide, Coco, Squish, Test Center, Axivion Suite
- Revenue: 180,743,000 (2023)
- Operating income: 47,349,000 (2023)
- Net income: 35,455,000 (2023)
- Number of employees: 775 (2023)
- Parent: Trolltech (1991–2008); Nokia (2008–2011); Qt Project (2011–present); Digia (2012–2014)
- Website: www.qt.io

Qt Group Plc (Note: formerly known as Trolltech, Qt Company, Qt Development Frameworks, Quasar Technologies and Qt Software) (Qt is pronounced "cute") is a software company headquartered in Espoo, Finland. It was formed following the acquisition of Qt by Digia, but was later spun off into a separate, publicly traded company.

The company oversees the development of the Qt framework alongside the Qt Project, and provides tools for UI design, software development, quality assurance and testing, as well as expert consulting services. The company was originally founded as Trolltech in 1994 by Eirik Chambe-Eng and Haavard Nord, and was later acquired by Nokia in 2008 before being sold to Digia.

== History ==
=== Trolltech 1994–2007 ===
Trolltech was founded by Eirik Chambe-Eng and Haavard Nord on 4 March 1994. The duo started writing Qt in 1991; since then, Qt has steadily expanded and improved.

In 2002, Trolltech introduced Qtopia which is based on Qt. Qtopia is an application platform for Linux-based devices such as mobile phones, portable media players, and home media. It is also used in many non-consumer products such as medical instruments and industrial devices. Qtopia Phone Edition was released in 2004, and their Greenphone smartphone is based on this platform.

Trolltech completed an initial public offering (IPO) on the Oslo Stock Exchange in July, 2006.

=== Part of Nokia 2008–2012 ===
On 28 January 2008, Nokia Corporation announced that they had entered into an agreement to make a public voluntary tender offer to acquire Trolltech. The total cost for Nokia was approximately €104 million. On 5 June 2008 Nokia's voluntary tender offer was approved for all the shares in Trolltech. By 17 June 2008, Nokia had completed its acquisition of Trolltech. On 30 September 2008, Trolltech was renamed as Qt Software, and Qtopia was renamed as Qt Extended. On 11 August 2009, the company's name was changed to Qt Development Frameworks.

The Qt environment was a key part of the company's strategy until 2011, when Nokia decided to switch to Windows Phone OS for its smartphones.

=== Part of Digia 2012–2016 ===
Nokia sold the commercial licensing business of Qt to Digia in March 2011. The following year, Digia acquired the entire Qt development environment and related business from Nokia. As a result of the acquisition, Digia became responsible for all of the functions related to Qt technology, including product development. The main goal of the acquisition was to strengthen Digia's position in the Qt ecosystem and expand the availability of Qt technology across a growing number of platforms.

In September 2014, Digia formed The Qt Company, a wholly owned subsidiary dedicated to the development and governance of the Qt platform. In connection with this, the website qt.io went live, combining the open source Qt development and commercial Qt functions that had previously operated at different addresses. Qt products had some 800,000 users globally.

In August 2015, Digia Plc's Board of Directors began to explore the demerger of Digia’s domestic businesses and the Qt businesses into two separate listed companies.

=== Qt Group 2016–current ===
In May 2016, the company went public on NASDAQ Helsinki as QTCOM. In March 2016, Digia Plc's Annual General Meeting resolved on the partial demerger of Digia and the demerger was registered in the trade register on May 1. Digia’s Qt business was transferred to a new company, named Qt Group, and Digia's domestic business segment remained under the Digia brand. Digia’s CEO Juha Varelius was appointed as the CEO of Qt Group. Trading in Qt Group shares began on the main list of the Helsinki Stock Exchange in May 2016.

In 2018, the company had 5,000 customers. Approximately 80% of the Fortune 500 companies are customers of Qt Group.

The company attracted the interest of international investors in spring 2020 when its market capitalization rose above 500 million euros. The company's market capitalization exceeded 1 billion euros in October. The share price had risen by more than 700% from the IPO price. The company's net sales were close to EUR 80 million euros and its earnings were approximately 17 million euros.

By spring 2021, the company’s share price had grown nearly fivefold over a period of one year, and its market capitalization was above 2 billion euros. In April, the company announced that it would acquire Froglogic, a Germany-based developer of test automation tools for applications based on the Qt GUI framework. In August, the company made it to the OMXH25 index. The company's net sales amounted to 121 million euros and it had 455 employees.

In the fall of 2022, the company announced that it would acquire Axivion, a Germany-based company whose products detect issues that erode the quality and performance of software, i.e. static program analysis, among other services.

In March 2023, the company had 706 employees.

== Organization ==
Qt Group's head office is located in Helsinki, Finland. The company has approximately 800 employees worldwide.

The company’s CEO is Juha Varelius, who previously served as the CEO of Digia from 2008 to 2016.

Qt Group has core R&D in Oslo, Norway, as well as large engineering teams in Berlin, Germany, and Oulu, Finland. The company also has offices in China, Finland, France, Germany, India, Japan, Norway, South Korea, and the US.

== Products ==
The company provides a software development framework, tools for software design, development, quality assurance and testing, as well as expert consulting services. Its flagship product is Qt, a multi-platform Graphical User Interface (GUI) framework written in C++. Qt is popular with application developers using C++ but is supported by bindings for other programming languages too, such as Python. Qt also includes packages such as data structures and a networking library. The popular free and cross-platform KDE Plasma desktop environment and software compilation uses the Qt library.

The tools can be used for UI design, programming and quality assurance for mobile and desktop applications, as well as embedded systems, which are used in cars, consumer electronics and domestic appliances, for example.

Qt also earns revenue from licenses for end products developed with its tools.

In 2024, the company’s product portfolio included:

- the Qt development framework and tools
- UI design tools
- quality assurance and testing tools

== Markets ==
Qt Group has customers in 70 industries in over 180 countries and its products are used by approximately 1.5 million developers. In 2018, its largest markets were the USA, Germany, Japan, South Korea, China, France, the UK, Italy and India. The company’s customers operate in a wide range of industries, including consumer electronics, the automotive and aerospace industries, industrial automation, energy, defense, medicine and the media. Its products are used by companies such as Panasonic, LG Electronics, Mercedes-Benz and Hyundai Motor Group.

General Motors uses Qt’s user interfaces to design digital interfaces for its vehicles. The Ultifi software platform launched by GM for over-the-air software updates for its vehicles is based on Qt's products.
