= Qt (software) =

Object-oriented framework for software development

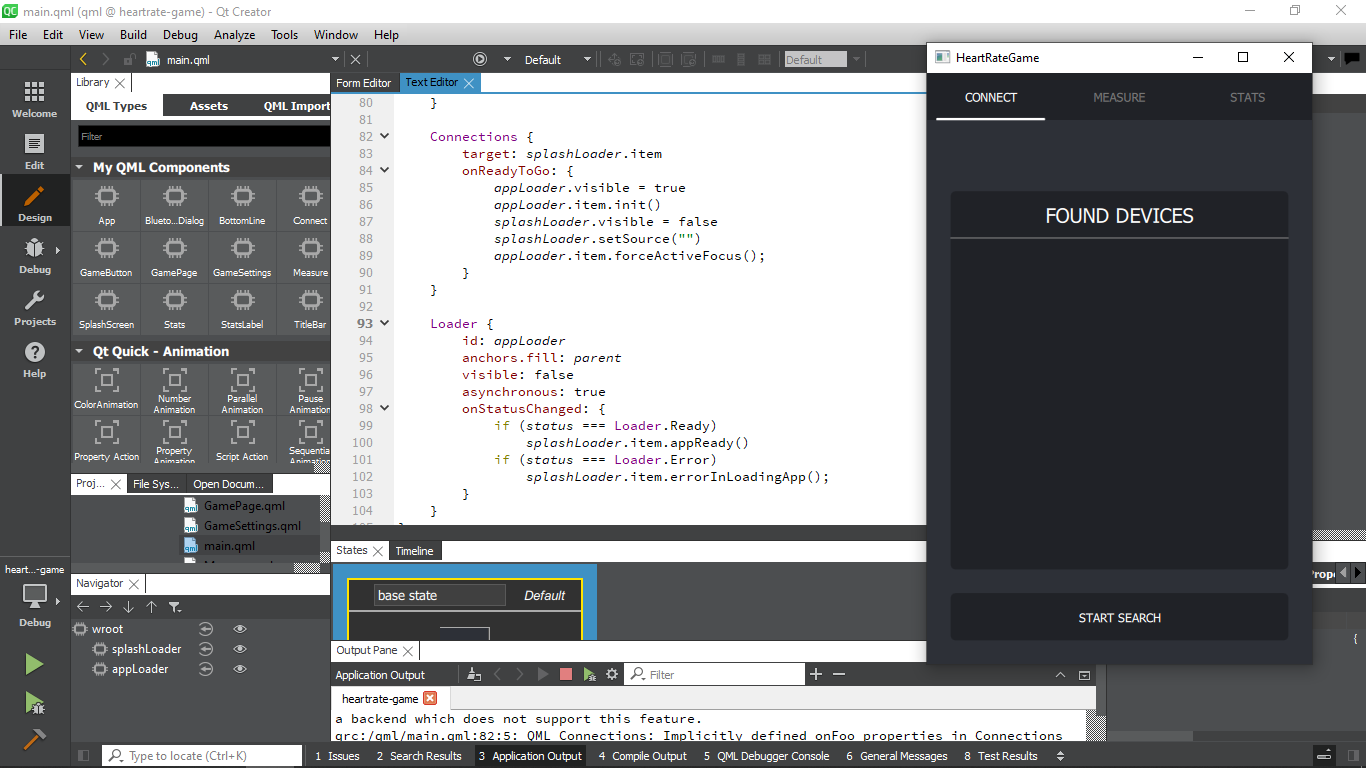
- Screenshot GUI designing in Qt Creator using the embedded Qt Designer on Windows 10
- Original authors: Haavard Nord and Eirik Chambe-Eng
- Developers: Trolltech (1991–2008); Nokia (2008–2011); Qt Project (2011–present); Digia (2012–2014); Qt Group (2014–present)
- Release: 20 May 1995; 31 years ago
- Stable release: 6.12 / 30 September 2026; 40 days ago
- Written in: C++ (C++17)
- Operating system: Android, Genode / Sculpt, Haiku, iOS, Linux (embedded, Wayland, X11), macOS, Microsoft Windows, WebAssembly, ...
- Platform: Cross-platform
- Type: Cross-platform software and Software development tools
- License: Qt Commercial License; GPL 2.0, 3.0; LGPL 3.0
- Website: www.qt.io
- Repository: code.qt.io/cgit/qt/qtbase.git/

Qt (/ˈkjuːt/ pronounced "cute") is a cross-platform application development framework for creating graphical user interfaces as well as cross-platform applications that run on various software and hardware platforms such as Linux, Windows, macOS, Android or embedded systems with little or no change in the underlying codebase while still being a native application with native capabilities and speed.

Qt is currently being developed by Qt Group, a publicly listed company, and the Qt Project under open-source governance, involving individual developers and organizations working to advance Qt. Qt is available under both commercial licenses and open-source GPL 2.0, GPL 3.0, and LGPL 3.0 licenses.

== Purposes and abilities ==
Qt is used for developing graphical user interfaces (GUIs) and multi-platform applications that run on all major desktop platforms and mobile or embedded platforms. Most GUI programs created with Qt have a native-looking interface, in which case Qt is classified as a widget toolkit. Non-GUI programs can also be developed, such as command-line tools and consoles for servers. An example of such a non-GUI program using Qt is the Cutelyst web framework.

Qt supports various C++ compilers, including the GCC and Clang C++ compilers and the Visual Studio suite. It supports other languages with bindings or extensions, such as Python via Python bindings, and has extensive internationalization support. Qt also provides Qt Quick, that includes a declarative scripting language called QML that allows using JavaScript to provide the logic. With Qt Quick, rapid application development for mobile devices became possible, while logic can still be written with native code as well to achieve the best possible performance.

Other features include SQL database access, XML parsing, JSON parsing, thread management and network support.

== Releases ==
The latest version of the Qt Framework is Qt 6.11, which was released on 23 March 2026.

Also still supported are versions 6.10 until 7 October 2026 and 6.8 LTS until 8 October 2029. Version 6.5 LTS is supported for commercial users only until 3 April 2026. Additionally, extended support for all versions 5.0 (released in 2012) and newer is available for commercial users.

Minor versions of Qt are typically released twice a year and are supported until one year after release date under standard support conditions. Typically, every third minor version becomes a long-term support version which gets additional patches. LTS versions are supported for commercial users until five years after their release date (three years prior to version 6.8).

=== Release history ===
The following table summarizes historical Qt releases up to Qt 4.

Version	Release date	Notes
0.90	20 May 1995	First public pre-release version
1.0	24 September 1996	First stable release
1.45	1999	Last release of the Qt 1 series. On 14 October 2016, the KDE community released a restored variant of Qt 1.45 adapted to run on modern Linux systems.
2.0	26 June 1999	Qt/X11 released under the QPL
2.1	13 April 2000	
2.2	7 December 2000	First release available under the GNU GPL v2
2.3	8 March 2001	
3.0	16 October 2001	
3.1	14 November 2001	
3.2	24 July 2003	
3.3	5 February 2004	Improved internationalization, Unicode maturity, Mac support improvements.
4.0	28 June 2005	Major architecture redesign. Arthur painting framework, Model/View framework, Integration of formerly commercial technologies.
4.1	20 December 2005	
4.2	4 October 2006	First mainstream Qt release with SVG support and improved OpenGL integration.
4.3	30 May 2007	
4.4	6 May 2008	
4.5	3 March 2009	Begin of Qt Creator integration era. WebKit becomes a core component.
4.6	1 December 2009	Animation Framework, State Machine Framework, Graphics View improvements.
4.7	21 September 2010	QML and Qt Quick introduced.
4.8	15 December 2011	Final feature release of Qt 4. long-term maintained branch until transition to Qt 5.
4.8.7	26 May 2015	Final release of the Qt 4 series

==== Qt 5 ====
Qt 5 was released on 19 December 2012 and introduced a significantly revised architecture focused on graphical performance, mobile and embedded platforms, and improved modularization. Several Qt 5 releases were designated as long-term support (LTS) releases. Qt 5.15, released on 26 May 2020, was the final feature release of the Qt 5 series. Standard support ended on 26 May 2023, while extended support for subscription license holders continued until 26 May 2025.

Version	Release date	Support end (extended)	Notes
5.0	19 December 2012	19 June 2013	First Qt 5 release. Introduced the Qt Platform Abstraction (QPA), a new graphics architecture and improved support for mobile platforms.
5.1	19 June 2013		iOS and Android support promoted from technology preview. Introduced Qt Quick Controls.
5.2	19 December 2013		First release with official support for iOS, Android and WinRT.
5.3	20 May 2014		Introduced support for Qt WebEngine based on Chromium.
5.4	11 December 2014		Expanded Qt Quick functionality and improved multimedia support.
5.5	30 June 2015		Qt WebEngine declared production ready.
5.6 LTS	16 March 2016	16 March 2019	First Qt 5 LTS release. Added support for Windows 10, Windows Universal Apps and improved high-DPI support.
5.7	16 June 2016		Added preliminary support for macOS Sierra and modern C++ features.
5.8	23 January 2017		Improved Qt Quick performance and support for modern graphics APIs.
5.9 LTS	31 May 2017		Added configuration support for high-DPI displays and substantial Qt Quick performance improvements.
5.10	6 December 2017		Introduced Qt Quick Controls 2 as the recommended controls framework.
5.11	12 June 2018		Improved tooling and performance across Qt Quick and embedded platforms.
5.12 LTS	4 December 2018		Added WebGL streaming support through Qt for WebAssembly. Last Qt version to provide an offline installer.
5.13	18 June 2019	11 December 2019	Continued expansion of WebAssembly support and improvements to Qt Quick.
5.14	11 December 2019		Added support for modern graphics APIs including Vulkan, Metal and Direct3D through the Rendering Hardware Interface (RHI).
5.15 LTS	26 May 2020	26 May 2023 (26 May 2025)	Final feature release of the Qt 5 series. Introduced Qt Quick 3D and completed the transition towards Qt 6. Extended support for subscription license holders continued until 26 May 2025.

==== Qt 6 ====
Qt 6 was released on 8 December 2020 as the successor to Qt 5. It introduced a modernized graphics architecture centered around the Rendering Hardware Interface (RHI), significant improvements to Qt Quick and QML, a revised module structure, and the transition away from several deprecated Qt 5 technologies.

Qt follows a time-based release model with new feature releases approximately twice per year. Selected releases are designated as Long-Term Support (LTS) releases for commercial customers. Since Qt 6.8, the commercial LTS support period has been extended from three to five years.

Version	Release date	Support end	Notes
6.0	8 December 2020	—	Initial Qt 6 release; introduced the Rendering Hardware Interface (RHI), modernized graphics stack and revised module structure.
6.1	4 May 2021	—	Incremental improvements and expanded platform support.
6.2 (LTS)	30 September 2021	September 2024	First Qt 6 long-term support release; improved stability, performance and platform support.
6.3	31 March 2022	—	New APIs and framework refinements.
6.4	29 September 2022	—	Multimedia improvements, enhanced WebEngine support and Qt Quick enhancements.
6.5 (LTS)	3 April 2023	April 2026	Long-term support release; performance improvements, updated modules and continued Qt 5 migration support.
6.6	11 October 2023	—	Performance optimizations, tooling improvements and expanded platform support.
6.7	2 April 2024	—	New Qt Quick capabilities, graphics improvements and framework refinements.
6.8 (LTS)	8 October 2024	October 2029	Long-term support release; Qt Graphs, Qt GRPC and Qt HTTP Server promoted from technical preview. Beginning with Qt 6.8, commercial LTS releases are supported for five years.
6.9	31 March 2025	—	OAuth2 improvements, updated emoji rendering, Qt Quick enhancements and Qt Quick 3D updates.
6.10	17 September 2025	—	Flexbox layouts for Qt Quick, accessibility improvements and vector animation enhancements.
6.11	18 March 2026	—	Hardware-accelerated 2D rendering improvements, Qt Quick 3D enhancements, interactive graphing additions and asynchronous programming improvements.
6.12 (LTS)	30 September 2026	September 2031	Long-term support release; EU Cyber Resilience Act compliance, Qt Canvas Painter, performance improvements, QML hot reloading and HarmonyOS support.

Supported release Unsupported release

== Qt in use ==
In 2017, Qt Group estimated a community of about 1 million developers worldwide in over 70 industries.

=== Desktop UIs ===
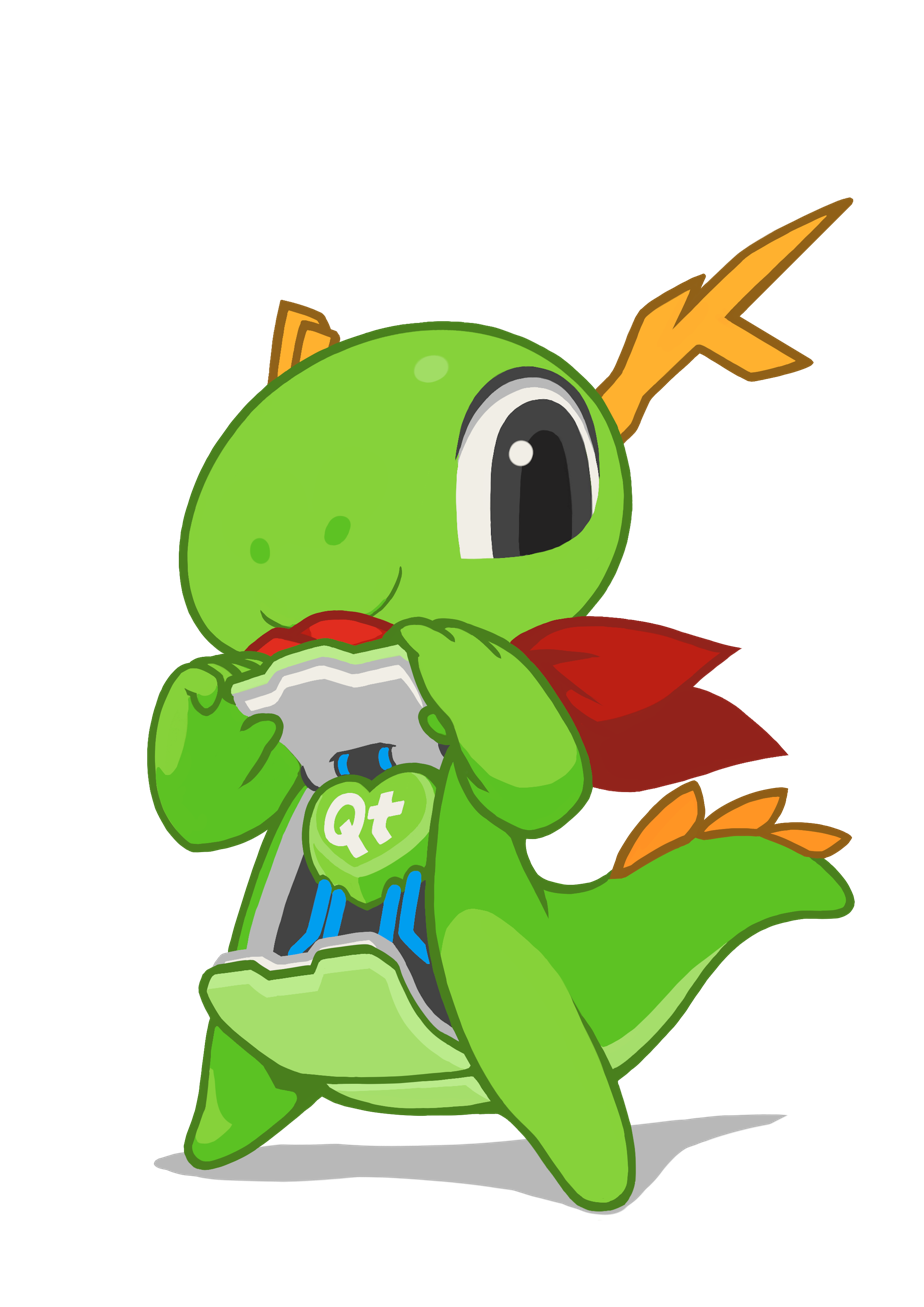
KDE's mascot Konqi

Graphical user-interfaces and desktop environments that utilize Qt/QML as widget toolkit:

- KDE Plasma, a libre desktop environment for various computing devices
- DDE (Deepin Desktop Environment) of Linux Deepin
- UKUI (Ubuntu Kylin User Interface)
- CutefishDE, a desktop environment built with Qt Quick and essential KDE frameworks
- LXQt (Lightweight X11 Desktop Environment)
- Lumina, a desktop environment designed for BSD-based TrueOS
- Lomiri (formerly Unity8), a convergent desktop environment started by Canonical, maintained by Ubports
- Maui Shell, a DE that also features their own app suite
- Unity 2D, a desktop shell written in Qt and QML
- Trinity DE, a continuously developed fork based on KDE3
- SDDM, a display manager written in QML that is compatible with X11 and Wayland.

=== Embedded and mobile UIs ===
- Actively developed or maintained
  - AsteroidOS, an open source operating system designed for smartwatches
  - Avionics, Panasonic's in-flight entertainment system
  - Sailfish OS, a mobile operating system developed by Jolla
  - Plasma Mobile, a touch-based GUI developed by KDE
  - LuneOS, community-driven successor for Palm/HP webOS
  - Nemo Mobile, based on Mer
  - Lomiri, formerly known as Unity8, a phone UI developed by Ubports, originally by Canonical
  - Tesla Model S in-car UI
  - webOS, a multitask operating system from LG for smart devices like TVs and smartwatches
  - Sky Q, the home entertainment system of Sky plc
- Available, but inactive
  - MeeGo handset and tablet UX
  - Qt Extended, a system by Nokia for embedded and mobile devices

=== Applications using Qt ===
Many notable open-source or proprietary cross-platform software are using Qt or QML:

- 010 Editor, a commercial hex editor and text editor for Microsoft Windows, Linux and macOS.
- Ableton Live
- Adobe Photoshop Album
- Adobe Photoshop Elements
- AMD's Radeon Software Crimson Edition driver tool application.
- Audacious, a music player for Linux, other Unix-like operating systems, and Microsoft Windows.
- Audacity, a digital audio editor and recording application (starting with version 4.0).
- Autodesk Fusion
- Autodesk Maya
- Autodesk 3ds Max
- Bitcoin Core, the reference bitcoin implementation. Most bitcoin forks also provide the reference GUI.
- Calibre, ebook collection application
- Celestia, real-time 3D simulator of the entire known universe (Qt only available with v1.7.0)
- CryEngine V editor
- DaVinci Resolve, a video editor
- Dogecoin Core community-driven cryptocurrency software.
- Dolphin (emulator), an emulator for the Wii and GameCube
- Dorico notation software
- Dragonframe stop motion animation software
- EAGLE by CadSoft Computer / Autodesk, an EDA application with schematic capture, PCB layout, auto-router and CAM features
- FreeCAD, free open source parametric 3D CAD modeler
- FreeMat free open source numerical computing environment
- Gambas free open source BASIC integrated development environment
- GCompris educational suite for children
- Google Earth
- GPlates, a plate tectonics visualisation software
- Igor Pro, a data analysis software
- Krita graphics editing and digital painting software
- LMMS, a cross-platform music production software
- LyX, a document processor that follows the 'what you see is what you mean' paradigm
- Mathematica, a mathematical symbolic computation program, sometimes termed a computer algebra system or program, used in many scientific, engineering, mathematical, and computing fields.
- Mixxx, an open-source digital DJ application.
- Monero, a privacy-focused cryptocurrency, implements its official desktop wallet software using Qt.
- MuseScore, an open-source, multiplatform notation software
- OBS, a libre cross-platform screencast software
- Orange data mining suite
- Packet Sender Network Test Utility
- ParaView open-source cross-platform application for interactive, scientific visualization
- PCSX2, a free and open-source cross-platform PlayStation 2 emulator
- qBittorrent cross-platform free and open-source BitTorrent client
- QGIS geographic information system
- Qtractor Audio multitrack recorder and editing software
- QuiteRSS Feed Reader
- Retroshare F2F communication platform
- Roblox Studio a game creation tool used on the Roblox platform
- Scribus desktop publishing software
- Sibelius music composition and notation software
- SoulseekQT, a P2P file-sharing client
- Source 2 engine tools a 3D video game engine developed by Valve
- Spyder, a Python IDE
- Stellarium, a planetarium program
- Subsurface, a software for logging and planning scuba dives initially designed and developed by Linus Torvalds
- SuperCollider, an environment and programming language for real-time audio synthesis and algorithmic composition
- Synergy, a software application for sharing a keyboard and mouse between multiple computers
- TeamViewer, a computer software package for remote control, desktop sharing, online meetings, web conferencing and file transfer between computers
- Telegram, a messaging client available for Windows, Mac and Linux
- VirtualBox OS virtualization software
- VLC media player
- WeChat 4.0
- Wireshark, a packet analyzer
- WPS Office
- XaoS, a real-time fractal zoomer
- XnView MP

=== Organizations using Qt ===
Qt is utilized by a wide range of companies and organizations such as

- AMD
- Blizzard Entertainment
- BMW
- Crytek
- Daimler AG
- DreamWorks
- Electronic Arts
- European Space Agency
- German Air Traffic Control
- HP
- LG
- Lucasfilm
- Microsoft
- Panasonic
- Philips
- Robert Bosch GmbH
- Samsung
- Siemens
- Tesla
- Tomtom
- Valve
- Volvo
- Walt Disney Animation Studios

== Qt software architecture ==
Example of Qt usage in Linux-based systems

=== Qt concepts ===
Qt is built on these key concepts:

==== Complete abstraction of the GUI ====
When first released, Qt used its own paint engine and controls, emulating the look of the different platforms it runs on when it drew its widgets. This made the porting work easier because very few classes in Qt really depended on the target platform; however, this occasionally led to slight discrepancies where that emulation was imperfect. Recent versions of Qt use the native style APIs of the different platforms, on platforms that have a native widget set, to query metrics and draw most controls, and do not suffer from such issues as often. On some platforms (such as MeeGo and KDE) Qt is the native API. Some other portable graphical toolkits have made different design decisions; for example, wxWidgets uses the toolkits of the target platform for its implementations.

==== Signals and slots ====
Signals and slots are a language construct introduced in Qt for communication between objects which makes it easy to implement the observer pattern while avoiding boilerplate code. The concept is that GUI widgets can send signals containing event information which can be received by other controls using special functions known as slots.

==== Metaobject compiler ====
The metaobject compiler, termed moc, is a tool that is run on the sources of a Qt program. It interprets certain macros from the C++ code as annotations, and uses them to generate added C++ code with meta information about the classes used in the program. This meta information is used by Qt to provide programming features not available natively in C++: signals and slots, introspection and asynchronous function calls.

Qt moc does not recognise modules in its preprocessor currently.

==== Language bindings ====
Qt can be used in several programming languages other than C++, such as Python, JavaScript, C# and Rust via language bindings; many languages have bindings for Qt 5 and bindings for Qt 4.

In 2025 Qt Group announced a new "bridging technology" that aimed to re-think the way of interacting with new languages, listing that a proof of concept was being worked on for integrating C#, Rust, Swift, Java/Kotlin, and Python.

=== Qt modules ===
Starting with Qt 4.0 the framework was split into individual modules. With Qt 5.0 the architecture was modularized even further. Qt is now split into essential and add-on modules.

Qt classes by default do not reside in any namespace, but all classes are prefixed with the letter Q. Qt can be configured to be compiled to reside in a user-defined namespace. Qt is entirely provided through header files, and does not currently support C++ modules.

==== Qt essentials ====
Module	Header	Description
Qt Core	<QtCore>	The only required Qt module, containing classes used by other modules, including the meta-object system, concurrency and threading, containers, event system, plugins and I/O facilities.
Qt GUI	<QtGui>	The central GUI module. In Qt 5 this module now depends on OpenGL, but no longer contains any widget classes.
Qt Widgets	<QtWidgets>	Contains classes for classic widget based GUI applications and the QSceneGraph classes. Was split off from QtGui in Qt 5.
Qt QML	<QtQml>	Module for QML and JavaScript languages.
Qt Quick	<QtQuick>	The module for GUI applications written using QML2.
Qt Quick Controls	<QtQuickControls>	Widget like controls for Qt Quick intended mainly for desktop applications.
Qt Quick Layouts	<QtQuickLayouts>	Layouts for arranging items in Qt Quick.
Qt Network	<QtNetwork>	Network abstraction layer. Complete with support for TCP, UDP, HTTP, TLS, SSL (in Qt 4) and SPDY (since Qt 5.3).
Qt Multimedia	<QtMultimedia>	Classes for audio, video, radio and camera functionality.
Qt Multimedia Widgets	<QtMultimediaWidgets>	The widgets from Qt Multimedia.
Qt SQL	<QtSql>	Contains classes for database integration using SQL.
Qt WebEngine	<QtWebEngine>	A new set of Qt Widget and QML webview APIs based on Chromium.
Qt Test	<QtTest>	Classes for unit testing Qt applications and libraries.

==== Qt add-ons ====
Module	Header	Description
Active Qt	<QtActive>	Classes for applications which use ActiveX.
Qt Charts	<QtCharts>	Provides functionality and widgets to plot charts of many kinds
Qt Bluetooth	<QtBluetooth>	Classes accessing Bluetooth hardware.
Qt D-Bus	<QtDBus>	Classes for IPC using the D-Bus protocol.
Qt NFC	<QtNfc>	Classes accessing NFC hardware. Only officially supported on BlackBerry hardware so far (or N9 in the MeeGo port).
Qt OpenGL	<QtOpenGL>	Legacy module containing the OpenGL classes from Qt 4. In Qt 5 the similar functionality in Qt GUI is recommended.
Qt Location	<QtLocation>	Classes for accessing GPS and other location services and for mapping and navigation. Split off from the Qt 4 Mobility module of Qt Location. Supported on Android, BlackBerry, iOS, Linux (using GeoClue), Windows and Sailfish OS.
Qt Quick 3D	<Qt3D>	Classes for rendering 3D models, video games, simulations and 3D user interfaces, with a Qt QML API, into a mixed 2D and 3D scene graph.
Qt Script	<QtScript>	Legacy module for scripting Qt application using ECMAScript/JavaScript. In Qt 5, using similar classes in Qt QML is recommended.
Qt Sensors	<QtSensors>	Classes for accessing various mobile hardware sensors. Used to be part of Qt Mobile in Qt 4. Supported on Android, BlackBerry, iOS, WinRT, Mer and Linux.
Qt Serial Port	<QtSerialPort>	Classes for access to hardware and virtual serial ports. Supported on Windows, Linux and macOS.
Qt WebChannel	<QtWebChannel>	Provides access to Qt objects to HTML/Js over WebSockets.
Qt WebKit	<QtWebKit>	Qt's WebKit implementation and API.
Qt WebKit Widgets	<QtWebKitWidgets>	The widget API for Qt WebKit
Qt WebSockets	<QtWebSockets>	Provides a WebSocket implementation.
Qt XML	<QtXml>	Legacy module containing classes for SAX and DOM style XML APIs. Replaced with QXmlStreamReader and QXmlStreamWriter classes in Qt Core.
Qt XML Patterns	<QtXmlPatterns>	Support for XPath, XQuery, XSLT and XML Schema validation.

=== Editions ===
There are four editions of Qt available: Community, Indie Mobile, Professional and Enterprise. The Community version is under the open source licenses, while the Indie Mobile, Professional and Enterprise versions, which contain additional functionality and libraries, e.g. Enterprise Controls are commercially sold by Qt Group.

=== Supported platforms ===
Qt works on many different platforms; the following are officially supported:

Platform	Description
Linux/Unix
X11	Qt for X Window System (Linux); FreeBSD, NetBSD, OpenBSD, and DragonFly BSD have community support.
Wayland	Qt applications can switch between graphical backends like X and Wayland at load time with the -platform command line option. This allows a seamless transition of Qt applications from X11 to Wayland. SailfishOS uses Wayland only as it does not have X11.
Android	Qt for Android (formerly known as Necessitas).
Embedded Linux	Qt for embedded platforms: personal digital assistant, smartphone, etc. Exists as multiple platforms depending on display technology. DirectFB, LinuxFB and EGLFS (EGL Full Screen).
Microsoft platforms
Windows	Qt for Microsoft Windows 7, 8, 10, and 11, as well as UWP 10
Windows RT	Support for WinRT-based Windows 10 Mobile apps and Windows 10 IoT
Apple platforms
macOS	Qt for Apple macOS; supports applications on Cocoa
iOS	Qt for iOS platforms (iPhone, iPad)
Other embedded platforms
Integrity	Qt for Integrity
QNX	Qt for QNX
VxWorks	Qt for VxWorks. Only available under a proprietary (commercial) license. Qt 5.5.
QT for MCUs	QT for MCUs

After Nokia opened the Qt source code to the community on Gitorious, various ports appeared. There are also some ports of Qt that may be available, but are not supported anymore. These platforms are listed in List of platforms supported by Qt. See also there for current community support for other lesser known platforms, such as SailfishOS.

=== Licensing ===
Qt is available under the following free software licenses: GPL 2.0, GPL 3.0, LGPL 3.0 and LGPL 2.1 (with Qt special exception). Note that some modules are available only under a GPL license, which means that applications which link to these modules need to comply with that license.

In addition, Qt has always been available under a commercial license, like the Qt Commercial License, that allows developing proprietary applications with no restrictions on licensing.

=== Qt tools ===
Qt comes with its own set of tools to ease cross-platform development, which can otherwise be cumbersome due to different set of development tools.

Qt Creator is a cross-platform IDE for C++ and QML. Qt Designer's GUI layout/design functionality is integrated into the IDE, although Qt Designer can still be started as a standalone tool.

In addition to Qt Creator, Qt provides qmake, a cross-platform build script generation tool that automates the generation of Makefiles for development projects across different platforms. There are other tools available in Qt, including the Qt Designer interface builder and the Qt Assistant help browser (which are both embedded in Qt Creator), the Qt Linguist translation tool, uic (user interface compiler), and moc (Meta-Object Compiler).

== History of Qt ==
=== Early developments ===
In the summer of 1990, Haavard Nord and Eirik Chambe-Eng (the original developers of Qt and the CEO and President, respectively, of Qt Group) were working together on a database application for ultrasound images written in C++ and running on the classic Mac OS, Unix, and Microsoft Windows. They began development of "Qt" in 1991, three years before the company was incorporated as Quasar Technologies, then changed the name to Troll Tech and then to Trolltech.

The toolkit was called Qt because the letter Q looked appealing in Haavard's Emacs typeface, and "t" was inspired by Xt, the X toolkit.

The first two versions of Qt had only two flavors: Qt/X11 for Unix and Qt/Windows for Windows.

On 20 May 1995 Trolltech publicly released Qt 0.90 for X11/Linux with the source code under the Qt Free Edition License. This license was viewed as not compliant with the free software definition by Free Software Foundation because, while the source was available, it did not allow the redistribution of modified versions. Trolltech used this license until version 1.45. Controversy erupted around 1998 when it became clear that the K Desktop Environment was going to become one of the leading desktop environments for Linux. As it was based on Qt, many people in the free software movement worried that an essential piece of one of their major operating systems would be proprietary.

The Windows platform was available only under a proprietary license, which meant free/open source applications written in Qt for X11 could not be ported to Windows without purchasing the proprietary edition.

=== Becoming free software–friendly ===
With the release of version 2.0 of the toolkit in mid-1999, the license was changed to the Q Public License (QPL), a free software license, but one regarded by the Free Software Foundation as incompatible with the GPL. Compromises were sought between KDE and Trolltech whereby Qt would not be able to fall under a more restrictive license than the QPL, even if Trolltech was bought out or went bankrupt. This led to the creation of the KDE Free Qt foundation, which guarantees that Qt would fall under a BSD-style license should no free/open source version of Qt be released during 12 months.

In 2000, Qt/X11 2.2 was released under the GPL v2, ending all controversy regarding GPL compatibility.

At the end of 2001, Trolltech released Qt 3.0, which added support for Mac OS X (now known as macOS). The Mac OS X support was available only in the proprietary license until June 2003, when Trolltech released Qt 3.2 with Mac OS X support available under the GPL.

In 2002, members of the KDE on Cygwin project began porting the GPL licensed Qt/X11 code base to Windows. This was in response to Trolltech's refusal to license Qt/Windows under the GPL on the grounds that Windows was not a free/open source software platform. The project achieved some success although it never reached production quality.

This was resolved when Trolltech released Qt 4.0 also for Windows under the GPL in June 2005. Qt 4 supported the same set of platforms in the free software/open source editions as in the proprietary edition, so it is possible, with Qt 4.0 and later releases, to create GPL-licensed free/open source applications using Qt on all supported platforms. The GPL v3 with special exception was later added as an added licensing option. The GPL exception allows the final application to be licensed under various GPL-incompatible free software/open source licenses such as the Mozilla Public License 1.1.

=== Acquisition by Nokia ===
Nokia acquired Trolltech ASA on 17 June 2008 and changed the name first to Qt Software, then to Qt Development Frameworks.

Nokia focused on turning Qt into the main development platform for its devices, including a port to the Symbian S60 platform. Version 1.0 of the Nokia Qt SDK was released on 23 June 2010. The source code was made available over Gitorious, a community oriented git source code repository, with a goal of creating a broader community using and improving Qt.

On 14 January 2009, Qt version 4.5 added another option, the LGPL, to make Qt more attractive for both non-GPL open source projects and closed applications.

In February 2011, Nokia announced its decision to discontinue Symbian technologies and base their future smartphones on the Windows Phone platform instead (and since then support for that platform has also been dropped). One month later, Nokia announced the sale of Qt's commercial licensing and professional services to Digia, with the immediate goal of taking Qt support to Android, iOS and Windows 8 platforms, and to continue focusing on desktop and embedded development, although Nokia was to remain the main development force behind the framework at that time.

=== Merging and demerging with Digia ===
In March 2011, Nokia sold the commercial licensing part of Qt to Digia, creating Qt Commercial. In August 2012, Digia announced that it would acquire Qt from Nokia. The Qt team at Digia started their work in September 2012. They released Qt 5.0 within a month and newer versions every six months with new features and additional supported platforms.

In September 2014, Digia transferred the Qt business and copyrights to their wholly owned subsidiary, The Qt Company, which owns 25 brands related to Qt. In May 2016, Digia and Qt demerged completely into two independent companies, forming Qt Group.

=== The Qt Project and open governance ===
Qt 5 was officially released on 19 December 2012. This new version marked a major change in the platform, with hardware-accelerated graphics, QML and JavaScript playing a major role. The traditional C++-only QWidgets continued to be supported, but did not benefit from the performance improvements available through the new architecture. Qt 5 brings significant improvements to the speed and ease of developing user interfaces.

Framework development of Qt 5 moved to open governance at qt-project.org, which made it possible for developers outside Digia to submit patches for review.

=== Qt contributors ===
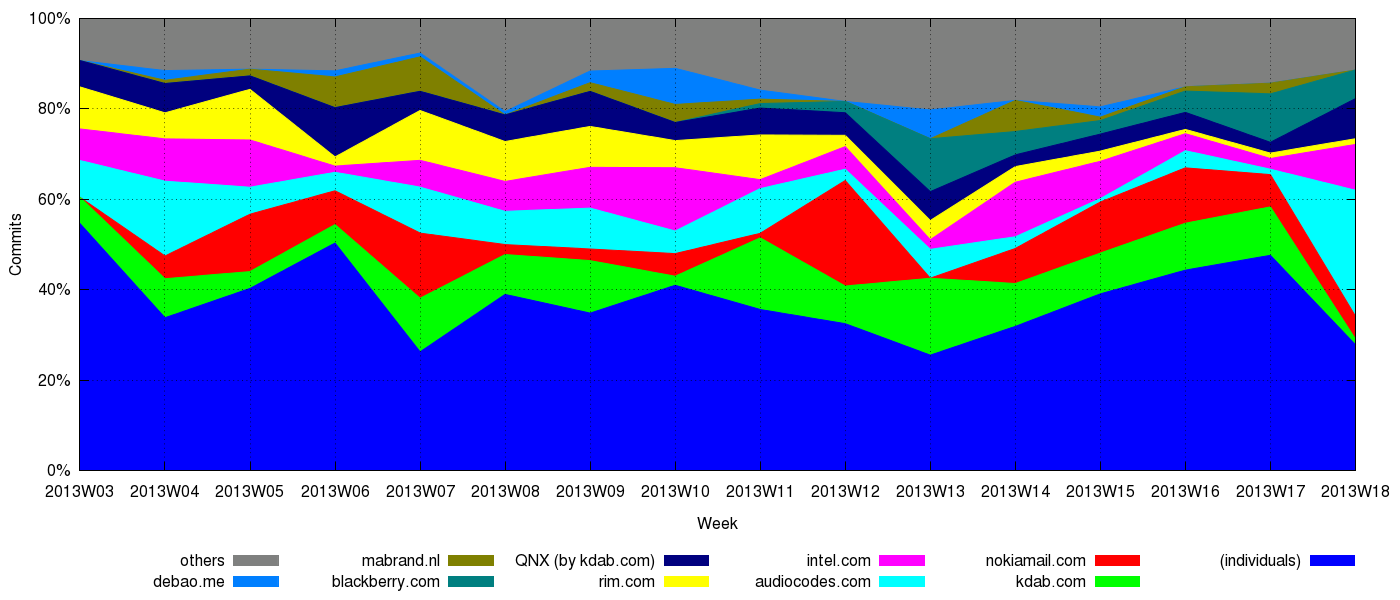
Distribution of non-Digia Qt contributors (2013, Week 18)

Aside from Qt Group, many organizations and individuals using Qt as their development platform participate in the open development of Qt via the Qt Project.

One such Qt contributor is Klarälvdalens Datakonsult AB, a Swedish Qt consulting company. KDAB is involved in many areas, including maintenance of several components.

Together with RIM/BlackBerry, KDAB is maintaining the QNX and BlackBerry 10 ports of Qt.

Another participator is Intel, contributing for example Wayland support. AudioCodes maintains IBM ClearCase support in Qt Creator.

As a heavy user of Qt, the KDE project submits many patches and features from its developer library KDE Frameworks back to Qt.

== See also ==
- List of open-source application frameworks
- List of widget toolkits
- Android software development
- iOS SDK
- Wt (web toolkit)

== Bibliography ==
Qt Wiki provides a comprehensive list of English books about Qt. This is a list of notable books:

- Schlee, Max (19 July 2026). Qt 6.9 Professional Programming with C++ (1st ed.). qt-book.com. ISBN 978-3982908403.
- Bocklage-Ryannel, Juergen; Thelin, Johan (12 May 2015). "Qt 5 Cadaques" (1st ed.).
- Blanchette, Jasmin; Summerfield, Mark (14 February 2008). C++ GUI Programming with Qt 4 (2nd ed.). Prentice Hall. ISBN 978-0-13-235416-5.
- Summerfield, Mark (23 August 2010). Advanced Qt Programming: Creating Great Software with C++ and Qt 4 (1st ed.). Addison-Wesley. ISBN 978-0-321-63590-7.
- Fitzek, Frank H. P.; Mikkonen, Tommi; Torp, Tony (17 May 2010). Qt for Symbian (1st ed.). Wiley. ISBN 978-0-470-75010-0. Archived from the original on 19 December 2009.
- Summerfield, Mark (28 October 2007). Rapid GUI Programming with Python and Qt (1st ed.). Prentice Hall. ISBN 978-0-13-235418-9.
- Molkentin, Daniel (19 July 2007). The Book of Qt 4: The Art of Building Qt Applications (1st ed.). No Starch Press. ISBN 978-1-59327-147-3. Archived from the original on 26 June 2015.
- Thelin, Johan (3 August 2007). Foundations of Qt Development (1st ed.). Apress. ISBN 978-1-59059-831-3. Archived from the original on 20 January 2015.
- Dalheimer, Matthias (January 2002). Programming with Qt (2nd ed.). O'Reilly Media. ISBN 978-0-596-00064-6.
- Ezust, Alan; Ezust, Paul (10 September 2006). An Introduction to Design Patterns in C++ with Qt 4 (2nd ed.). Prentice Hall. ISBN 978-0-13-187905-8.
