= ReMarkable =

Electronic writer tablet

reMarkable RM100
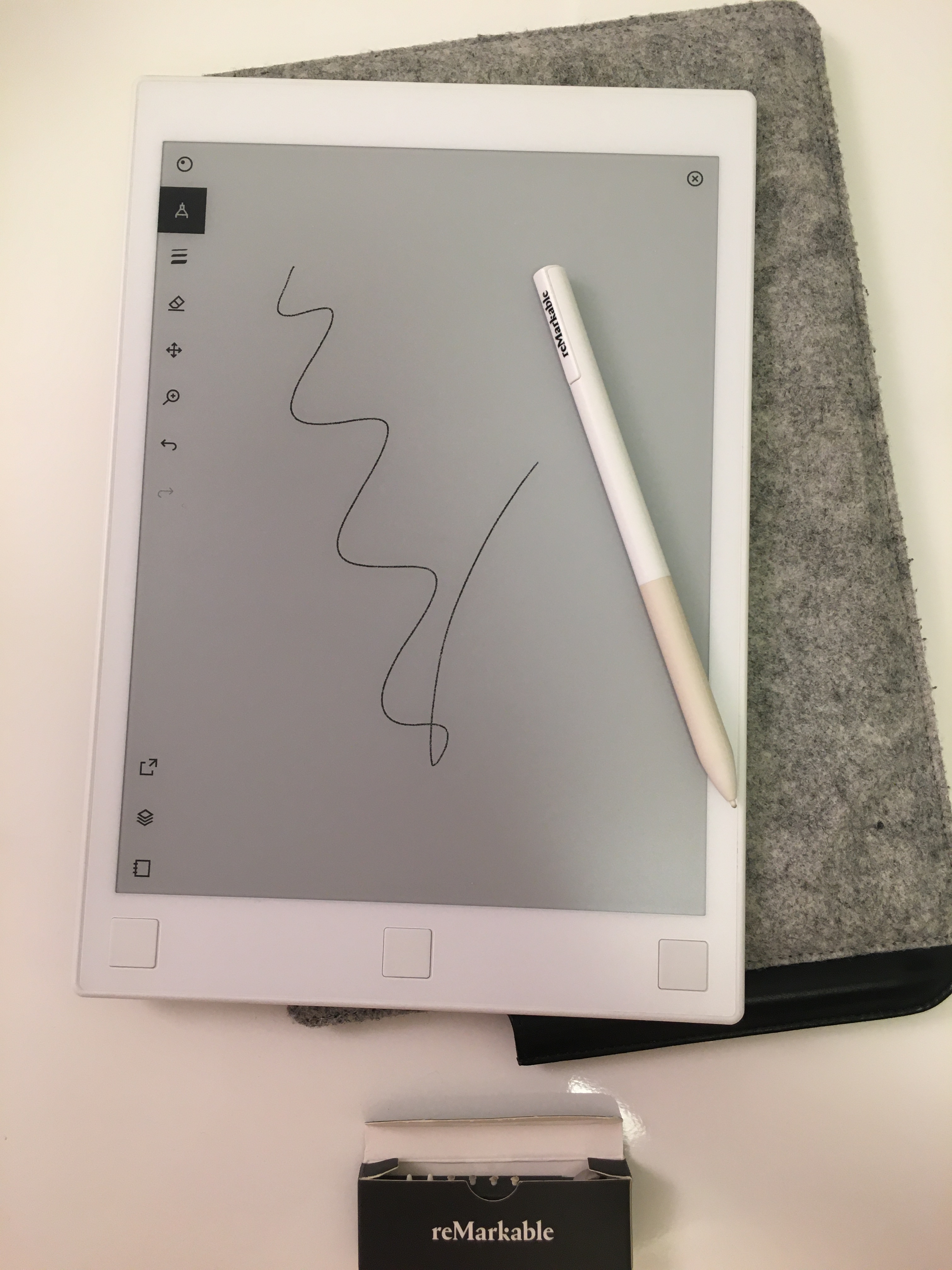
- First generation reMarkable tablet with sleeve and pen
- Manufacturer: reMarkable
- Type: e-reader
- Display: E-Ink
- Website: remarkable.com

reMarkable is a range of E Ink writing tablet for reading documents and textbooks, sketching and note-taking that attempts to fully replicate paper writing. Developed by a Norwegian startup company of the same name, the devices are geared towards students, academics and professionals.

reMarkable uses electronic paper reading displays and tablet computer writing system.

== Writing Tablets ==
=== Current ===
==== Paper Pure ====
Medium sized device with greyscale display. Replaces Remarkable 2.

==== Paper Pro ====
Large format colour device with reading light

==== Paper Pro Move ====
Smallest tablet in the range, featuring a colour display and front light

=== Discontinued ===
==== ReMarkable 2 ====
An iteration on its predecessor, it was marketed as the 'World's Thinnest Tablet'. The reMarkable 2 was discontinued in May 2026, although reMarkable stated that the device would continue to receive software updates and that accessories would remain available.

==== ReMarkable ====
The original product. Features greyscale display.

Legend:	Unsupported	Discontinued	Current

Name	Model	Display			Storage	CPU	RAM	Connectivity	Stylus	Dimensions	Weight	Battery	Released
		Type	Size	Resolution	Internal	Make and model		USB +		H x W x D			
ReMarkable	RM100	E-ink	10.3"	1872 × 1404	8 GB	1 GHz ARM A9	512 MB	USB microB	Unpowered	256 × 177 x 6.7 mm	350 g	3000 mAh	Late 2017
ReMarkable 2	RM110	E-ink	10.3"	1872 × 1404	8 GB	1.2 GHz Dual Core ARM A9	1 GB	USB-C	Unpowered	246 x 187 x 4.7 mm	403 g	3000 mAh	March 2020
Paper Pure		E-ink	10.3"	1872 × 1404	32 GB	1.7 GHz Dual Core ARM A55	2 GB	USB-C		228 x 187 x 6 mm	360 g	3820 mAh	May 2026
Paper Pro		E-ink Gallery 3	11.8"	2160 x 1620	64 GB	1.8 GHz quad-core Cortex A53	2 GB	USB-C		274.1 x 196.6 x 5.1 mm	525 g	5030 mAh	September 2024
Paper Pro Move		E-ink Gallery 3	7.3"	1696 x 954	64 GB	1.7 GHz Dual Core ARM A55	2 GB	USB-C		195.6 x 107.8 x 6.5 mm	230 g	2334 mAh	September 2025

== Operating system ==
ReMarkable uses its own operating system, named Codex. Codex is based on Linux and is optimized for electronic paper display technology.

=== Community support ===
As Codex is based on Linux and an open source ecosystem, it has gained community projects and 3rd party software for it. The device is accessible through SSH, allowing the installation of 3rd party software. Many packages are accessible through Toltec, a community-maintained free software repository. The Cloud system has been reverse engineered and an open source alternative has been created.

=== Alternative operating systems ===
An alternative free operating system, Parabola-rM, has been made to replace Codex. Parabola-rM aims to turn the device into a full-fledged computer, allowing typical desktop Linux applications to be run, with the caveat that this is not a supported configuration.

== Reception ==
Of the first generation of the tablet, Remarkable 1 (or ReMarkable RM100 as known by its model number), launched in late 2017, suffered some criticism due to sluggishness when loading and unloading files.

The Bad Voltage podcast stated that the lack of integrations with other software limits the device's usefulness for taking notes for some users, and there is no official third-party app ecosystem, but the ability to add software via unofficial hacks offers interesting possibilities.

The second generation Remarkable 2 was released in May 2020, and a review by Wired, stated it "excels at taking your handwritten notes, but it doesn't do much else well." Other media outlets have seen the lack of a distraction or ability to do much else as positives.

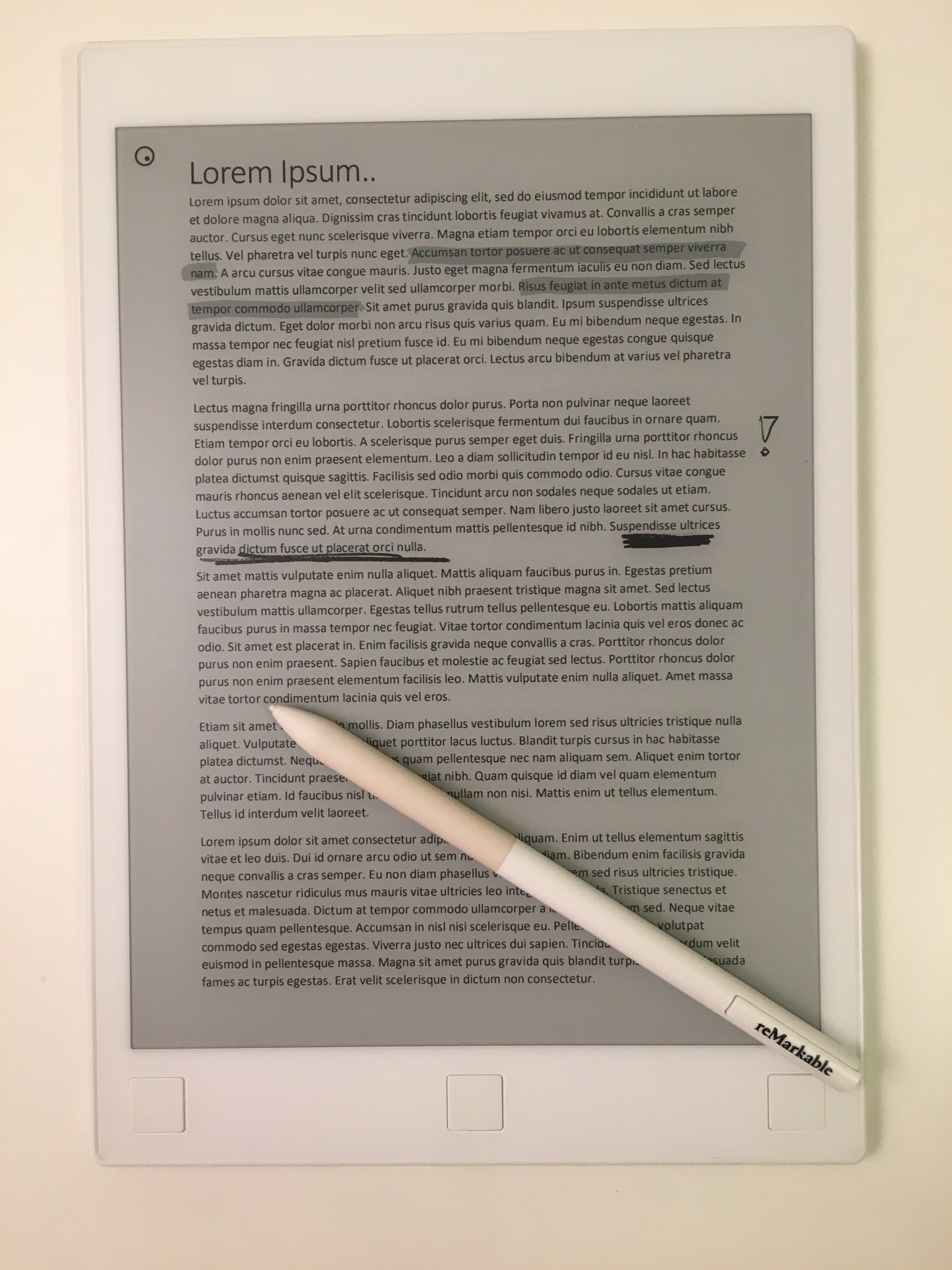
A PDF file on the reMarkable annotated with the passive pen

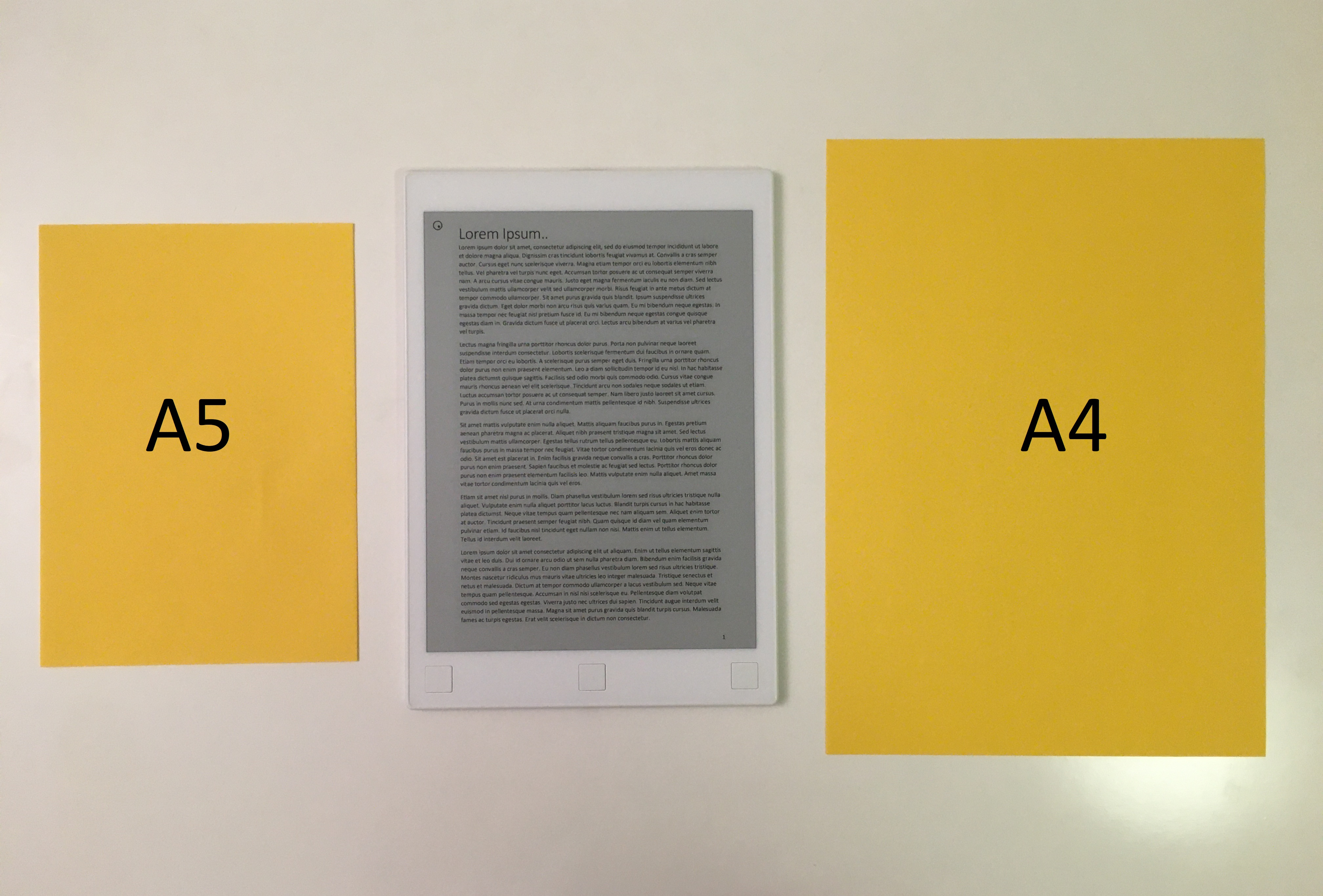
Size of the reMarkable tablet compared to A4 and A5 sheets of paper

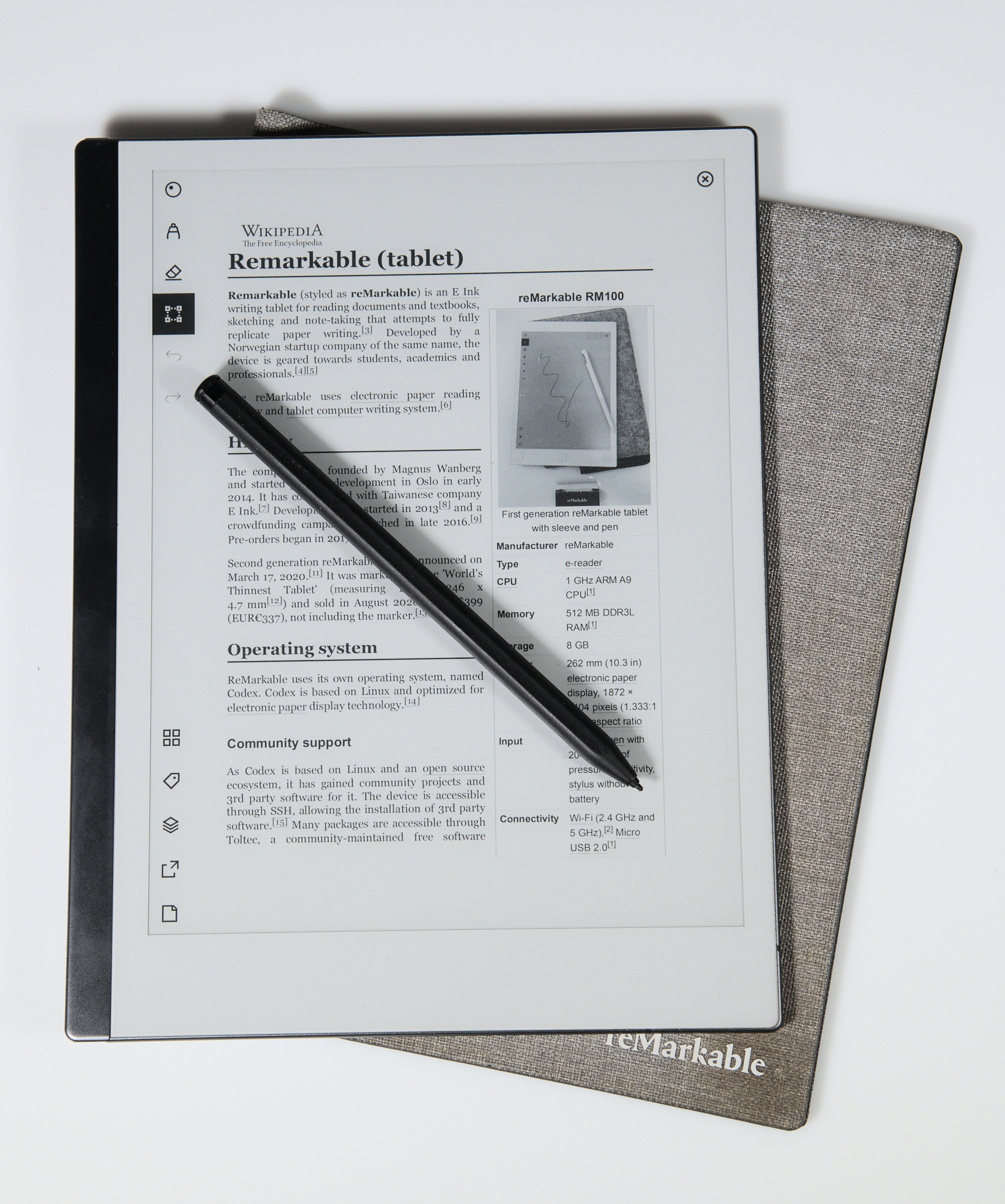
Second generation reMarkable 2 with Wikipedia Article about reMarkable

== See also ==
- Comparison of e-readers
