= Qt Creator =

QT development environment

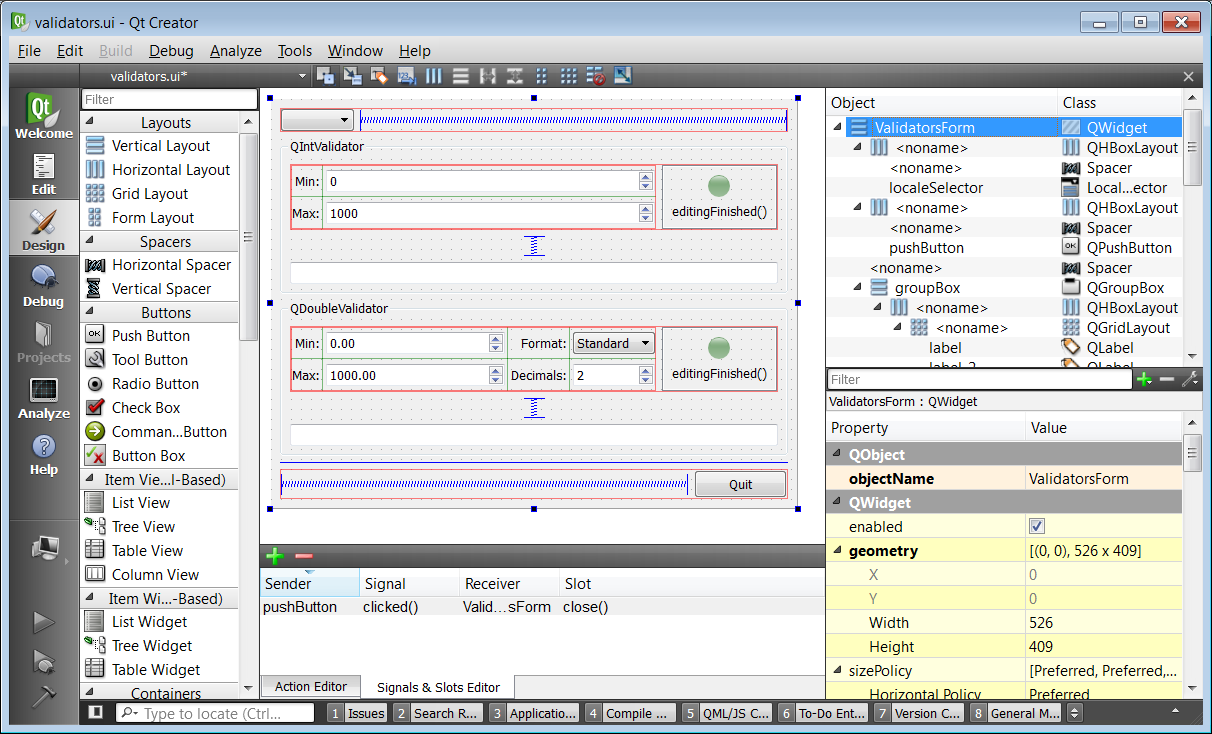
- Screenshot of Qt Creator 3.1.1 designing a user interface
- Developer: Qt Project
- Stable release: 19.0.1 / 23 April 2026; 5 days ago
- Written in: C++ (Qt)
- Operating system: Linux, macOS, BSD family, Windows
- Type: Integrated development environment; GUI builder
- License: GPL-3.0-only with Qt-GPL-exception-1.0
- Website: www.qt.io/product/development-tools
- Repository: code.qt.io/cgit/qt-creator/qt-creator.git/

Qt Creator is a cross-platform C++, JavaScript, Python and QML integrated development environment (IDE) which simplifies GUI application development. It is part of the SDK for the Qt GUI application development framework and uses the Qt API, which encapsulates host OS GUI function calls. It includes a visual debugger and an integrated WYSIWYG GUI layout and forms designer. The editor has features such as syntax highlighting and autocompletion. Qt Creator uses the C++ compiler from the GNU Compiler Collection on Linux. On Windows it can use MinGW or MSVC with the default install and can also use Microsoft Console Debugger when compiled from source code. Clang is also supported.

== History ==
Development of what would eventually become Qt Creator had begun by 2007 or earlier under transitional names Workbench and later Project Greenhouse. It debuted during the later part of the Qt 4 era, starting with the release of Qt Creator, version 1.0 in March 2009 and subsequently bundled with Qt 4.5 in SDK 2009.3.

This was at a time when the standalone Qt Designer application was still the widget layout tool of choice for developers. There is no indication that Creator had layout capability at this stage. The record is somewhat muddied on this point (perhaps due to changes in ownership or the emphasis on Qt Quick), but the integration of Qt Designer under Qt Creator is first mentioned at least as early as Qt 4.7 (ca. late 2011). In the Qt 5 era, it is simply stated that "[Qt Designer's] functionality is now included as part of [sic] Qt Creator IDE."

== Projects ==
Qt Creator includes a project manager that can use a variety of project formats such as .pro, CMake, Autotools and others. A project file can contain information such as what files are included into the project, custom build steps and settings for running the applications.

== Editors ==
Qt Creator includes a code editor and integrates Qt Designer for designing and building graphical user interfaces (GUIs) from Qt widgets.

The code editor in Qt Creator supports syntax highlighting for various languages. In addition to that, the code editor can parse code in C++ and QML languages and as a result code completion, context-sensitive help, semantic navigation are provided.

Qt Designer is a tool for designing and building graphical user interfaces (GUIs) from Qt widgets. It is possible to compose and customize the widgets or dialogs and test them using different styles and resolutions directly in the editor. Widgets and forms created with Qt Designer are integrated with programmed code, using the Qt signals and slots mechanism.

Qt Quick Designer is a tool for developing animations by using a declarative programming language QML.

== Targets ==
Qt Creator provides support for building and running Qt applications for desktop environments (Windows, Linux, FreeBSD and macOS), mobile devices (Android, BlackBerry, iOS, Maemo, and MeeGo) and embedded Linux devices. Build settings allow the user to switch between build targets, different Qt versions and build configurations. For mobile device targets, Qt Creator can generate an installation package, install it to a mobile device that is attached to the development computer and run it there.

== Tools ==
Qt Creator is integrated with a set of tools, such as version control systems and Qt Simulator.

The following version control systems are supported:

- Git
- Subversion
- Perforce
- Bazaar
- CVS
- Mercurial

Qt Simulator is a tool for testing Qt applications that are intended for mobile devices in an environment similar to that of the device.

== Debuggers ==
Qt Creator uses external native debuggers to debug the C++ language. Qt Creator displays the raw information provided by the native debuggers in a simplified manner.

Debuggers supported are:

- GNU Symbolic Debugger (GDB)
- Microsoft Console Debugger (CDB)
- Internal JavaScript debugger
- LLVM debugger (LLDB)

== See also ==
- List of integrated development environments
- Linux on the desktop
- Glade Interface Designer – a GUI builder for GTK
- Human interface guidelines
