= Nokia Internet Tablet =

Type of tablet computer

The Nokia Internet Tablet is a discontinued line of Nokia mobile Internet appliances products. These tablets fall in the range between a personal digital assistant (PDA) and an Ultra-Mobile PC (UMPC), and slightly below Intel's Mobile Internet device (MID).

== Early trials and predecessors ==
Nokia had plans for the Internet Tablet series since before 2000. An early model was test manufactured in 2001, the Nokia M510, which was running on EPOC and featuring an Opera browser, speakers and a 10-inch 800x600 screen, but it was not released because of fears that the market was not ready for it. The M510 was first leaked to the public in 2014.

Prior to the introduction of Nokia's Internet tablets, Nokia unveiled two "media devices" in 2003-04 which were mobile phones but had a form factor similar to the Internet tablets that followed them. The first of this type of device was the Nokia 7700 which was intended for mass production but ended up being canned in favor of the Nokia 7710 which had a slightly more traditional form-factor and better specs.

== Maemo ==
Nokia Internet Tablets run the Debian Linux-based Maemo, which draws much of its GUI, frameworks, and libraries from the GNOME project. It uses the embedded-targeted Matchbox as its window manager and uses Hildon, a lightweight GTK-based toolkit designed for handheld devices, as its GUI and application framework.

== Alternative distributions ==
Maemo can be replaced entirely by a number of other Linux distributions.

- NITdroid is a port of Google's Android.
- Ubuntu has been ported.
- Mer is a new distribution created by combining Ubuntu with the open source packages from Maemo.
- Gentoo an unofficial port of Gentoo Linux is available.

== Models ==
Model	Processor	Memory (RAM)	Storage (flash)	Display	Operating system version	Connectivity	Memory card	Power	Weight, dimensions	Retail availability
770	ARM TI OMAP1710 (252 MHz)	64 MB	128 MB	800 x 480 (16-bit)	OS2005/6, OS2007/8HE	MiniUSB, 802.11g, Bluetooth 1.2	1 RS-MMC slot II	BP-5L Li-Po 1500 mAh	230 g, 141x79x19 mm	November 2005
N800	ARM TI OMAP2420 (400 MHz) (originally under-clocked to (330 MHz) in OS2007)	128 MB	256 MB	800 x 480 (16-bit)	OS2007/8	MiniUSB OTG, 802.11g, Bluetooth 2.0	2 x SD slots with SDHC	BP-5L Li-Po 1500 mAh	206 g, 144x75x13(/18) mm	January 2007
N810	ARM TI OMAP2420 (400 MHz)	128 MB	256 MB + 2 GB internal	800 x 480 (16-bit)	OS2008	MicroUSB OTG, 802.11g, Bluetooth 2.0	1 x MiniSD slot with SDHC	BP-4L Li-Po 1500 mAh	226 g, 128x72x14 mm	October 2007
N810 WiMAX Edition	ARM TI OMAP2420 (400 MHz)	128 MB	256 MB + 2 GB internal	800 x 480 (16-bit)	OS2008	MicroUSB OTG, 802.11g, Bluetooth 2.0, WiMAX	1 x MiniSD slot with SDHC	BP-4L Li-Po 1500 mAh	229 g, 128x72x16 mm	April 2008
N900 (not marketed as an Internet Tablet)	ARM TI OMAP3430 (600 MHz)	256 MB	256 MB + 32 GB internal	800 x 480 (16-bit)	Maemo 5	MicroUSB, 802.11b/g, Bluetooth 2.1, AV connector 3.5 mm, TV-out, FM transmitter, GPS	1 x microSD slot with SDHC	BL-5J 1320 mAh	181 g, 110.9×59.8×18 mm	November 2009
N9 and N950 (neither marketed as an Internet Tablet)	ARM TI OMAP 3630 (1 GHz)	1 GB (mobile DDR)	512 MB internal + 16 or 64 GB on board	"Clear Black" AMOLED 854 × 480 px (FWVGA), 3.9" (99.1 mm), 16.7 m colors (24 bits)	MeeGo 1.2 "Harmattan"	NFC, Bluetooth 2.1 +EDR, MicroUSB 2.0, Wi-Fi, Micro SIM card, AV connector 3.5 mm	no memory card slot	BV-5JW 1450 mAh Li-ion battery (removable by service)	135 g, 116.45x61.2x12.1 mm	September 2011

== See also ==
- Internet appliance
- Mobile Internet device
- Tablet computer
- WiMAX
- CrunchPad
- SmartQ 5
- Nokia N1
- Nokia Lumia 2520
- Nokia T20
