= Mer (software distribution) =

Free and open-source software distribution

- OS family: Linux
- Working state: Discontinued (merged with Sailfish OS)
- Source model: Open source
- Marketing target: Mobile
- Package manager: RPM Package Manager
- Supported platforms: ARM, x86 and MIPS
- Kernel type: None (not shipped with Mer)
- License: None imposed (packages use L/GPL, BSD and MIT licenses)
- Official website: merproject.org

Mer is middleware; it lacks the Linux kernel and also lacks a UI like Plasma Mobile

Mer is a discontinued free and open-source software distribution, targeted at hardware vendors to serve as a middleware for Linux kernel-based mobile-oriented operating systems. It is a fork of MeeGo.

== Goals ==
Some goals of the project are:

- Openly developed with transparency built into the fabric of the project
- Provide a mobile device oriented architecture
- Primary customers are mobile device vendors, not end-users.
- Have structure, processes and tools to make life easy for device manufacturers
- Support innovation in the mobile OS space
- Inclusive of projects and technologies (e.g. MeeGo, Tizen, Qt, Enlightenment Foundation Libraries (EFL), HTML5)
- Governed as a meritocracy
- Run as a non profit through donations

== Software architecture ==
Mer contains systemd, Wayland compositor, etc.

Mer is not an operating system; it is aimed to be one component of an operating system based on the Linux kernel. Mer is a part of the operating system above the Linux kernel and below the graphical user interface (GUI).

Mer just provides the equivalent of the MeeGo core. The former MeeGo user interfaces and hardware adaptation are to be done by various other projects and by hardware manufacturers, which will be able to build their products on top of the Mer core.

=== Components ===
There is support for systemd, Wayland, Hybris, and other current FOSS software.

Zephyr is an attempt at creating a stack for use by other projects to be exploring lightweight, high-performance, next-generation UIs based on Mer, Qt5, QML Compositor and Wayland.

Weston 1.3, which was released on 11 October 2013, supports libhybris, making it possible to use Android device drivers with Wayland.

== Supported hardware ==
Mer can be compiled for a number of instruction sets such as x86, ARM or MIPS.

There are Mer-based builds available for various devices, including Raspberry Pi, Beagleboard, Nokia N900, Nokia N950, Nokia N9 and for various Intel Atom-based tablets. These also include hardware adaptation packages and various UXes running on top of Mer, provided by different projects. They can be flashed on the device and might work in dual-boot mode with the original firmware.

Mer uses Open Build Service: OBS in mer but with one repository per architecture:

Mer port name	OBS scheduler name	RPM architectures	OBS project name in MDS	OBS repository name in MDS	Description
i486	i586	i486	Core:i486	Core_i486	Generic i486+ X86 port
i586	i586	i586, i686	Core:i586	Core_i586	SSSE3 enabled X86 port
x86_64	x86_64	x86_64	Core:x86_64	Core_x86_64	Generic 64 bit port
armv6l	armv7el	armv6l	Core:armv6l	Core_armv6l	ARMv6 + VFP port
armv7l	armv7el	armv7l	Core:armv7l	Core_armv7l	ARMv7 VFPv3-D16 port, softfp ABI
armv7hl	armv8el	armv7hl	Core:armv7hl	Core_armv7hl	ARMv7 VFPv3-D16 port, hardfp ABI
armv7tnhl	armv8el	armv7hl, armv7nhl, armv7tnhl, armv7thl	Core:armv7tnhl	Core_armv7tnhl	ARMv7 VFPv3-D16 port, hardfp ABI, NEON, Thumb2
mipsel	mips	mipsel	Core:mipsel	Core_mipsel	MIPS32 O32 ABI port, hardfloat

== Products based on Mer ==
=== KDE Plasma Active ===
Mer was used as a reference platform for KDE's Plasma Active.

==== Vivaldi Tablet and Improv-computer ====
In January 2012 a Plasma Active-tablet device, initially known as 'Spark tablet' and soon renamed 'Vivaldi Tablet', was announced. Based on the Allwinner A20 SoC, it would have a 7" multitouch display, run the Plasma Active user interface on top of Mer, and have a target price of about €200. The project encountered some problems when its hardware partner in China completely changed the internal components and was reluctant to release the kernel source for the new hardware. As of early July 2012, the Vivaldi had been set back, but a solution was "in the pipes", according to Plasma developer Aaron Seigo. As a kind of side project Improv-computer was targeted for developers and was to be released in January 2014, Mer preinstalled. In mid 2014 both projects were discontinued.

=== Nemo Mobile ===
Parallel to Sailfish OS by Jolla, Nemo Mobile is a community-driven operating system based on a Linux kernel, Mer, a GUI and diverse applications. Since 2019, Nemo Mobile is no longer using Mer Project as a base but switched to Manjaro Linux. The main reason for the move was obsolete components, like Qt version 5.6 due to licensing restrictions. Contrary to Sailfish OS using Hybris, Nemo Mobile uses Halium (which includes Hybris).

=== Jolla and Sailfish OS ===
In July 2012 Jolla, a Finnish company founded by former Nokia employees involved in MeeGo development, announced their work on a new operating system called Sailfish OS, which is based on MeeGo and Mer's core with added proprietary GUI and hardware implementation layers. It was presented in late November 2012. Jolla released its first smartphone using Sailfish in 2013, simply called Jolla. In October 2014 Jolla announced for May 2015 the Jolla Tablet with Sailfish OS 2.0 which is to be 64-bit on quadcore Intel CPU. Also 2.0 is ready for licensing, hence it is used with products like Aqua Fish by Intex and PuzzlePhone.

=== Yuanxin OS ===
In November 2014, Yuanxin Technology in China announced it is working on Yuanxin OS. The company's president Shi Wenyong called the OS "China's own smartphone OS", to be on par with Android and Apple iOS. Shi explained to a reporter that Yuanxin OS is based on the Mer distribution.

== History ==
Relations of Mer and the mobile operating systems incorporating it and also of the projects it was forked from.

Mer's initial aim to provide a completely free alternative to the Maemo operating system, which was able to run on Nokia Internet Tablets such as the N800 and N810 (collectively known as the N8x0 devices).

It was based on Ubuntu 9.04, and with the release of Maemo 5/Fremantle, a new goal emerged: "[To bring] as much of Fremantle as we can get on the N8x0."

=== Shift to MeeGo ===
Mer suspended development at release 0.17, since focus had switched to building MeeGo for the N800 and N810 devices. By then, MeeGo was available and supported by a much wider community.

=== Collapse of MeeGo ===
The development was silently resumed during the summer of 2011 by a handful of MeeGo developers (some of them previously active in the Mer project), after Nokia changed its strategy in February 2011. These developers were not satisfied with the way MeeGo had been governed behind closed doors especially after Nokia departed, and they were also concerned that MeeGo heavily depended on big companies which could stop supporting it, as was the case when Nokia abandoned MeeGo as part of its new strategy.

This was again proven to be a problem after Intel, Samsung and the Linux Foundation announced they were going to create a new operating system called Tizen. This new OS began focusing on HTML5 and using the Enlightenment Foundation Libraries (EFL) instead of Qt for native applications. However, on May 14, 2014 it was announced that Tizen:Common would be bringing Qt back by starting to ship with it integrated.

=== Revival with "MeeGo Reconstructed" ===
After the Tizen project was announced, the revival of the Mer project was announced on the MeeGo mailing list, with the promise that it would be developed and governed completely in the open as a meritocracy, unlike MeeGo and Tizen. It would also be based on the MeeGo code base and tools, aiming to provide just the equivalent of the MeeGo core with no default UI. The APIs for third party application development are included, meaning that Qt, EFL, and HTML5 would be supported on the platform, and maybe even others if widely requested.

The project quickly started to gain traction among many open source developers who had been involved in MeeGo, and it started being used by former MeeGo projects, such as the reference handset UX, now rebased on top of Mer and called Nemo Mobile, and a couple of projects targeting tablet UXes such as Cordia (a reimplementation of the Maemo 5 Hildon UX) and Plasma Active emerged on top of Mer. Equivalent Mer-based project of the former MeeGo IVI and Smart TV UXes are not yet known to exist.

The aim of the Mer community is to create, in a solid way, what had been unable to be done with MeeGo; Mer is to become what MeeGo was expected to be but has not become. Mer aims to become the MeeGo 2.0 when the Linux Foundation finds that it complies with all of the MeeGo requirements.

=== Merger with Sailfish ===
In early 2019 it was announced that they would unify Mer and Sailfish operations under one brand, called Sailfish OS, discontinuing use of the name Mer.

== See also ==
- Comparison of mobile operating systems
