= Modest (email client) =

Open-source email client

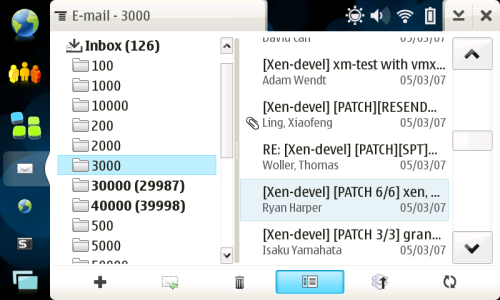
- Modest on Internet Tablet OS 2008
- Developer: maemo project
- Release: December 11, 2007; 18 years ago
- Stable release: 1.0-2008.35-1 / September 29, 2008; 17 years ago
- Written in: C
- Operating system: Internet Tablet OS
- Type: Email client
- License: BSD-like license Tinymail under LGPL
- Website: github.com/maemo-leste/modest

Modest is a free, open-source, email client developed by Nokia's maemo project. Small and lightweight, it is intended for use on hardware with “modest” resources, in particular Nokia's N800 and N810 Internet Tablets running Internet Tablet OS 2008, as well as the N900 mobile phone running Maemo. Modest is based on the lightweight Tinymail email framework.

== History ==
Modest was released as a public beta on December 11, 2007, and received weekly updates until its first official release as part of the Diablo release of Internet Tablet OS 2008. It replaced the previous email client osso-email. It is the default built-in email program for the Nokia N900 running Maemo 5.

== See also ==
- Maemo
- Tinymail
- Comparison of email clients
