= MicroB =

Discontinued mobile web browser

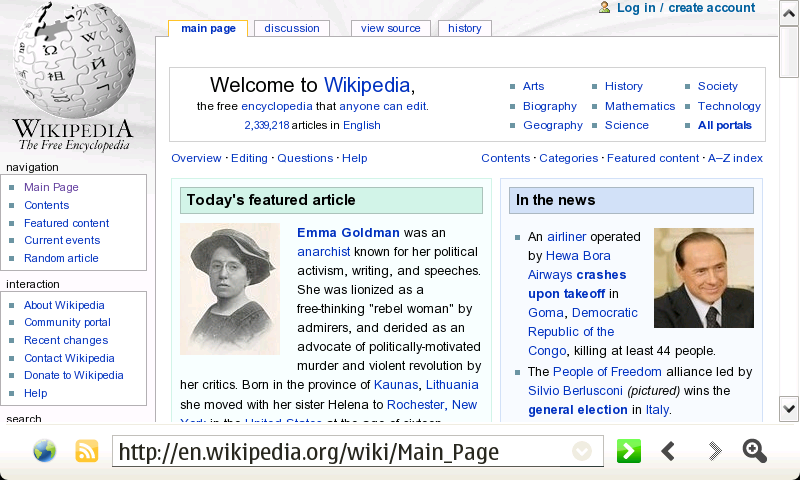
- MicroB on Maemo 4
- Developer: Nokia's maemo project
- Final release: 1.0.4 / December 17, 2008
- Operating system: Maemo
- Type: Mobile browser
- License: Proprietary EULA; Engine under MPL/GPL/LGPL tri-license
- Website: browser.garage.maemo.org

MicroB /ˌmaɪkroʊˈbiː/ was a mobile web browser developed by Nokia for use in smartphones and mobile devices that run the Maemo operating system. The browser is Mozilla-based and uses the Gecko layout engine.

It is shipped with Nokia's N800, N810 and N900 Internet Tablets, and is also available for the 770 via the 'Hacker Editions' of the operating system. In place of Mozilla's XUL-based user interface, MicroB uses the Maemo-native (GTK-based) Hildon API and widgets.

== History ==
MicroB was initially released as a public beta for Internet Tablet OS 2007 on July 17, 2007 to allow third-party developers and community members to develop and port plugins, and help shape the development of the browser. It was updated several times before it replaced Opera as Internet Tablet OS's default browser with the release of Internet Tablet OS 2008 on November 18, 2007 with the N810.

== Architecture ==
MicroB is Mozilla-based and uses the Gecko engine, but a number of features are omitted due to platform-specific limitations. In particular, SVG support is disabled due to unacceptable performance, and XUL is not included to reduce size and decrease memory consumption. As XUL is not included, most Firefox plugins require porting and repackaging before they can be used with MicroB. In place of XUL, MicroB uses GTK and the Hildon UI toolkit to provide a native interface.

=== Add-ons ===
Add-ons usually need to be ported. The Maemo Browser Extras project is responsible for a large number of the available add-ons.

==== Some MicroB Plugins ====
MicroB Plugins

- Adblock Plus
- Adobe Flash 9 (bundled with Maemo)
- Flashblock
- Gears (partial functionality)
- Greasemonkey – All scripts that work on the desktop version of Firefox work fine in MicroB, extending the capabilities of the browser and even replacing the need for some extensions which are not available for MicroB.
- MPlayer plugin
- Windows Media Player Stream and RealPlayer stream supports via the built-in Media player
- WML browser
