= Series 90 (software platform) =

Mobile phone platform

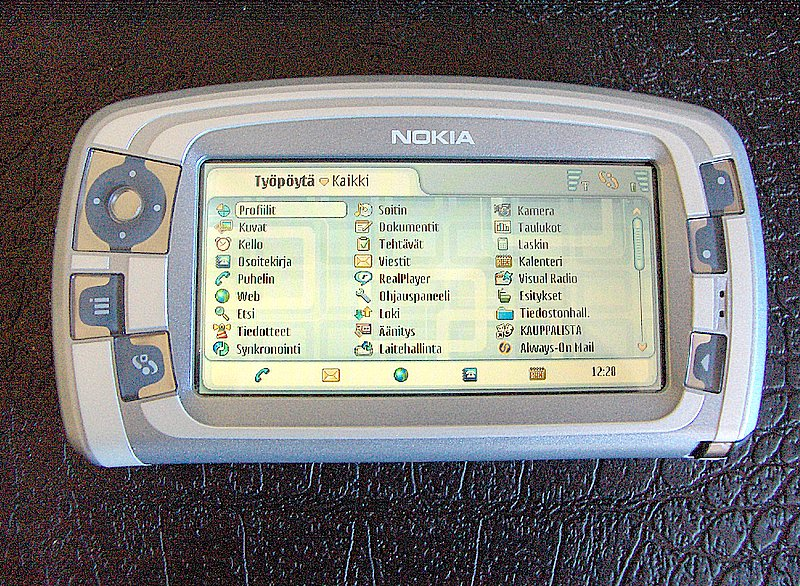
Nokia 7710 smartphone with Finnish language interface

The Series 90 (S90, formerly Hildon) is a platform for mobile phones that use the Symbian operating system (OS). It was developed by Nokia together with Psion. It was released in 2003 and was to be the platform for the Nokia 7700 which was cancelled, but S90 made it to market eventually in the Nokia 7710.

Nokia discontinued Series 90 as a platform, but merged its technology into S60. Although only one production Series 90 device was made, a form of the graphical user interface (GUI) continued on as Nokia's Hildon user interface in the Maemo shipped with Nokia Internet Tablets.

== Compatibility ==
Series 90 is fully incompatible with Series 60 (S60) and UIQ, the most popular platforms for Symbian smartphones. However, some applications from Nokia Series 80 Communicator devices, such as the Nokia 9300, will function under Series 90.

== History ==
Essentially, Series 90 is a development of the Psion Eikon GUI as used on the Series 5, Series 5mx, Revo, netPad, Series 7 and netBook machines. It has been modified to be controlled entirely through the touchscreen, supplemented by the 77x0's seven hardware buttons and rocker-dial. The Nokia 7700, which was never released, had only an on-screen keyboard for text input; the 7710 added basic handwriting recognition. Applications now have only a single menu tree, accessible from the title bar at the top of the screen; there is no Exit or Quit option in most apps; and a button bar has been added to the right hand side of the screen, resembling that of the Nokia Communicator smartphones.
