= Hildon =

Linux-based application framework

- Original author: Nokia
- Developers: Igalia, Lanedo
- Written in: C
- Operating system: Linux; Linux for mobile devices
- Type: Application framework
- License: GNU LGPL
- Website: leste.maemo.org

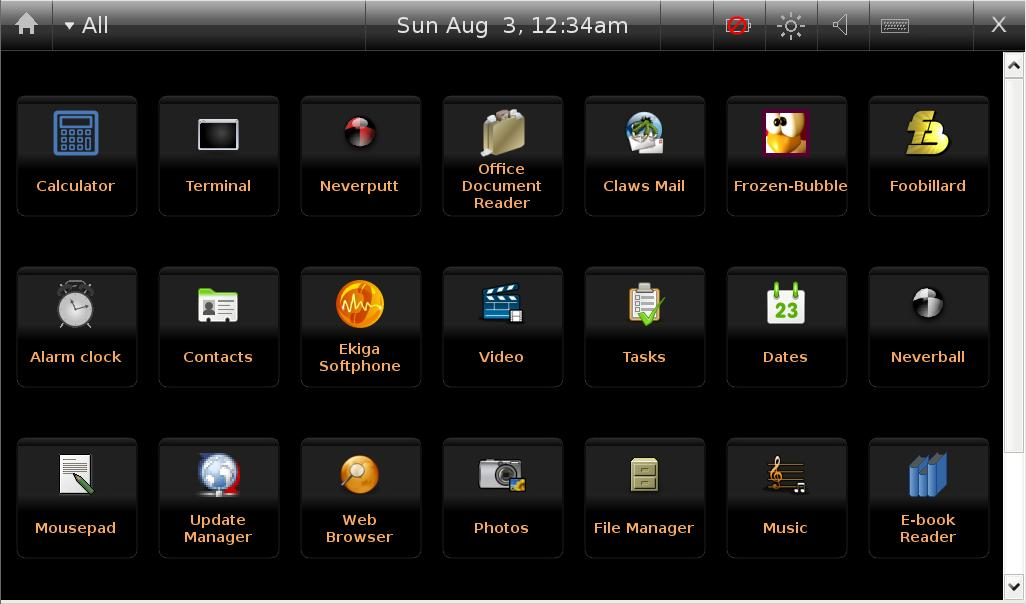
Hildon in Ubuntu Mobile and Embedded Edition

Hildon is an application framework originally developed for mobile devices (PDAs, mobile phones, etc.) running the Linux operating system as well as the Symbian operating system. The Symbian variant of Hildon was discontinued with the cancellation of Series 90. It was developed by Nokia for the Maemo operating system. It focuses on providing a finger-friendly interface. It is primarily a set of GTK extensions that provide mobile-device–oriented functionality, but also provides a desktop environment that includes a task navigator for opening and switching between programs, a control panel for user settings, and status bar, task bar and home applets. It is standard on the Maemo platform used by the Nokia Internet Tablets and the Nokia N900 smartphone.

Hildon has also been selected as the framework for Ubuntu Mobile and Embedded Edition.

Hildon was an early instance of a software platform for generic computing in a tablet device intended for internet consumption. But Nokia didn't commit to it as their only platform for their future mobile devices and the project competed against other in-house platforms. The strategic advantage of a modern platform was not exploited, being displaced by the Series 60, though its development is continued by the Maemo Leste project.

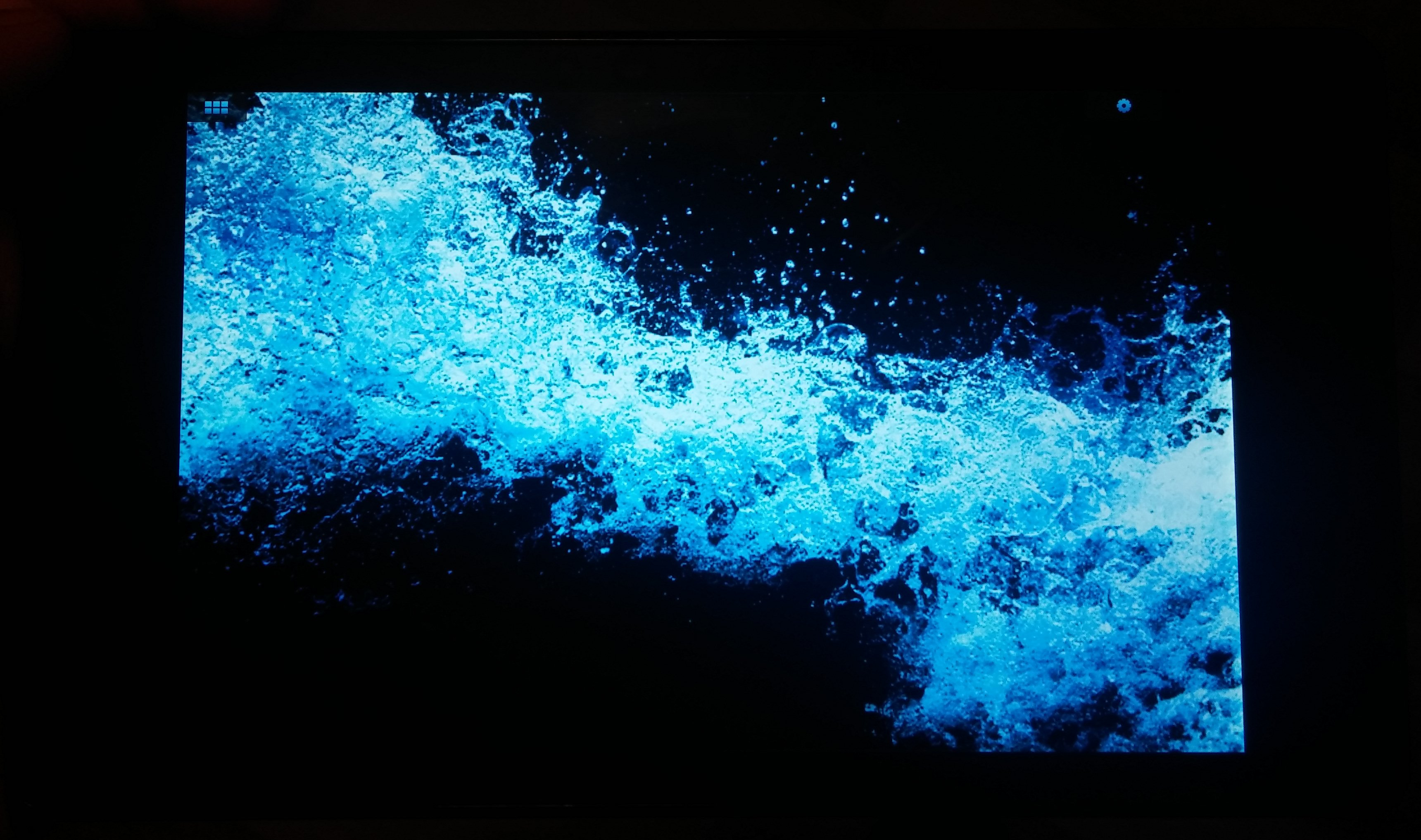
Hildon running in postmarketOS

== Components ==
The Hildon framework includes components that effectively provide a desktop environment.

=== Hildon Application Manager ===
Hildon Application Manager is the Hildon graphical package manager, it uses the Debian package management tools APT (Advanced Packaging Tool and dpkg) and provides a graphical interface for installing, updating and removing packages. It is a limited package manager, designed specifically for end-users, in that it doesn't directly offer the user access to system files and libraries. With the Diablo release of Maemo, Hildon Application Manager now supports "Seamless Software Update" (SSU), which implements a variety of features to allow system upgrades to be easily performed through it.

=== Hildon Control Panel ===
Hildon Control Panel is the user settings interface for Hildon. It provides simple access to control panels used to change system settings.

=== Hildon Desktop ===
Hildon Desktop is the primary UI component of Hildon, so makes up the bulk of what a user will see as "Hildon". It controls application launching and switching, general system control, and provides interfaces for task bar (application menu and task switcher), status bar (brightness and volume control), and home (internet radio and web search) applets.

=== Hildon Library ===
The Hildon library, originally developed by Nokia but since Maemo 5, developed by Igalia and Lanedo (who developed MaemoGTK+, the Maemo version of GTK+). It is a set of mobile specific GTK+ widgets for applications in Maemo. Up to Maemo 4, these widgets were designed for stylus usage. However, in Maemo 5, most widgets were deprecated and new widgets for direct finger manipulation were introduced, including a kinetic panning container.

== See also ==
- Qt Extended (Improved)
