= Matchbox (window manager) =

Window manager for the X Window System

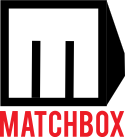
- Original author: Matthew Allum
- Developers: OpenedHand, Yocto Project
- Release: April 13, 2007; 19 years ago
- Stable release: 1.2.2 / 5 December 2016
- Operating system: Linux
- Available in: C
- Type: X window manager
- License: GPL-2.0-or-later
- Website: www.yoctoproject.org/software-item/matchbox/

Matchbox is a free and open source window manager for the X Window System. It is mainly intended for embedded systems and differs from most other window managers in that it only shows one window at a time. It is used by Maemo on Nokia Internet Tablets, the Neo 1973 smartphone based on Openmoko, the Vernier LabQuest handheld data acquisition device for science education, as well as on the XO-1 of the One Laptop Per Child Project. before being replaced by Metacity.

The project is currently developed under the Yocto Project.

== Matchbox 2 ==
Matchbox Window Manager II is a complete rewrite of the original m-w-m. It is in early stages of development.

- git.yoctoproject.org/cgit/cgit.cgi/matchbox-window-manager-2/

== See also ==
- Comparison of window managers
