= Maemo =

Mobile operating system by Nokia

- Screenshot of Maemo 5
- Developer: Nokia
- Written in: C, C++, Mono C#
- OS family: Linux (Unix-like)
- Working state: Terminated in favor of MeeGo, community support available with Maemo Leste
- Source model: Largely open-source with mandatory proprietary components
- Latest release: 5.0 PR 1.3.1 / 1 November 2011; 15 years ago
- Available in: Multilingual
- Update method: APT and flashing
- Package manager: dpkg
- Supported platforms: ARM architecture
- Kernel type: Linux kernel
- Userland: GNU
- Default user interface: Hildon UI
- License: Mixed unspecified open-source and proprietary
- Official website: maemo.org

Maemo is a Linux-based software platform originally developed by Nokia, now developed by the community, for smartphones and Internet tablets. The platform comprises both the Maemo operating system and SDK. Maemo played a key role in Nokia's failed strategy to compete with Apple and Android; the only retail devices that shipped with Maemo were the Nokia Internet tablet line released in 2005 and the Nokia N900 smartphone in 2009.

Maemo is mostly based on open-source code and has been developed by Maemo Devices within Nokia in collaboration with many open-source projects such as the Linux kernel, Debian, and GNOME. Maemo is based on Debian and draws much of its GUI, frameworks, and libraries from the GNOME project. It uses the Matchbox window manager and the GTK-based Hildon framework as its GUI and application framework.

The user interface in Maemo 4 is similar to many hand-held interfaces and features a "home" screen, from which all applications and settings are accessed. The home screen is divided into areas for launching applications, a menu bar, and a large customizable area that can display information such as an RSS reader, Internet radio player, and a Google search box. The Maemo 5 user interface is slightly different; the menu bar and info area are consolidated to the top of the display, and the four desktops can be customized with shortcuts and widgets.

At the Mobile World Congress in February 2010, it was announced that the Maemo project would be merging with Moblin to create the MeeGo mobile software platform. Despite that, the Maemo community continued to be active, and in late 2012 Nokia began transferring Maemo ownership to the Hildon Foundation, which was replaced by a German association Maemo Community e.V. Since 2017, a new release called Maemo Leste is in development which is based on Devuan.

== User interface ==
=== OS2005–OS2008 ===
Up to Maemo 4 (AKA OS2008), the default screen is the "Home" screen — the central point from which all applications and settings are accessed. The Home Screen is divided into the following areas:

- Vertically down the left hand side of the screen is the taskbar, with applets for the web browser, communications, and application menu by default. These can be modified using third party plug-ins (e.g. to provide a favorites or command menu).
- Horizontally across the top left half is the menu bar, which shows the application name and window title, and gives access to the application's menu (which contains the typical file, edit, view, tools, etc., menus and sub-menus).
- Horizontally across the top right quadrant is the status bar, containing icons such as battery life, wireless connection, volume, Bluetooth status, and brightness by default. These can be expanded using third party plug-ins in the same manner as the task-bar.
- The remaining large part of the display contains Home applets (roughly analogous to Apple Inc.'s Dashboard widgets), which can display data as well as serving as a shortcut to applications. These include an RSS reader, Internet radio player, Google search box and contact list by default, but can also be expanded with third party plug-ins.

The interface uses either the touch screen, or a directional pad and select button, with separate back, menu, and home buttons. It is capable of receiving text input through handwriting recognition, two different sizes of on-screen keyboard and hardware keyboard input with the N810.

=== Maemo 5 (Fremantle) ===
The Nokia N900 uses the Linux-based Maemo 5 OS.

The user interface in Maemo 5 is different from its predecessors. It provides four fully customizable (with the ability to add/remove widgets, move widgets around, change the background and customize shortcuts to applications/contacts) "Home" screens, called Panorama Desktop. Switching from one desktop to the others is done by sliding one's finger horizontally on the background. The dashboard is accessed via the upper left icon and shows all the running applications, in a manner similar to the Exposé feature in Apple's Mac OS X operating system. From the dashboard, running applications can be brought back to full screen by tapping the preview window, and applications can be closed by tapping an X-symbol located in the top right corner of the preview window, similar to the concept of closing applications in other operating systems. The application launcher, where all the installed applications can be launched, can also be accessed from the dashboard. If no task or application is running in the background, tapping the top left icon skips the dashboard and directly displays the application launcher.

Maemo provides the Mozilla-based MicroB web-browser with complete Adobe Flash support. It supports an 800×480 display resolution, so some web pages can be viewed without horizontal scrolling. It can automatically connect to known wireless networks, download RSS feeds and email and disconnect automatically without user intervention.

Advanced Packaging Tool with a command-line apt-get client can be used to install applications. Users can subscribe to different software repositories, which can then be used to automatically keep software up to date. The application manager also provides an overview of everything currently installed on the system. Data can be synchronized with a PC via a USB connection, and the user's files can be accessed using the standard Removable Storage Device protocol.

A new update (Version 21.2011.38-1.002) was released onto the Nokia N900 on 2 November 2011 as an OTA update. The new version mostly consists of security updates. This is considered to be the final official update to Maemo 5/Fremantle shipped by Nokia.

Further development of Maemo 5 happens as a community effort in Maemo-CSSU.

== Features ==
=== Updating ===
Maemo devices can be updated using a simple flashing method with a computer over USB.

Since Diablo (Maemo 4.1), Maemo supports "Seamless Software Update" (SSU), which allows incremental operating system upgrades "over the air" using the Advanced Packaging Tool, without the need for a full flash with every update.

Flashing remains available as a way to start over from scratch with a clean installation (much like formatting a hard drive and reinstalling an operating system on a PC).

=== Security ===
The quick start guide for developers warns that Maemo security concentrates on preventing remote attacks (e.g. by wireless networking and Bluetooth). It also warns that Maemo's root account has a trivial default password (user: gainroot, password: rootme) which needs to be changed before enabling remote access.

Maemo employs a numeric security code as a way to lock the device's controls and display independently of the root password, to help prevent unauthorised access.

== Software architecture ==
Maemo is a modified version of the Debian Linux distribution, slimmed down for mobile devices. It uses an X Window System-based graphical user interface using Xomap and the Matchbox window manager. The GUI uses the GTK+ toolkit and Hildon user interface widgets and API.

BusyBox, a software package for embedded and mobile devices, replaces the GNU Core Utilities used in Debian-proper to reduce memory usage and storage requirements (at the expense of some functionality).

ESD is used as the primary sound server, and GStreamer is used by the shipped media player to play back sounds and movies. The formats supported by GStreamer can be extended by compiling GStreamer plugins in scratchbox (Maemo SDK), which was done, for example, to bring Ogg support to the platform, as well as experimental features such as WebM and VP8 after they were announced by Google. Third-party media players can access GStreamer directly or via "osso-media-server".

Window management is handled by the Matchbox window manager, which limits the screen to showing a single window at a time (Ubuntu Netbook Edition implements a similar system). This is to improve usability on a mobile device with a small screen.

Although Maemo is based on Linux and other open source software, some parts of Maemo remain closed source. These include some user-space software, like certain status bar and taskbar applets (including the display brightness applet) and applications, and some system daemons related to connectivity and power management.

== Software ==
Maemo comes with a number of built-in applications, but additional applications can be installed from a number of sources, including various official and community software repositories, and deb files through either the built-in package manager "Application manager", or the Advanced Packaging Tool and dpkg. Bundled applications include the Mozilla-based MicroB browser, Macromedia Flash player, Gizmo5, and Skype.

=== Notable third-party applications ===
Due in part to the free and open source nature of Linux and Maemo, porting applications to Maemo is a straightforward procedure. Because of this, there are many third-party applications available for the platform. Some applications are original software written specifically for Maemo, while other applications are straight ports of existing Linux programs. Some notable software includes:

Media players
MPlayer
Internet
Claws Mail, Modest, Midori, Firefox for mobile, Opera Mobile
Office applications
Gnumeric (spreadsheet), Abiword (word processing)
Instant Messaging
Pidgin
VOIP
Gizmo5, Skype
Games
The Battle for Wesnoth, Wormux, Doom, Angry Birds
Others
FBReader (e-book reader), GPE (OpenSync compatible PIM), rdesktop (RDP remote access), Rhapsody (subscription music, US only), ScummVM (game emulator), Free42 (HP-42S calculator emulator), Monsoon HAVA (TV viewer and controller), Navit (GPS navigation software), Vagalume (Last.FM player), VNC
Fremantle Stars
Applications developed by the community and supported by Nokia as Fremantle Stars will be part of Maemo 5. Notable applications include ScummVM (game, includes Beneath a Steel Sky) and Fennec (web browser).
Debian

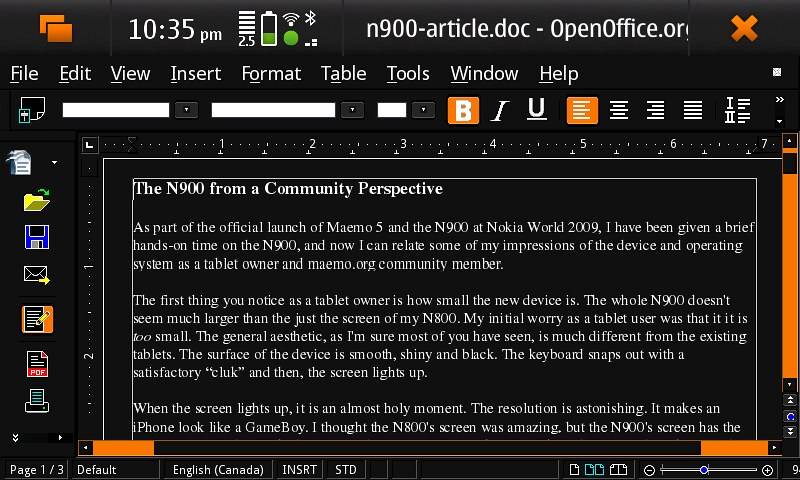
OpenOffice.org running on Maemo 5 using Easy Debian

The complete ARM Debian distribution can be installed as a Maemo application, making thousands of software packages available (including OpenOffice.org, Mozilla Firefox, Java, the GNOME and LXDE desktops, etc.). Debian ARM packages can also be used if they are modified with the maemo-optify tool. The ability to run largely unmodified linux packages sets Maemo apart from other Linux-based mobile operating systems, such as Android and webOS.

=== Media support ===
Other media types, such as the audio format .OGG, can be added with the use of community plug-ins.

Video
MPEG-1, MPEG-4 ASP (H.263), RealVideo, AVI, 3GP
Audio/playlists
MP3, RealAudio, MPEG-4, AAC, WAV, AMP, MP2, AMR, AWB, M4A, WMA. OGG/Vorbis (requires addon package), M3U, PLS
Image/Animation
JPEG, BMP, TIFF, PNG, SVG Tiny, ICO
Text/layout
text files, PDF, HTML.

== Software development ==
Software can be developed in C using the Maemo SDK, Java (which is supported by the Jalimo JVM), Python, Ruby, Mono, Vala, Perl and Pascal.

The Maemo SDK is based around the Debian-oriented Scratchbox Cross Compilation Toolkit, which provides a sandbox environment in which development may take place. Scratchbox uses QEMU to emulate an ARM processor or sbrsh to remotely execute instructions. Scratchbox-compatible rootstraps are available for both x86 and ARM, so the majority of development and debugging takes place on x86, with final packaging being for ARM.

As a new feature of the Maemo operating system, Maemo 5 offers the Qt library as a community-supported component, alongside the officially supported GTK+ backend. This will change with the Harmattan release, which will add the Qt library as the default, with GTK+ becoming community-supported. The programming languages Python, C and C++ will also be supported.

The Nokia Developer Wiki community has articles about Qt development, and includes tutorials and articles about development for the Maemo operating system.

== Hardware ==
The Maemo operating system is designed for Nokia Internet Tablets, which feature very similar specifications to Nokia's high-end N-series and E-series cellphones, with TI OMAP ARM SoCs, large screens, and expandable internal storage. Although the highly optimized, hardware-specific nature of Maemo renders its operation on non-Internet tablet hardware very difficult, most of the important non-proprietary parts of the operating system, along with some of the available third-party applications, are actively being packaged for Debian and are available for use on other distributions, which will open up a large range of other hardware options.

Nokia runs the Maemo operating system on the Nokia N900 and Nokia N9.

== Version history ==
Versions of Maemo and of some of the forks

=== OS2005 ===
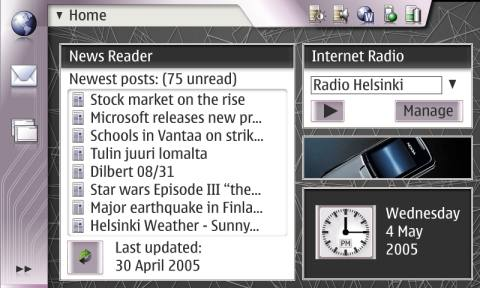
OS2005 Desktop

Shipped with the 770 in November 2005, this is the original Internet tablet OS. It came bundled with the Opera web browser, Flash 6, basic email and RSS clients, audio and video players, PDF and image viewers, a graphical Advanced Packaging Tool, front-end (dubbed simply "Application manager"), and a variety of simple games and utilities.

=== OS2006 ===
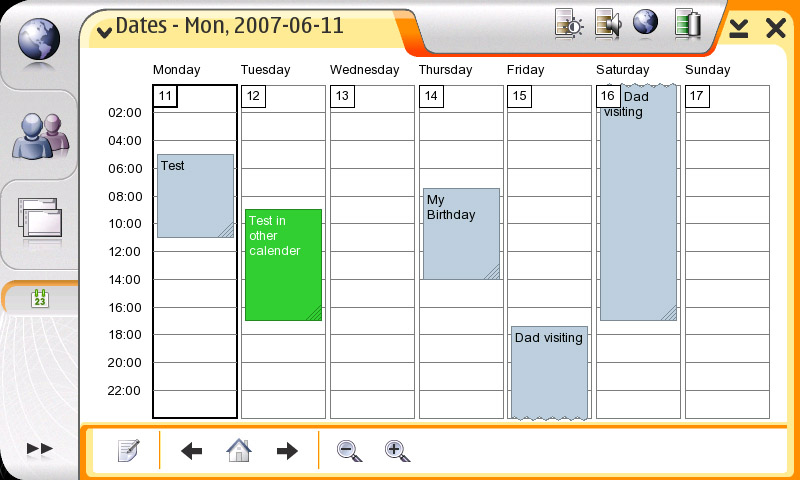
OS2006 showing Pimlico Dates

On 16 May 2006, Nokia announced a new version of Internet Tablet OS, which was subsequently released as a beta version for the 770 on 9 June 2006 and as a production version on 20 June 2006. The update featured improved performance and stability, a built-in Google Talk client, a refreshed look, and a new full-screen finger keyboard. Because of significant API and architecture changes, existing applications required recompiling. It is the last officially supported Internet Tablet OS release for the 770.

Also included was the ability to support 2 GB RS-MMC cards (FAT formatted). The Linux kernel was upgraded to 2.6.16, with the associated patches for the OMAP platform included. This new version uses kernel preemption for improved interactivity.

=== OS2007 ===
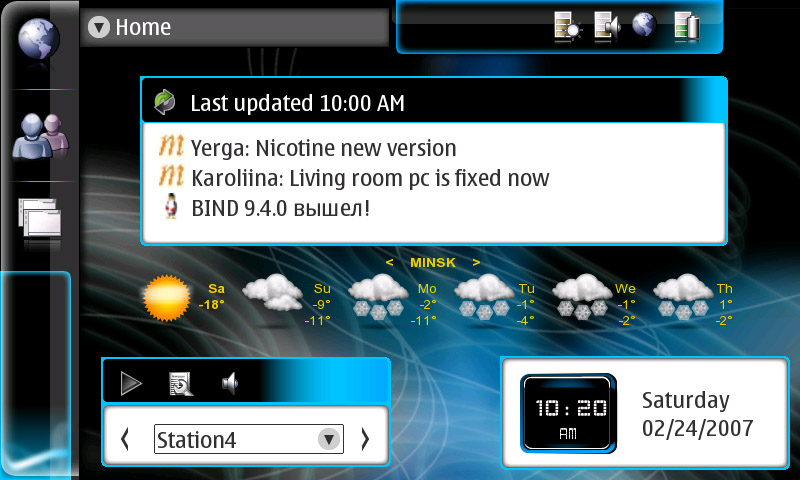
OS2007 Desktop showing OMWeather

OS2007 was released and bundled with the N800 on 8 January 2007, after its unveiling at the Las Vegas CES 2007 summit. It featured significant bug fixes and performance improvements in almost all areas of the OS, bringing updated versions of the Opera web browser and Adobe Flash Player 7, an updated interface and various API and library updates.

=== OS2008 ===
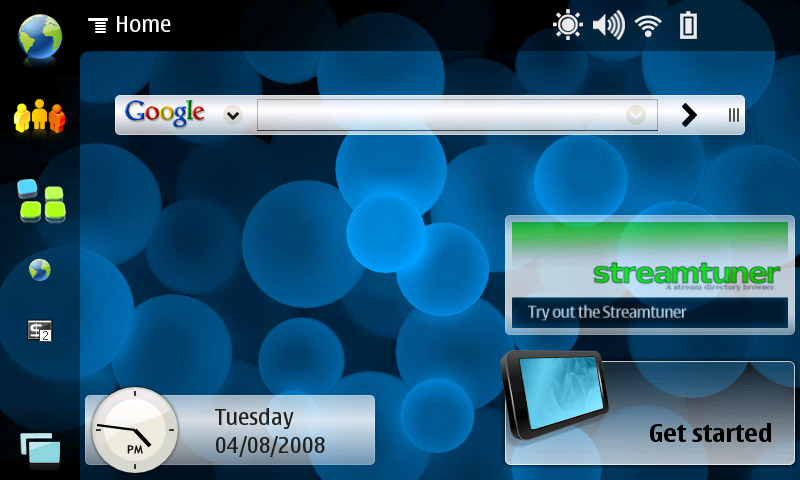
OS2008 Desktop

OS2008 was released with the N810 in November 2007, based on Linux 2.6.21, and featuring MicroB, a new Mozilla-based web browser that replaces Opera. It also features integrated Samba file sharing and additional support for Windows Media Player Formats and H.264 and improved support for USB devices, among other incremental UI improvements (particularly in the direction of finger-friendliness). Dynamic frequency scaling (between 165 MHz and 400 MHz) was also implemented, which gave the N800 a 70 MHz speed increase.

==== Diablo ====
Diablo is the codename for the OS2008 Feature Upgrade (corresponding to Maemo 4.1), released in June 2008. Major features include significant improvements to the built-in Application manager, incremental operating system upgrades without reflashing ("Seamless Software Update", SSU), Modest as the default mail client, and a new version of the MicroB browser with better performance and some interface improvements (though still based on the same Gecko release as Chinook's MicroB). Diablo also included an implementation of the WiMAX stack for the short-lived N810 variation called N810 WiMAX edition.

==== SSU ====
SSU, in particular, is one of the most significant parts of the Diablo release, as it eliminates the flash-based upgrade system of previous Maemo releases which required the user to completely wipe their device with each upgrade. With SSU, the user can receive "over-the-air" updates. This also decouples bundled software updates from the major system updates, as was required with the flash-based method, so Nokia can release more frequent updates to individual packages than before.

The first SSU update was pushed on 11 August 2008, and brought Diablo up to version 4.2008.30-2. The update primarily features MicroB, Modest, and connectivity framework updates as well as a number of other minor bugfixes.

=== Maemo 5 ===
Maemo 5 Screenshot

Maemo 5, also known as Fremantle, is the default operating system on the Nokia N900. The release features a much more finger-friendly and consistent user interface, and an X-server based on Xorg rather than KDrive. It also features several new technologies, including the Tracker search system, PulseAudio (replacing ESD), the OHM hardware management daemon, the gUPnP UPnP framework, enhanced location framework, and Upstart. Several existing technologies have also been updated, including Gecko, BlueZ, gstreamer (will include OpenMAX), GTK+, and Telepathy.

Maemo 5 comes with new hardware, the Nokia N900 featuring a Texas Instruments OMAP3 SoC, with an HSPA modem and HD camera, which provides significant improvements in speed, 3D acceleration, and media playback. Nokia decided that the commercial Maemo 5 platform releases will not be available on N800/N810 hardware, for compatibility reasons. An open source Linux project called Mer, a variant of Maemo, has been formed to provide an alternative, fully open operating system for mobile devices including the Nokia N800 and N810.

Unlike most smartphones, the end-user is able to gain root access by installing an application, such as the "rootsh", and then issuing the appropriate command in the terminal in Maemo 5. The device does not need to be unlocked or "jailbroken" in order to install an unsupported application. The UK cellular operator Vodafone has its own branded, somewhat more restricted version of the Maemo 5 operating system. Users can flash (change) to the global variant of the operating system if they wish.

The Maemo 5 operating system comes preloaded with a variety of applications such as:

Web
Maemo Browser (Mozilla based web browser with Adobe Flash 9.4), RSS reader
Phone application
VoIP
Session Initiation Protocol, Skype
Conversations (IM chat and SMS, no MMS)
Media
Camera, Photos, Media player
Production
Email, Calendar, PDF reader, Contacts
Ovi Maps (Find position on a map using the GPS, Search an address or location, Plan routes)
Utilities
Clock, Notes, Calculator, Sketch
System Tools
File manager, Application manager for downloads, Widgets
Games
Bounce, Chess, Blocks, Marbles and Mahjong

Nokia expects the open source community to play a large part in the development of applications for Maemo 5. For example, Nokia has launched a contest at the onedotzero festival in London called PUSH N900 aimed at designers, artists, hackers and modders. The contest invites participants "to connect the N900 to something you love."

More than 1500 additional applications (mostly free to download and use) have been created by third-party developers.

=== Maemo Leste ===
Maemo Leste (Maemo 7)
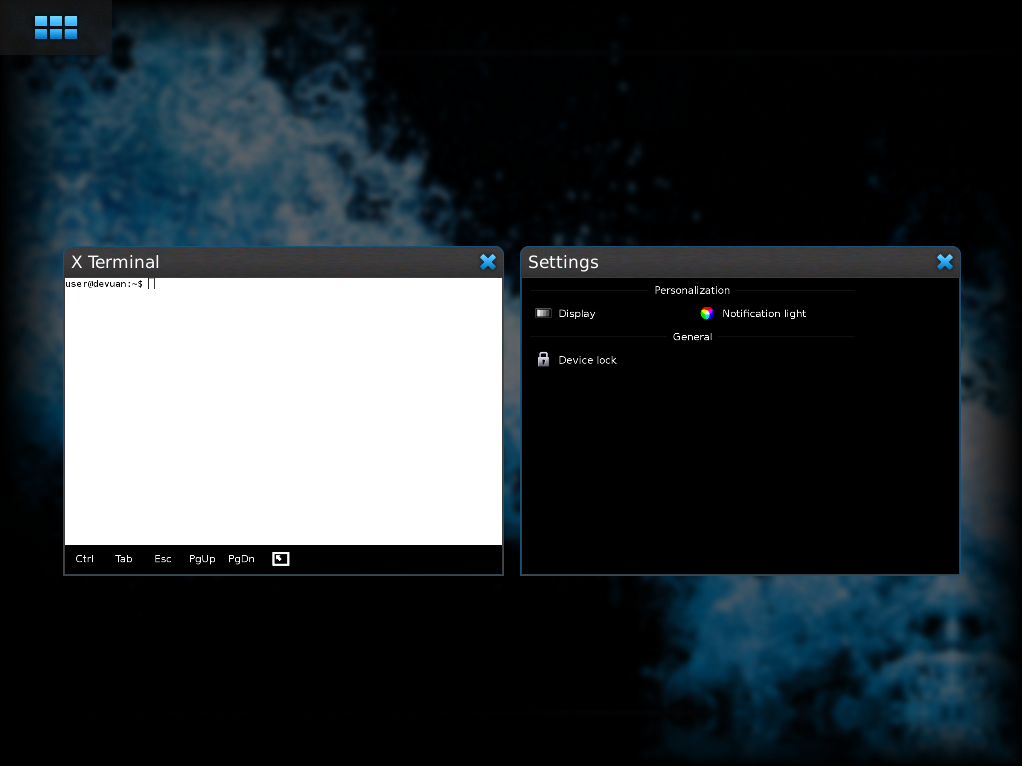
- Developer: Maemo Leste open-source community
- OS family: Unix-like
- Working state: Active
- Source model: Open source
- Marketing target: Operating system for smartphones
- Update method: ROM flashing or dpkg (package manager)
- Package manager: dpkg
- Supported platforms: ARM, ARM64, x86-64
- Kernel type: Monolithic (Linux)
- Default user interface: Hildon
- Official website: maemo-leste.github.io

Maemo Leste is an operating system currently in development. It is a modernised and liberated version of Maemo 5, rebased on top of Devuan with a mainline Linux kernel. It aims to develop "An independent mobile operating system focused on trustworthiness." The first operating system images were released in February 2018. The latest release supports phone calls and SMS messages on a number of devices, including the Nokia N900 (some integration and bug fixes remain) and the Motorola Droid 4, as announced in the project's Five-year anniversary blog post.

It is currently in a usable state with support for various targets such as the N900, Motorola Droid 4 and the PinePhone. Unlike other distributions, Maemo Leste targets devices where it can be used with upstream Linux kernels - to offer proper updates to both functionality and security. The operating system aims to be entirely open source, and even re-implements certain closed components that were present in Maemo Fremantle.

Maemo Leste is entirely community-developed, and its developers are active on #maemo-leste ^{connect} on the Libera Chat IRC network.

=== Hacker Editions ===
Nokia's release of the N800 in January 2007 included Internet Tablet OS 2007. OS2007 ran only on the N800 and Nokia had no plans to release it for the 770; however feedback from disgruntled 770 owners led Nokia to release an unsupported hybrid of OS2006 and OS2007, dubbed Internet Tablet OS 2007 Hacker Edition, in February 2007. OS2007HE combined the binary parts of OS2006 with most of the updated libraries and user-space applications of OS2007.

Nokia followed the release of the N810 and OS2008 in November 2007 with the OS2008 Hacker Edition for the 770 on 14 February 2008, employing a similar method to the OS2007HE release to create a hybrid between OS2006 and OS2007. The Hacker Editions allow 770 users to access the latest Internet Tablet OS releases and third-party software, although due to the 770's hardware limitations and the increased CPU requirements of OS2008, performance is inferior to that of OS2007 HE in most areas.

=== Alternative desktops ===
In addition to the officially supported Hildon environment that comes standard on the tablets, several alternate desktop systems are available. Penguinbait, a member of the Internet Tablet Talk community, has successfully ported KDE 3, Openbox, and Xfce to the N800 and N810 (the N770 is able to run an early version of the KDE port). A port of KDE Plasma Workspaces were developed. LXDE is the default desktop for the Easy Debian distribution, which is installed as a single application under Maemo but provides access to the full range of software in the ARM Debian distribution (including GIMP, Iceweasel/Firefox and OpenOffice) via a chroot environment.

== Derivatives ==
Maemo and its related mobile operating systems

=== MeeGo ===
In the wake of the release of the MeeGo code base, there are two main community efforts to bring MeeGo to the current Maemo devices (N800, N810, and N900), as Nokia has launched the N9, which is powered by MeeGo. These efforts are the MeeGo adaptation for the N800 and N810 devices, and the MeeGo to N900 project.

=== Harmattan ===
Harmattan was originally planned as a transitional operating system developed by Nokia, meant to be a bridge between Nokia's Maemo and the MeeGo project. It is still using the APT package manager for applications, but the graphical user interface and major parts of the system were improved, rewritten from scratch or rebased on top of Meego frameworks. It is heavily using the Qt libraries instead of GTK+/Hildon, and introduced a new UI paradigm based on Swipe gestures, done from the edge of the screen. After problems with the original Meego project, Nokia decided to rename Harmattan to Meego/Harmattan and shipped their N9 with this OS.

=== Mer ===
Mer is a completely free and open-source software distribution targeting mobile and embedded systems, first developed for reimplementing Maemo in the open, and then rebased on top of the MeeGo tools.

=== Qt ===
In January 2008, Nokia began the process of acquiring Trolltech, the developer of the Qt application framework. Nokia has since announced plans for the Qt libraries to be bundled with Maemo by Q4 2008, though without a platform-specific "hildonized" user interface as is offered with GTK (meaning Qt applications will look different from hildonized GTK applications). This will make porting of Qt applications to the platform easier for developers, and make new applications available to users. Qt support on S60 devices will likely lead to cross-platform application sharing between the two platforms. The announcement has been met with mixed reactions in the developer community.

== Release history ==
=== Naming ===
Maemo codenames are named for winds. For example, the latest release, codenamed "Fremantle", is a reference to the Fremantle Doctor, the Western Australian vernacular term for the cooling afternoon sea breeze which occurs during summer months in south west coastal areas of Western Australia.

	Version	Codename	Build identifier	Release date	First device shipped with	Notes	Devices Supported
OS2005	1.1	-	2.2005.45-1	November 2005	770		770
OS2005	1.1	-	3.2005.51-13	December 2005			770
OS2005	1.1	-	5.2006.13-7	April 2006			770
OS2006	2.0	Mistral	0.2006.22-21	May 2006		Beta release	770
OS2006	2.0	Mistral	1.2006.26-8	May 2006			770
OS2006	2.1	Scirocco	2.2006.39-14	November 2006			770
OS2006	2.2	Gregale	3.2006.49-2	January 2007	770		770
OS2007	3.0	Bora	2.2006.51-6	January 2007	N800		770*, N800
OS2007	3.1	Bora	3.2007.10-7	March 2007			770*, N800
OS2007	3.2	Bora	4.2007.26-8	July 2007			770*, N800
OS2007	3.2	Bora	4.2007.38-2	October 2007		SDHC corruption fix	770*, N800
OS2008	4.0	Chinook	1.2007.42-18	November 2007	N810	(N810 only)	N810
OS2008	4.0	Chinook	1.2007.42-19	November 2007		Kernel upgrade only (N810 only)	N810
OS2008	4.0	Chinook	1.2007.44-4	November 2007		Beta release (N800 only)	N800
OS2008	4.0	Chinook	2.2007.50-2	November 2007			770*, N800, N810
OS2008	4.0	Chinook	2.2007.51-3	January 2008		NOLO (Nokia bootloader) upgrade only	770*, N800, N810
OS2008	4.1	Diablo	4.2008.23-14	June 2008		Adds SSU (Seamless Software Update) support	N800, N810
OS2008	4.1	Diablo	4.2008.30-2	August 2008		First SSU update	N800, N810
OS2008	4.1	Diablo	4.2008.36-5	September 2008			N800, N810
OS2008	4.1	Diablo	5.2008.43-7	December 2008			N800, N810
Maemo 5	5.0	Fremantle	1.2009.42-11	November 2009	N900	Bundled officially supported Qt libraries (PR1.2), emphasis on finger use rather than stylus use	N900
Maemo 5	5.0	Fremantle	1.2009.44-1	January 2010		Preparatory release for the 2.2009.51-1 firmware, released only OTA (Over-the-air) to 1.2009.42-11 users	N900
Maemo 5	5.0	Fremantle	2.2009.51-1	January 2010		Also known as PR1.1.	N900
Maemo 5	5.0	Fremantle	3.2010.02-8	February 2010		Preparatory release for the PR1.2 firmware. Also known as PR1.1.1.	N900
Maemo 5	5.0	Fremantle	10.2010.12-9	May 2010		PR1.2, Hong Kong only, with Chinese input methods, with Chinese input support.	N900
Maemo 5	5.0	Fremantle	10.2010.19-1	May 2010		PR1.2, Skype and Google video calls, Facebook IM chat, improved Maps, portrait browsing, improved email, Qt 4.6 enabling new applications	N900
Maemo 5	5.0	Fremantle	20.2010.36-2	25 October 2010		PR1.3, Qt 4.7.0, full OVI-Suite support, updated kernel with kexec patches for MeeGo, bug fixes.	N900
Maemo 5	5.0	Fremantle	21.2011.38-1	26 October 2011		PR1.3.1, Fixes DigiNotar issue and control panel applet security issue	N900
MeeGo	1.0	Arlington	1.0	26 May 2010		Primarily a Netbook release; only a code drop was released for mobile devices (the Nokia N900).	N900, etc.
MeeGo	1.1	Irvine	1.1	28 October 2010		Touch-based devices support proposed with the Handset UX	Aava and Nokia N900
MeeGo	1.2	Harmattan	1.2011.34-2	19 May 2011	N950	Bundled officially supported Qt libraries, begins the transition to MeeGo, includes MeeGo libraries but core system is Maemo.	N9, N950

*: Hacker Editions, Nokia-released, but community-maintained. Primarily used by developers to continue developing programs while using older hardware.

== Maemo Summit ==
In 2008 and 2009, Maemo developers and users gathered at the Maemo Summit, the registration for which was free. Each participant got a badge and a Maemo T-shirt.

The 2009 Maemo Summit was held in Amsterdam on 9 October. The first day was the Nokia day, with the other two days dedicated to community contributions. Nearly 400 developers attended the summit. Nokia gave out 300 N900 devices to independent developers during the summit.

The 2009 Maemo Summit was also the last Maemo Summit since MeeGo was launched. The event was replaced by the MeeGo Conference.

== See also ==
- Easy Peasy
- Hildon
- Series 90 (software platform)
- Jolla
- MeeGo
- oFono
- Symbian
- Tizen
- Ubuntu Mobile
- Nokia N900
- Nokia N950
- Sailfish OS
