= Nokia 7700 =

2003 prototype mobile phone by Nokia

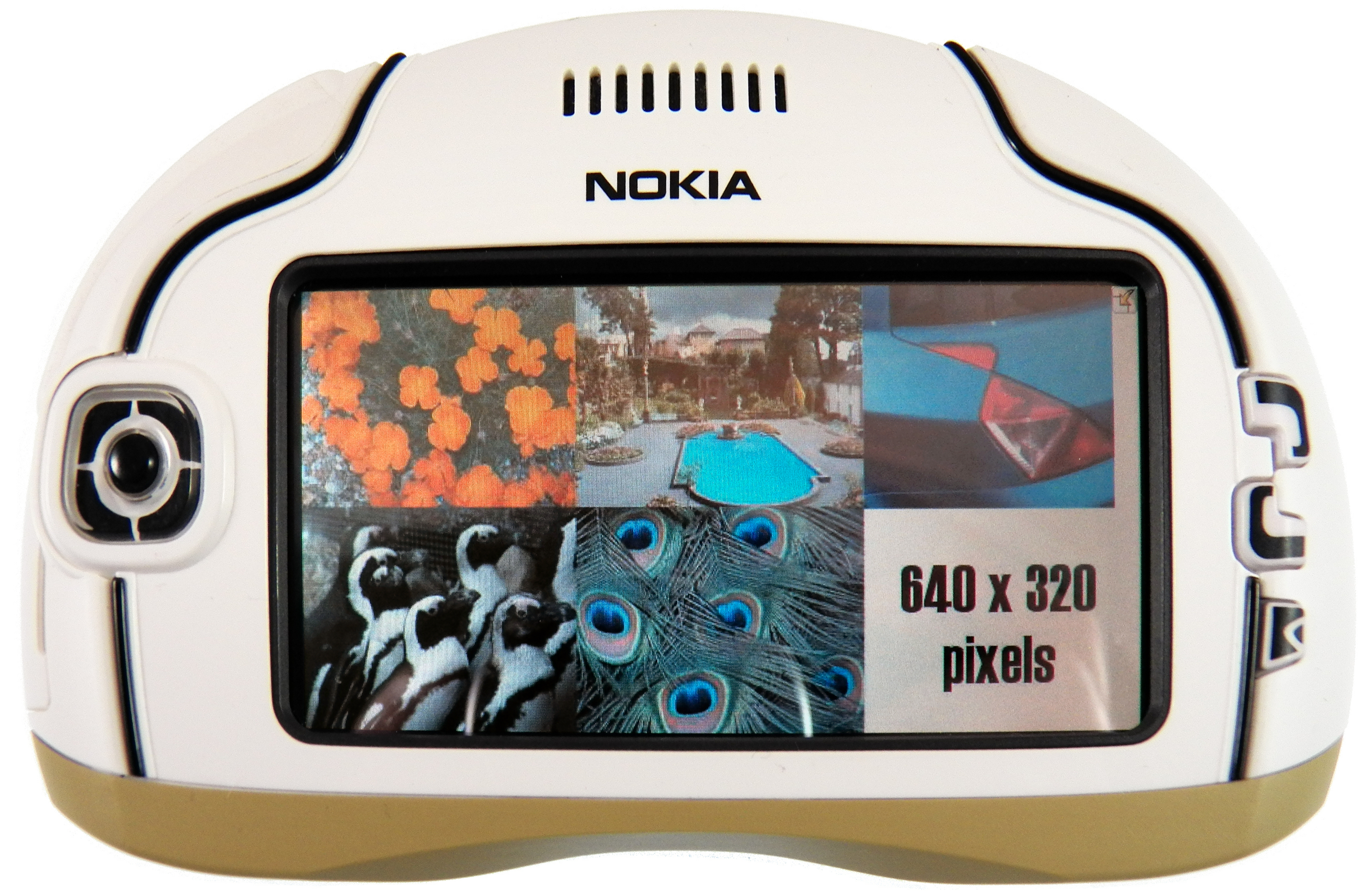
- Manufacturer: Nokia
- Availability by region: Never released
- Predecessor: Nokia 3300
- Successor: Nokia 7710
- Related: Nokia 9500 Communicator; Nokia N-Gage
- Compatible networks: GPRS, HSCSD, EDGE
- Dimensions: 134×80×22 mm (5.28×3.15×0.87 in)
- Weight: 183 g (6 oz)
- Operating system: Symbian OS / Nokia Series 90
- Memory: 64 MB
- Removable storage: MMC
- Rear camera: 640 × 480 VGA
- Display: 640 × 320
- Media: 165 cc
- Connectivity: Bluetooth, Nokia Pop-Port (USB)
- Data inputs: Touchscreen

The Nokia 7700 (Model - M Type RAL-2) was a mobile phone produced by Nokia, announced in October 2003 but never released. It was produced as a prototype unit between 2003-2004. It was expected to be the first smartphone running the Series 90 GUI on Symbian OS and Nokia's first pen-based device, intending to compete against handsets like Sony Ericsson P800. At announcement Nokia dubbed it a "media device."

== Features ==
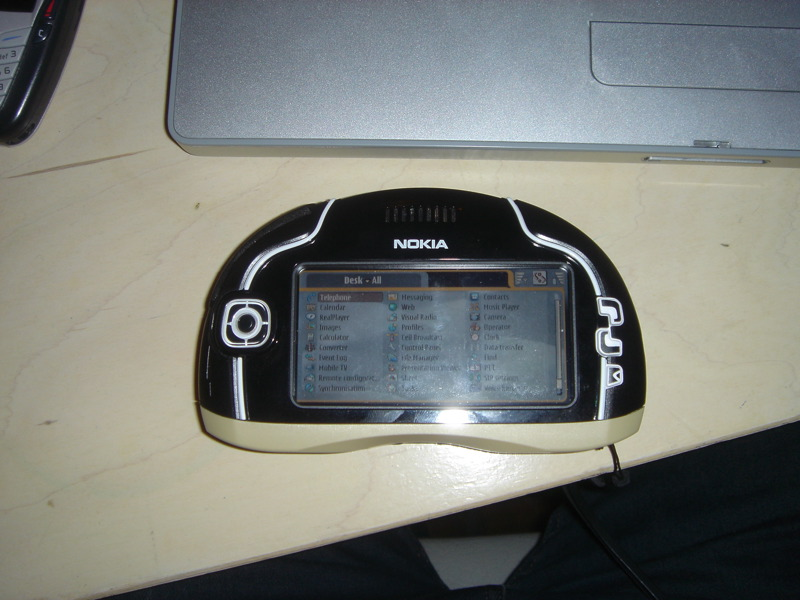
The Nokia 7700

Compatible with GSM/HSCSD/GPRS/EDGE 900/1800/1900 MHz networks, the 7700 featured a wide, 3.5-inch touch-screen colour LCD with a resolution of 640 × 320 pixels which is the first smartphone with 2:1 aspect ratio and supporting 65,000 colours. It had 64 MB of internal memory and a MultiMedia Card (MMC) slot. It also included an integrated VGA camera with a maximum resolution of 640 × 480 pixels, an integrated FM radio, Bluetooth, USB and Nokia's proprietary Pop-Port interface for connectivity purposes.

The 7700 was to include a comprehensive application suite (such as a complete PIM suite, 'full' web browser, email client and an office suite comprising Word Processor, Spread-Sheet and a PowerPoint viewer) and supported Java MIDP 2.0 applications. It was also to be the first phone to support Visual Radio, and the first Nokia phone to support DVB-H mobile television with the addition of the Nokia Streamer SU-6 accessory.

== Cancellation ==
The Nokia 7700 was cancelled in mid-2004. Several theories for the cancellation were put forward at the time: Nokia was refocusing on 'normal' phones due to decreasing market share; the phone would be too late to market; and the phone was unattractive and bulky. It also featured 'sidetalking' like the N-Gage, a feature that had attracted a great deal of negative publicity.

=== Successor ===
The Nokia 7710 followed shortly later with increased memory, a different design, no 'sidetalking' and other improvements. However, the 7700 was nevertheless used for further trials of DVB-H.

== Pricing ==
As stated above, the Nokia 7700 was never released to the public. It was only released to Nokia's R&D (Research and Development) groups. A few models, estimated 20, were distributed prior to Nokia's decision to discontinue the model before full-on production. However as they were preparing to make the move into stores, the final product prototypes were available in every Nokia Dealer store for display and show-off, so an estimate on how many pieces there actually were is impossible to make, or how many remained in factories and services that were testing them. Pricing is thus very difficult to assess due to lack of official sales. Nevertheless, a few models were sold on eBay since Nokia's announcement of discontinuation. The lack of independent data to verify the sale records on eBay has caused some to overestimate the actual cost of the model. The phone is nevertheless considered by a number of Nokia collectors to be one of the rarest pieces among Nokia E80 and Nokia Neo.
