= Nokia 7710 =

2004 cell phone model

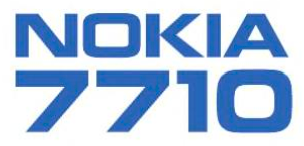

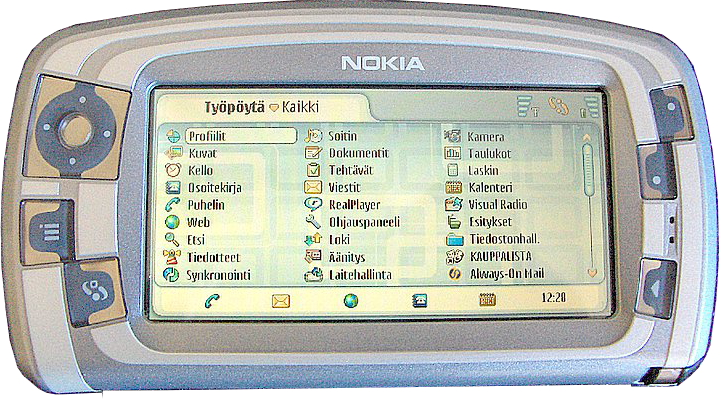
- Manufacturer: Nokia
- Availability by region: 2004
- Predecessor: Nokia 7700
- Successor: Nokia 770 Internet Tablet; Nokia N800
- Compatible networks: GPRS, HSCSD, EDGE
- Dimensions: 128×69.5×19 mm (5.04×2.74×0.75 in)
- Weight: 189 g (7 oz)
- Operating system: Symbian OS / Nokia Series 90
- Memory: ~90 MB (shared)
- Removable storage: MMC
- Battery: BP-5L, 1300 mAh lithium-ion
- Rear camera: 1 MP, Video Recording
- Display: 640 x 320 px, 65,536 colours
- Connectivity: Bluetooth, Nokia Pop-Port (USB)
- Data inputs: Touchscreen

The Nokia 7710 was a mobile phone developed by Nokia and announced on 2 November 2004. It was the first Nokia device with a touchscreen (4 years ahead of the Nokia 5800 XpressMusic), and the first Nokia branded device with a 2:1 aspect ratio display (14 years ahead of Nokia 7 Plus). The 7710 is based on the unreleased Nokia 7700, sporting a less radical design compared to the more rounded appearance of the 7700. It is Nokia's only smartphone to run the Series 90 interface atop Symbian OS v7.0s.

== Features ==
Compatible with GSM/HSCSD/GPRS/EDGE 900/1800/1900 MHz networks, the 7710 features a wide, touch-screen colour LCD with a resolution of 640 x 320 pixels and 16-bit colour depth, which also boasts a special power save mode activating only 640 x 64 pixels of the display. It has 90 MB of internal memory supported by a 128 MB MultiMedia Card (MMC). The external memory can be upgraded up to 2 GB.

Moreover, the Nokia 7710 also offers multiple-format video recording courtesy of its integrated digital camera, supporting QCIF resolution at 17 frame/s in MPEG4, H.263 and Real Video 8 formats - for which the device also supports full-screen playback at 15 frame/s. Additionally, a music player supports MP3, AAC, RealAudio 7 and 8, WAV, MIDI and AMR formats, whilst picture viewing is also in place with support for JPEG, GIF, WBMP, BMP, MBM and PNG formats.

Due to pilot projects in some select areas there also exists 7710 phones which contain an optional DVB-H tuner module. DVB-H wouldn't be complete for the consumer market until the Nokia N92 exactly a year after the 7710.

Considering the particularity of this model (big screen, without keys, touch screen), the Italian subsidiary of Nokia decided to arrange creative brainstorming to find a use for this phone "completely new". It was sold along with a satellite receiver and has been used as the first satellite navigation system on a touch screen mobile phone in the world.

== Specifications ==
Dimensions	128 x 69.5 x 19 mm, 142 cc
Weight	189 g
Display	3,5 inch TFT touchscreen, 65,536 colors, 640 x 320 pixels
GPRS	Class 10 (4+1/3+2 slots), 32–48 kbit/s
HSCSD	43.2 kbit/s
EDGE	Class 10, 236.8 kbit/s
Bluetooth	v1.2
USB	Yes, Pop-Port
Messaging	SMS, MMS, Email
Camera	1.3-0.99 megapixels depending on firmware (1280 x 1024 px - 1152 x 864 px), video (QCIF), (with update to firmware version 4.10, 1.3 megapixels)
CPU	ARM 168 MHz (source: Gsmarena)
Storage	MMC memory card (128 Mb–2 Gb) + 90 Mb internal memory
Operating System	Symbian OS v7.0s, Series 90 UI
Other Software	complete PIM suite: office applications (word processor, spreadsheet and PowerPoint viewer), E-mail client (SMTP, POP3, IMAP4); video and audio player, Java MIDP 2.0 apps
Browser	WAP/xHTML, HTML with Flash 6 support
Battery	lasts approx. 240–342 hours
