= Nokia 770 Internet Tablet =

Cell phone model

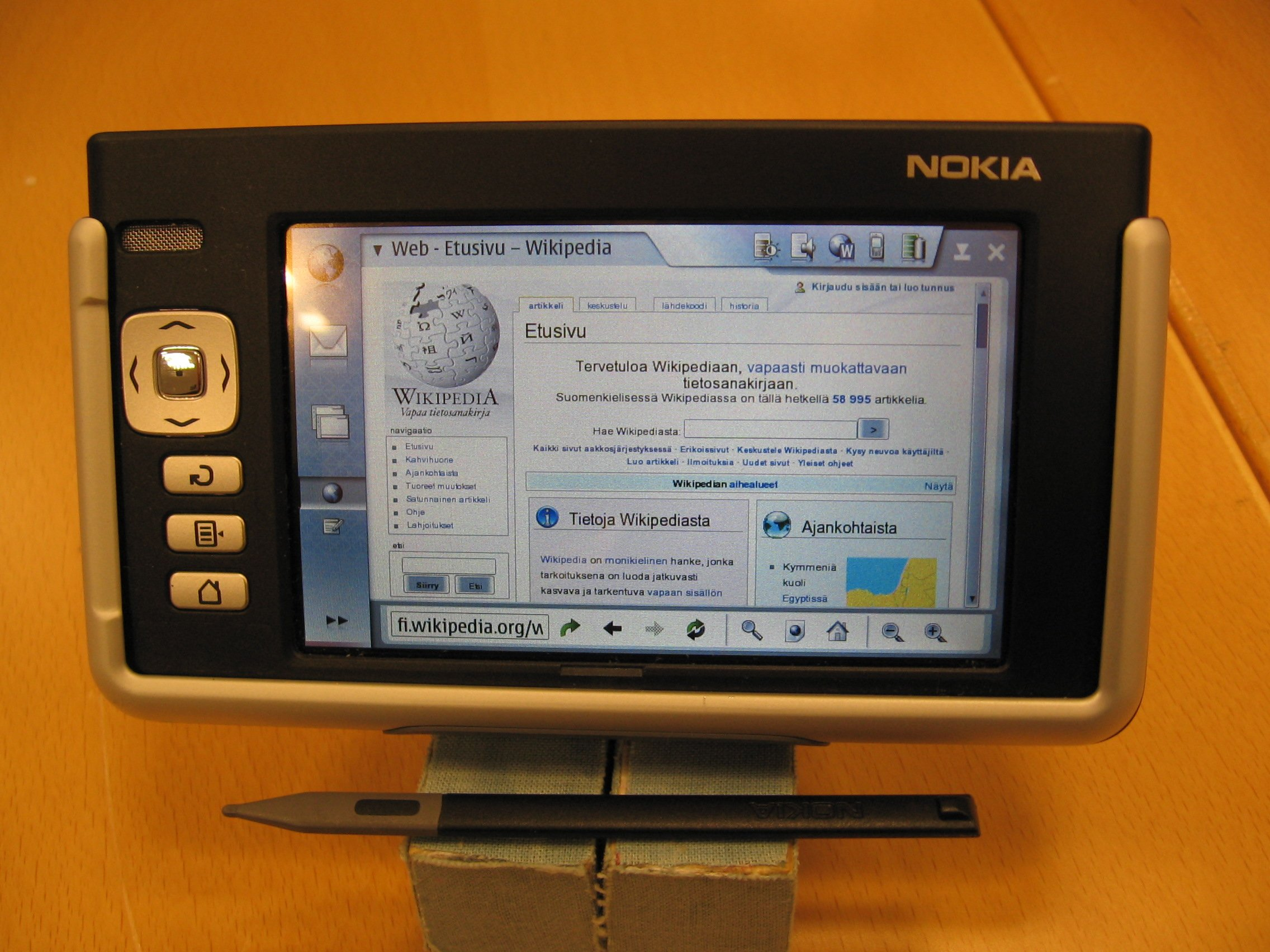
- Nokia 770 Internet Tablet running a browser displaying the Main Page of the Finnish Wikipedia
- Manufacturer: Nokia
- Type: Internet appliance
- Released: 3 November, 2005
- Media: RS-MMC or MMCmobile
- Operating system: Internet Tablet OS 2006 (Maemo 2.2)
- CPU: 252 MHz Texas Instruments OMAP 1710
- Memory: 64 MB random-access memory, 128 MB Flash
- Display: 800 × 480 resolution, 4.13 in diagonal, widescreen
- Input: Touchscreen
- Connectivity: IEEE 802.11g, Bluetooth
- Power: BP-5L Li-polymer 1500 mAh battery
- Predecessor: Nokia 7710
- Successor: Nokia N800

The Nokia 770 Internet Tablet was a wireless Internet appliance from Nokia, originally announced at the LinuxWorld Summit in New York City on 25 May 2005. It was designed for Wireless Internet browsing and email functions and includes software such as Internet radio, an RSS news reader, ebook reader, image viewer and media players for selected types of media.

The device went on sale in Europe on 3 November 2005, at a suggested retail price of €349 to €369 (£245 in the United Kingdom). In the United States, the device became available for purchase through Nokia USA's web site on 14 November 2005 for $359.99. On 8 January 2007, Nokia announced the Nokia N800, the successor to the 770. In July 2007, the price for the Nokia 770 fell to under US$150 / 150 EUR / 100 GBP.

== Specifications ==
- Dimensions: 141×79×19 mm (5.5×3.1×0.7 in)
- Weight: 230 g (8.1 oz) with protective cover or 185 g (6.5 oz) without.
- Processor: Texas Instruments OMAP 1710 CPU running at 252 MHz. It combines the ARM architecture of the ARM926TEJ core subsystem with a Texas Instruments TMS320C55x digital signal processor.
- Memory: 64 MB (64 × 2^{20} bytes) of DDR RAM, and 128 MB of internal flash memory, of which about 64 MB should be available to the user. Option for extended virtual memory (RS-MMC up to 1 GB (2 GB after flash upgrade)).
- Display and resolution: 4.1 inches, 800×480 pixels at 225 pixels per inch with up to 65,536 colors
- Connectivity: WLAN (IEEE 802.11b/g), Bluetooth 1.2, dial-up access, USB (both user-mode, and non-powered host-mode)
- Expansion: RS-MMC (both RS-MMC and DV-RS-MMC cards are supported).
- Audio: speaker and a microphone

The device was manufactured in Estonia and Germany.

== Maemo ==
The 770, like all Nokia Internet Tablets, runs Maemo, which is similar to many handheld operating systems and provides a "Home" screen—the central point from which all applications and settings are accessed. The home screen is divided into areas for launching applications, a menu bar, and a large customisable area that can display information such as an RSS reader, Internet radio player, and Google search box, for example. Maemo is a modified version of Debian.

The 770 is bundled with applications including the Opera web browser, Macromedia Flash and Gizmo.

A critical bug has been identified that causes memory corruption when using the WLAN connection. This could result in system instability and data corruption. Owners of the 770 are encouraged to apply the bugfix; preferably before having used the WLAN connection for the first time.

== Versatility ==
The Nokia 770 Internet Tablet appeals to people interested in hacking and DIY, as it is based on the Linux operating system and the open-source contribution from Nokia which gives more freedom to its users. Programmers used to port applications to the Maemo platform, thanks to which the catalogue of applications grows faster compared to similar devices. The inclusion of Wi-Fi, Bluetooth, and USB host functionality (through a hack) allows enthusiasts to expand their tablets to include USB mass storage, Bluetooth GPS receivers, a normal USB keyboard, or other devices.

== Criticism ==
The Nokia 770 has received criticism from some technology reviewers. The most common complaint was about the overall speed of the system, due to the relatively slow CPU and the size of the on-board memory (64 MiB). Short battery life (less than 4 hours in the case of continuous Wi-Fi usage) was also a concern. Some reviews suggested problems with the handwriting recognition, and some said tapping the on-screen keyboard was too slow.

Another common complaint was that it lacked the functions of a mobile PDA, although there are now several PIM options created by the community. Also, for Internet access away from Wi-Fi hotspots, the Nokia 770 relies upon a Bluetooth 1.2 phone acting as a modem, and not all bluetooth phones will work with the tablet. Additionally, the device used Reduced-Size MMC (RS-MMC or Micro-MMC) cards that were originally difficult to find. However, the format has since been used in other products and has become widely available. The device originally could only use cards up to 1 GB, but 2 GB cards are supported with the current version of the operating system.

== See also ==
- Nokia N800, the successor to the Nokia 770
- Nokia N810
- Nokia N900
- Nokia N950
- Nokia N9
