= Nokia N810 =

2007 tablet computer from Nokia

Nokia N810 Internet Tablet
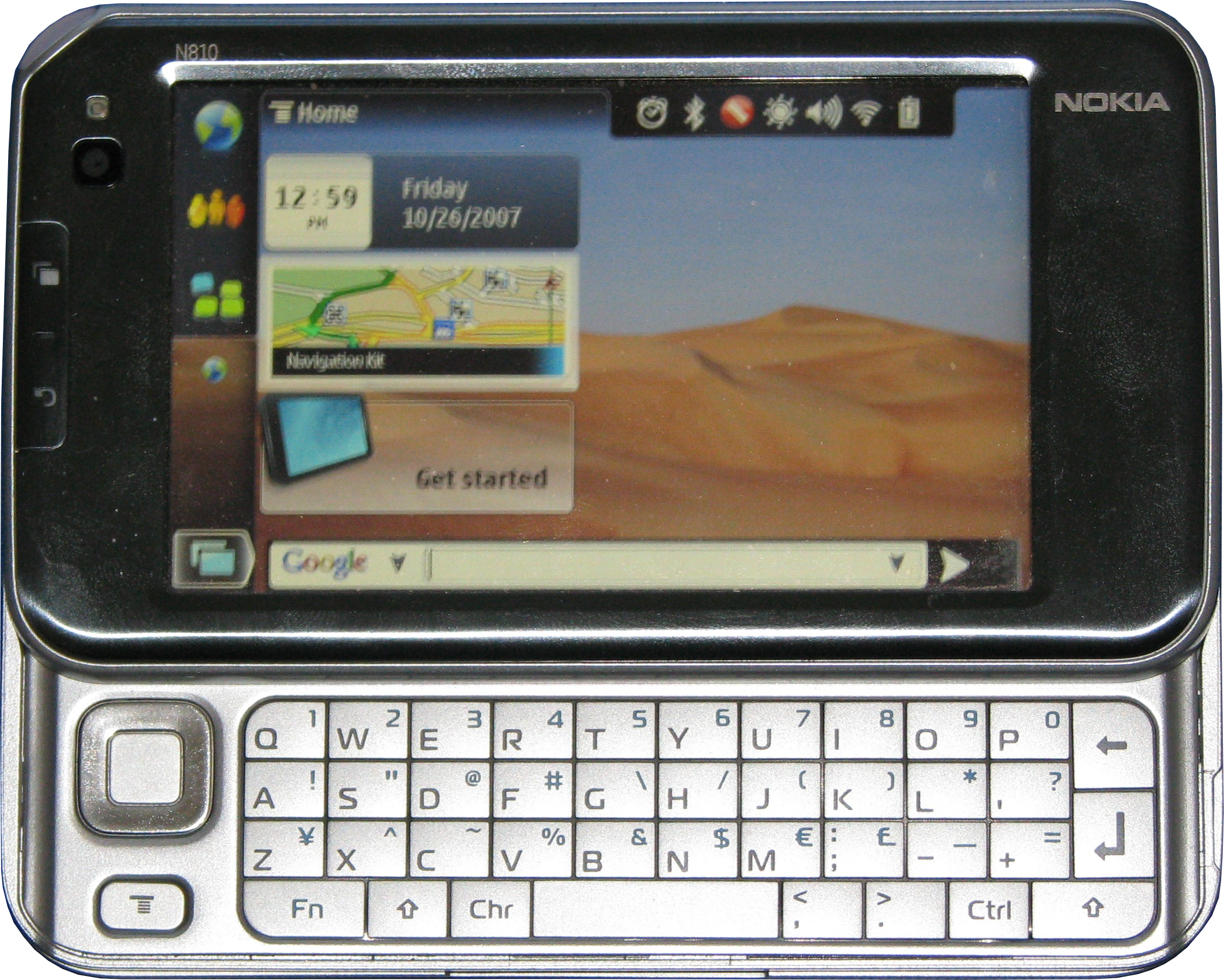
- Manufacturer: Nokia
- Type: Internet appliance
- Released: November 2007
- Media: One miniSD slot, compatible with miniSD or microSD (with adapter) cards up to 8 GB
- Operating system: Maemo 4.1 (codename Diablo)
- CPU: 400 MHz TI OMAP 2420
- Memory: 128 MB Random access memory
- Storage: 256 MB + 2 GB Flash
- Display: 800 × 480 resolution, 105 mm (4.13 in) diagonal, 88 pixels/cm, 225 ppi, 65536 colors (16-bit)
- Input: Keyboard/Resistive Touchscreen
- Camera: 640 × 480 VGA Camera (currently supports photos and video)
- Connectivity: IEEE 802.11b, IEEE 802.11g, Bluetooth 2.0, USB 2.0
- Power: 1500 mAh BP-4L Battery
- Dimensions: 72 * 128 * 14 mm
- Weight: 226 g
- Predecessor: Nokia N800
- Successor: Nokia N900

The Nokia N810 Internet tablet is an Internet appliance from Nokia, announced on 17 October 2007 at the Web 2.0 Summit in San Francisco. Despite Nokia's strong association with cellular products, the N810, like preceding tablets produced by Nokia, was not a phone, but instead allowed the user to browse the Internet and communicate using Wi-Fi networks or with a mobile phone via Bluetooth. It built on the hardware and software of the Nokia N800 with some features added and some removed.

The Nokia N810 featured the Maemo Linux distribution operating system based on Maemo 4.0, which featured MicroB (a Mozilla-based mobile browser), a GPS navigation application, new media player, and a refreshed interface.

== Major changes from the N800 ==
The Nokia N810 had much in common with the N800 and Internet Tablet OS 2008 operated on both, but there were some significant differences between the two. Here are the new features in the Nokia N810:

- Sliding, backlit keyboard
- Front-facing webcam (replacing pop-out rotating device)
- Ambient Light Sensor
- Integrated GPS
- 2 GB integrated internal storage
- MiniSDHC card slot (replacing two full-size SDHC slots, one internal, one external) | Maximum: 32 GB
- Sunlight readable transflective display
- USB Micro-AB receptacle (replacing a USB Mini-B receptacle)
- No longer has an FM tuner

== Nokia N810 WiMAX Edition ==
On 1 April 2008, Nokia announced a WiMAX equipped version of the N810 called the "N810 WiMAX Edition". This device was to be identical in specifications to the original N810 but included a WiMAX radio for use initially on Sprint's Xohm network, and featured a color change from Light Gray or dark blue to Black, as well as a larger case-back bulge to accommodate an antenna that was more efficient at the required bands.

The production of the Wimax Edition of the Nokia N810 ended in January 2009.

== Maemo ==
The N810, like all Nokia Internet Tablets, ran Maemo, which was similar to many handheld operating systems, and provided a "Home" screen – the central point from which all applications and settings were accessed. The Home screen was divided into areas for launching applications, a menu bar, and a large customisable area that could display information such as an RSS reader, Internet radio player, and Google search box. Maemo was a modified version of Debian Linux.

The N810 was bundled with several applications including the Mozilla-based MicroB browser, Adobe Flash, Gizmo, and Skype.

Mobile Firefox "Fennec" was also made available for N810, and promised to make users "forget about the clunky, stripped-down mobile Web you're used to". Installation added the Mozilla repository to the Application Manager, allowing automatic notification of updates.

== See also ==
- Mobile Internet Device
- Nokia 770
- Nokia N800
- Nokia N900
- Nokia Lumia 2520
