= Nokia N800 =

Internet appliance by Nokia

Nokia N800 Internet Tablet
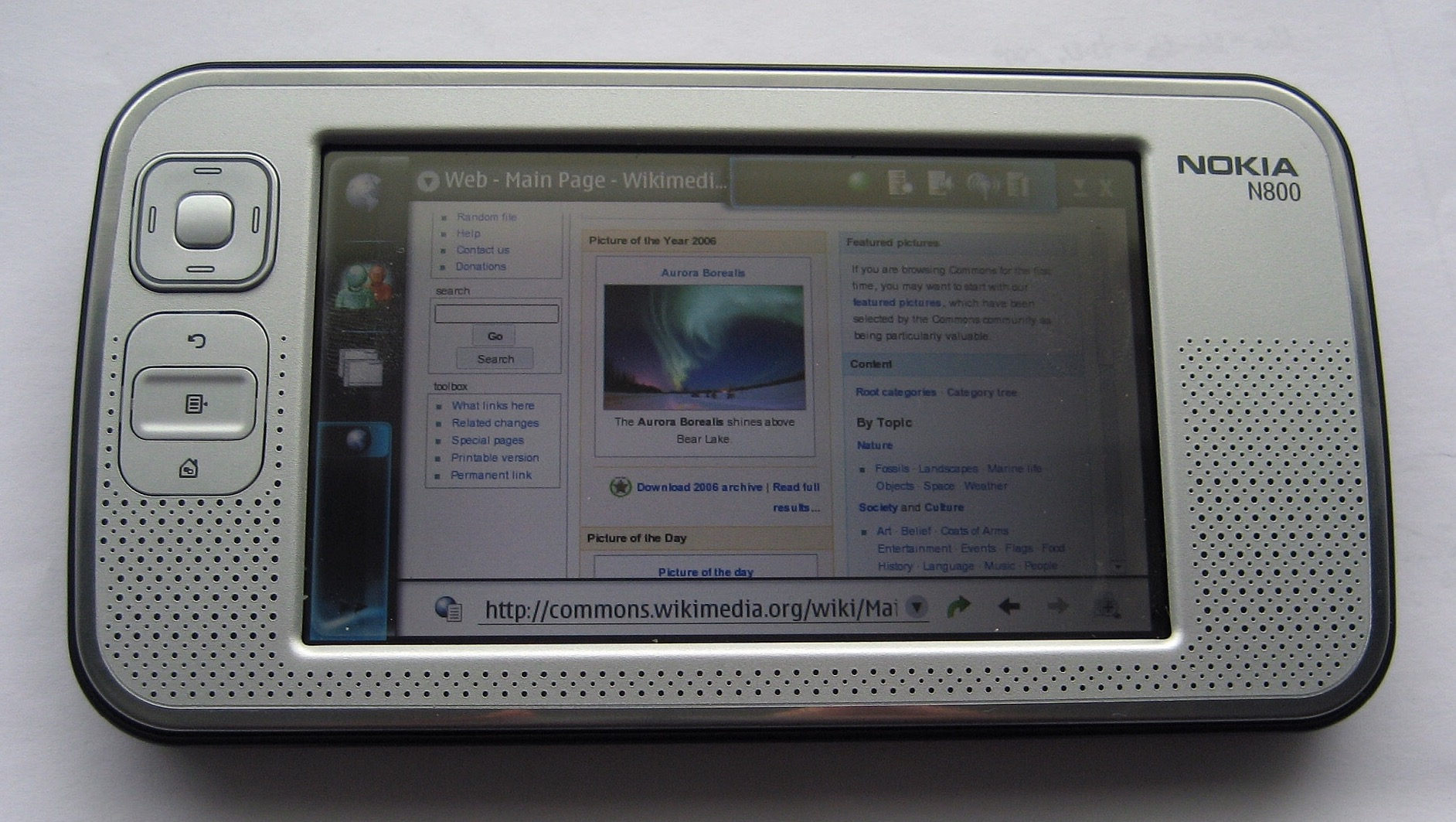
- Manufacturer: Nokia
- Type: Internet appliance
- Lifespan: January 2007
- Media: Two slots, SD with SDHC support. Or (microSD, miniSD, MMC, or RS-MMC) via SD adapter.
- Operating system: Internet Tablet OS 2008 (Maemo 4.0)
- CPU: 330 MHz TI OMAP 2420 (400 MHz after updating to OS2008)
- Memory: 128 MB Random Access Memory, up to 64 GB Flash with OS2008 upgrade
- Display: 800 × 480 resolution, 105 mm (4.13 in) diagonal, 88 pixels/cm, 225 ppi, 65536 colors (16-bit)
- Input: Resistive Touchscreen and 5-Button D-Pad
- Camera: 640 × 480 VGA Camera (currently supports photos and video)
- Connectivity: IEEE 802.11, Bluetooth 2.0, USB 2.0
- Power: BP-5L Li-Po 1500 mAh Battery
- Dimensions: 75 × 144 × 13 (/18) mm
- Weight: 206 g (0.5 lb)
- Predecessor: Nokia 7710; Nokia 770 Internet Tablet
- Successor: Nokia N810

The Nokia N800 Internet tablet was a wireless Internet appliance from Nokia, originally announced at the Las Vegas CES 2007 Summit in January 2007. The device allows the user to browse the Internet and communicate using Wi-Fi networks or with mobile phone via Bluetooth. The N800 was developed as the successor to the Nokia 770. It includes FM and Internet radio, an RSS news reader, image viewer and a media player for audio and video files.

== Specifications ==
- Processor: OMAP2420 microprocessor with a native speed of 400 MHz
  - Runs at an underclocked 330 MHz on OS2007, because the DSP speed will be halved if run at full speed
  - Runs at the native 400 MHz on OS2008.
- Memory: 128 MiB of RAM and 256 MiB of flash memory.
- Connectivity: IEEE 802.11 b/g, Bluetooth 2.0 (DUN, OPP, FTP, HFP, HID profiles as well as A2DP/AVRCP and PAN via third party emulation), and USB 2.0 OTG high-speed.
- Display & resolution: pressure-sensitive resistive touch-screen LCD 4.1 inches 800×480 pixels at 225 dpi (the same as the 770.)
  - includes PowerVR MBX acceleration, but the operating system does not include a device driver
- Expansion: 2 full-sized Secure Digital card slots, one internal and one external, each accommodating one card up to 32 GB capacity when using SDHC. Only cards up to 8 GB are officially supported by Nokia.
- Camera: built-in pop-up rotating webcam. (note the camera does not rotate a full 360 degrees).
- Audio: microphone, stereo speakers, FM radio tuner, 3.5-mm headphone jack (compatible with standard stereo headphones, but also containing a fourth pin with microphone input). The headphone jack also functions as the antenna for the FM radio.
- Operating system: Linux-based Internet Tablet OS 2007. In December 2007 the new OS 2008 was released for the Nokia N800 and the Nokia N810.
- The N800 supports Skype internet calls and Flash Player 9 as of 6 July 2007, which allows users to watch YouTube videos, play online flash games, and make free internet calls to other Skype-enabled devices.

Note that the USB port uses a mini-B socket instead of mini-AB so that a specially grounded adaptor is required to make full use of the USB OTG client/host auto-switching. Switching can be done in software with regular adaptors, though. USB OTG only provides 100 mA of current (versus full-size USB's 500 mA), so devices with larger current requirements will need to be used with a powered USB hub.

== Maemo ==
The N800, like all Nokia Internet Tablets, ran Maemo, which was similar to many handheld operating systems, and provided a "Home" screen—the central point from which all applications and settings are accessed. The Home screen was divided into areas for launching applications, a menu bar, and a large customisable area that can display information such as an RSS reader, Internet radio player, and Google search box for example. Maemo was a modified version of Debian.

The N800 was bundled with several applications including the Mozilla-based MicroB browser, Macromedia Flash, Gizmo, and Skype. The N800 used Maemo OS that comes with a number of built-in applications, but additional applications can be installed from a number of sources, including official and community sources.

== See also ==
- Internet appliance
