= Alcatel One Touch Fire E =

Firefox OS smartphone

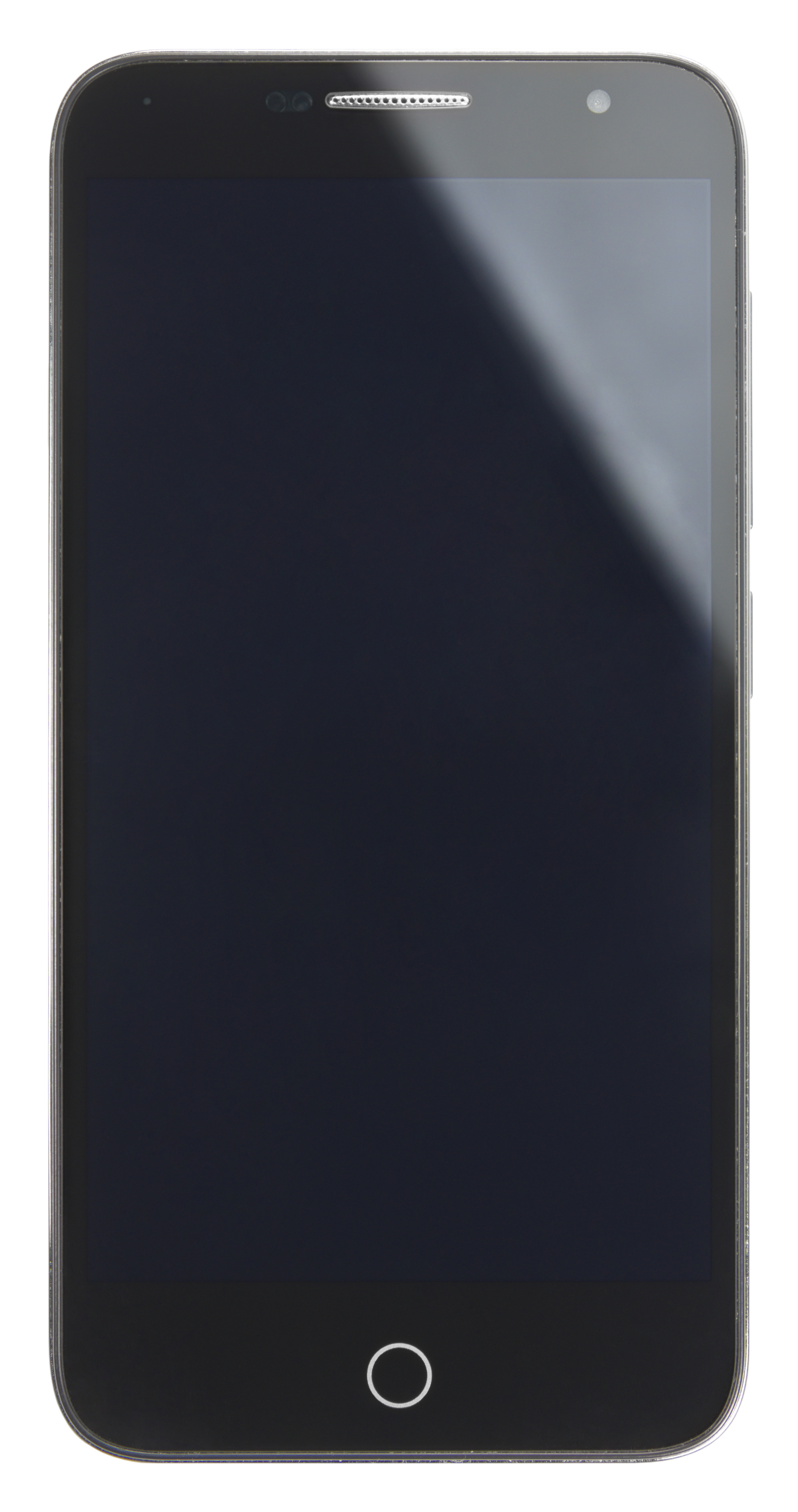
- Brand: Alcatel Mobile
- Manufacturer: TCL Communication
- Type: Smartphone
- Series: Alcatel Fire series
- First released: February 23, 2014
- Discontinued: Yes
- Predecessor: Alcatel One Touch Fire
- Compatible networks: GSM, HSPA
- Form factor: Slate
- Colors: Slate; Dark Chocolate; Mozilla Orange
- Dimensions: 129.00×63.50×8.20 mm (5.079×2.500×0.323 in)
- Weight: 103 g (3.6 oz)
- Operating system: Firefox OS 1.3
- System-on-chip: Qualcomm Snapdragon 200 (MSM8210)
- CPU: Dual-core 1.2 GHz
- GPU: Adreno 302
- Memory: 512 MB RAM
- Storage: 4 GB
- Removable storage: microSDHC (dedicated slot)
- SIM: Micro-SIM
- Battery: Removable Li-Ion 1700 mAh
- Rear camera: 5 MP, AF; LED flash, HDR; Video: 720p@30fps
- Front camera: VGA
- Display: 4.5 in (110 mm) IPS LCD; 540 x 960 pixels, 16:9 ratio (~245 ppi density)
- Model: 6015

The Alcatal One Touch Fire E is a Firefox OS-based smartphone manufactured by Alcatel under its main manufacturer TCL Communication. It was unveiled on February 22, 2014, at MWC 2014 in Barcelona, Spain.

== Specifications ==
=== Design ===
The Alcatel Fire E features a lightweight and compact plastic form factor. It measures 129 × 63.5 × 8.2 mm (5.08 × 2.5 × 0.32 in) and weighs only 103 g (3.63 oz), making it comfortable for single-handed use. It supports a single Micro-SIM configuration. The device was launched in three primary color schemes: Slate, Dark Chocolate, and Mozilla Orange.

=== Hardware ===
The device is powered by a 1.2 GHz dual-core processor. It comes equipped with 512 MB of RAM and 4 GB of internal storage, which can be expanded further via a dedicated microSDHC card slot. The smartphone has a removable 1,700 mAh lithium-ion battery.

=== Display ===
The handset features a 4.5-inch IPS LCD touchscreen display with a screen-to-body ratio of approximately 68.1%. The panel has a resolution of 540 × 960 pixels at a standard 16:9 aspect ratio, translating to a pixel density of roughly 245 ppi.

=== Cameras ===
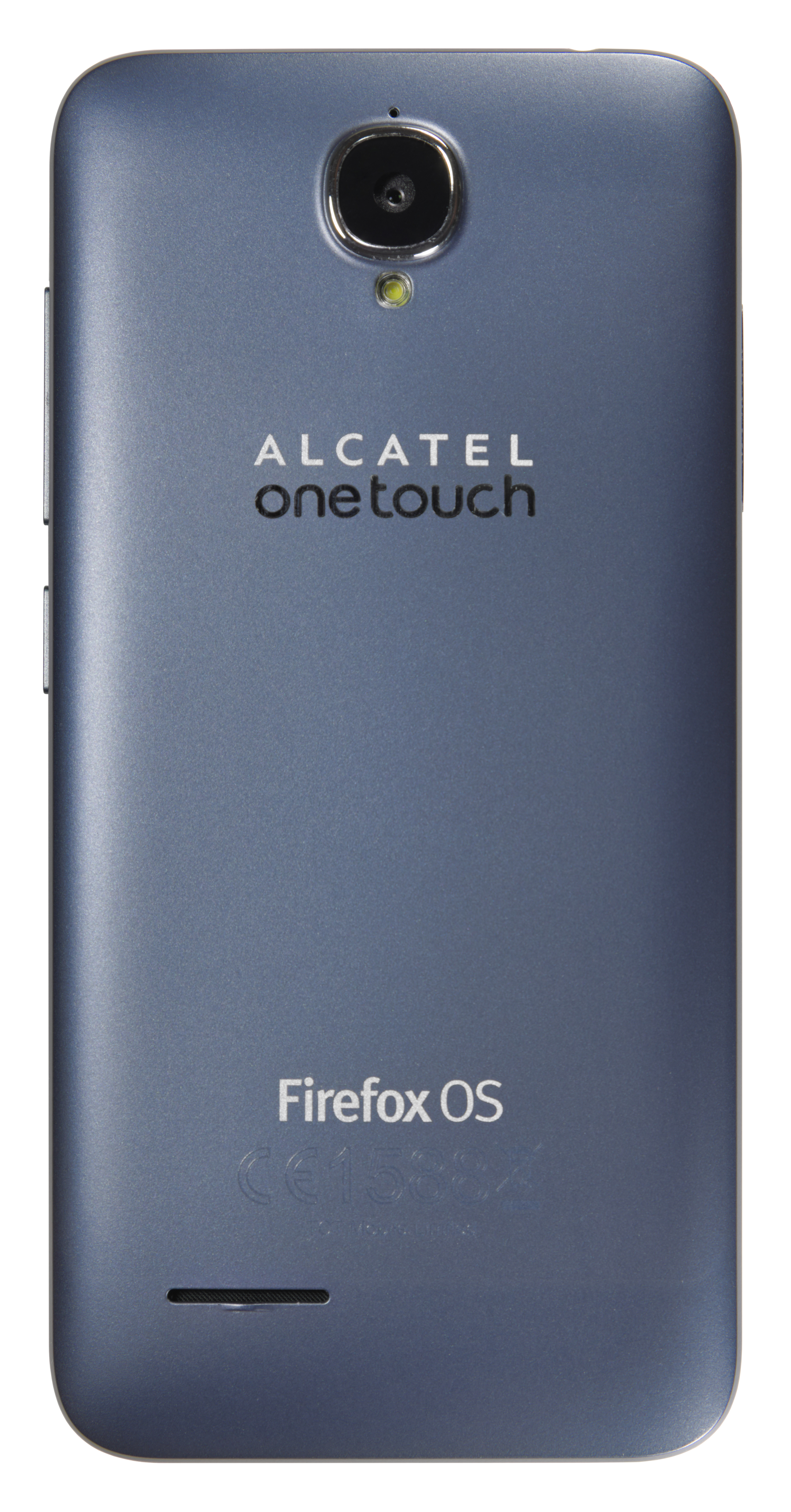
The back side of the phone with its primary 5-megapixel camera

For photography, the Alcatel Fire E houses a single 5-megapixel primary rear camera with autofocus support, a dedicated LED flash, and high-dynamic-range (HDR) imaging capabilities. This rear-facing camera is capable of recording video at a resolution of 720p at 30 frames per second. On the front of the device, it features basic VGA-resolution camera.

=== Software ===
The smartphone was shipped running Firefox OS 1.3 as its default operating system. Built on Mozilla's Gecko layout engine, the software relies on web technologies like HTML5, CSS3, and JavaScript to run mobile applications directly inside a web-based runtime environment. The interface comes preloaded with standard digital tools, including predictive text input, a photo viewer, a dedicated media player supporting MP3/AAC/WAV and MP4/H.264 formats, and an FM radio with RDS.
