= Alcatel One Touch Evolve =

2013 mobile phone

Alcatel OneTouch Evolve
- Brand: Alcatel
- Manufacturer: TCL
- Series: OneTouch
- First released: October 16, 2013
- Successor: Alcatel OneTouch Evolve 2
- Related: Alcatel OneTouch Fierce
- Compatible networks: GSM / HSPA
- Color: Black
- Dimensions: 121.5 mm (4.78 in) H 64 mm (2.5 in) W 11.8 mm (0.46 in) D
- Weight: 136.5 g (4.81 oz)
- Operating system: Android 4.1 "Jelly Bean"
- System-on-chip: MediaTek MT6575
- CPU: 1.0 GHz single-core ARM Cortex-A9
- GPU: PowerVR SGX531
- Memory: 512 MB RAM
- Storage: 4 GB
- Removable storage: microSDHC up to 32 GB
- Battery: 1,400 mAh Li-ion
- Rear camera: 5 MP; Video: 720p
- Front camera: 0.3 MP (VGA)
- Display: 4.0 in (100 mm) TFT LCD; Resolution: 800 x 480 pixels, 233 ppi
- Connectivity: Wi-Fi 802.11 b/g/n, Bluetooth 4.0, Micro-USB, A-GPS
- Data inputs: List: Accelerometer; Compass; Ambient light sensor; Proximity sensor

The Alcatel OneTouch Evolve is a touchscreen Android smartphone manufactured by TCL under the brand Alcatel Mobile. It was released on October 5, 2013 on T-Mobile and in online retailers.

It was also released a high-end OneTouch with 4.5-inch display - the OneTouch Fierce.

== Specifications ==
=== Hardware ===
The Alcatel OneTouch Evolve is powered by a MediaTek MT6575 system chip, featuring a 1 GHz single-core ARM Cortex-A9 processor and a PowerVR SGX531 GPU. It includes 512 MB of RAM and 4 GB of internal storage, which can be expanded by up to 32 GB via a microSDHC card. The device is equipped with a 4.0-inch TFT display with a resolution of 800x480 pixels (233 PPI).

It runs on a 1400 mAh lithium-ion battery and includes several sensors such as an accelerometer, ambient light sensor, proximity sensor, and a compass.

=== Cameras ===
The device features a 5-megapixel rear-facing camera capable of 720p video recording. On the front, it has a 0.3-megapixel VGA camera for basic video calling and self-portraits.

=== Software ===
The OneTouch Evolve launched with the Android 4.1 Jelly Bean operating system. It includes standard features such as voice dialing, voice commands, and OTA (Over-the-Air) synchronization. The software also supports various multimedia functions, including an FM radio with RDS and background music playback.

== Reception ==
PCMag reviewer Patrick Austin noticed positive features of the display like decent brightness in outdoors and text readability. Aside from the mobile operating system, the app icons are revised by the manufacturer, stating "Though it's running a not terribly aged Android 4.1.2 Jelly Bean, many of the icons have been altered by Alcatel, and look a little more childish."

CNET reviewer Sarah Mitroff stated that the OneTouch Evolve was "underpowered" due to the lack of 4G connectivity. In terms of display, the resolution sharpness is poor, with dimness when set to maximum brightness.
