= Alcatel One Touch 501 =

Mobile phone

One Touch 501
- Manufacturer: Alcatel
- Availability by region: 1999
- Compatible networks: GSM-900 / GSM-1800
- Form factor: Block
- Dimensions: 103×42×23.9 mm (4.06×1.65×0.94 in)
- Weight: 103 g (4 oz)
- Memory: Up to 1000 names in phonebook
- Battery: 600 mAh
- Rear camera: None
- Display: 96 x 64 pixels, Monochrome
- Connectivity: None

Alcatel OT 501 (or One Touch 501) is a mobile phone, with dual band, featuring a WAP browser (but not GPRS). It can handle a Li-Pol battery, has voice control, and monochromatic display (up to 8 lines), service menu (000000* to activate) and built-in handsfree. It has battery life of up to 7 days, if turned off during the night. The specifications state it has 320 hours standby time and 5 hours talk time. The OT 500 and OT 502 are very similar models. The One Touch 501 was released in December 1999 and is no longer sold by Alcatel.
