= Alcatel One Touch 990 =

Android smartphone

- Brand: Alcatel
- Manufacturers: TCL Communication (ALCATEL ONE TOUCH)
- Type: Touchscreen smartphone
- Series: One Touch
- First released: Russia/Georgia; 29 November 2011; 14 years ago
- Availability by region: Launch date dependent on country, beginning on October 29, 2011
- Predecessor: Alcatel One Touch 918
- Successor: Alcatel One Touch 995
- Compatible networks: 2G, 3G, Wi-Fi
- Operating system: Android 2.2.2 (Froyo) (can be upgraded to Android 2.3.4 Gingerbread, via One Touch Upgrade), with Alcatel Application List Ultra
- CPU: Qualcomm 600 MHz CPU (MSM7227 ARM11 processor)
- Memory: 700 MB RAM
- Removable storage: microSD card (up to 32 GB)
- Rear camera: 5 megapixels with auto focus
- Front camera: VGA
- Display: touchscreen, 3.5-inch display
- Connectivity: Wi-Fi, mobile hotspot capable, Bluetooth v2.0
- Data inputs: Touchscreen
- Other: Headset: 3.5 mm audio jack FM radio (87.5-108MHz) with RDS; Built-in GPS module

Alcatel One Touch 990 is an Android 2.2 froyo touchscreen smartphone, from Alcatel One Touch series, phone has 5-megapixel camera with autofocus and LED flash. An off-line upgrade to 2.3 is available for many variants.

== Specifications ==
=== Hardware ===
The Alcatel One Touch 990 has a 3.5-inch TFT capacitive touchscreen display, 150 MB of internal storage that can be expanded using microSD cards up to 32 GB. The phone has a 1300 mAh Li-ion battery, 5 MP rear camera with a selfie camera. It is available in Bluish black, Auberguine, Spicy red colors.

=== Software ===
Alcatel One Touch 990 ships with Android 2.2 (Froyo), and as said, can be upgraded to Android 2.3.4 (Gingerbread).

== Availability ==
Phone is available in Canada, Croatia, Georgia, Russia, Ukraine, Spain, Montenegro, Hungary, Serbia, Chile, Poland, United States, Australia, India, Dominican Republic and United Kingdom.
