= Alcatel One Touch 300 =

Mobile phone model

The Alcatel OT 300 is a discontinued, low range mobile phone created by Alcatel and was introduced in Q1 2000. It weighs 103 g (3.6 oz) and its dimensions are 109 mm × 45 mm × 22 mm (4.29 in × 1.77 in × 0.87 in), 99 cc (6.0 cu in). Its monochrome screen has a maximum resolution of 49×96 pixels and the phone includes a NiMH 650 mAh rechargeable battery giving it a standby time of 165 hours.

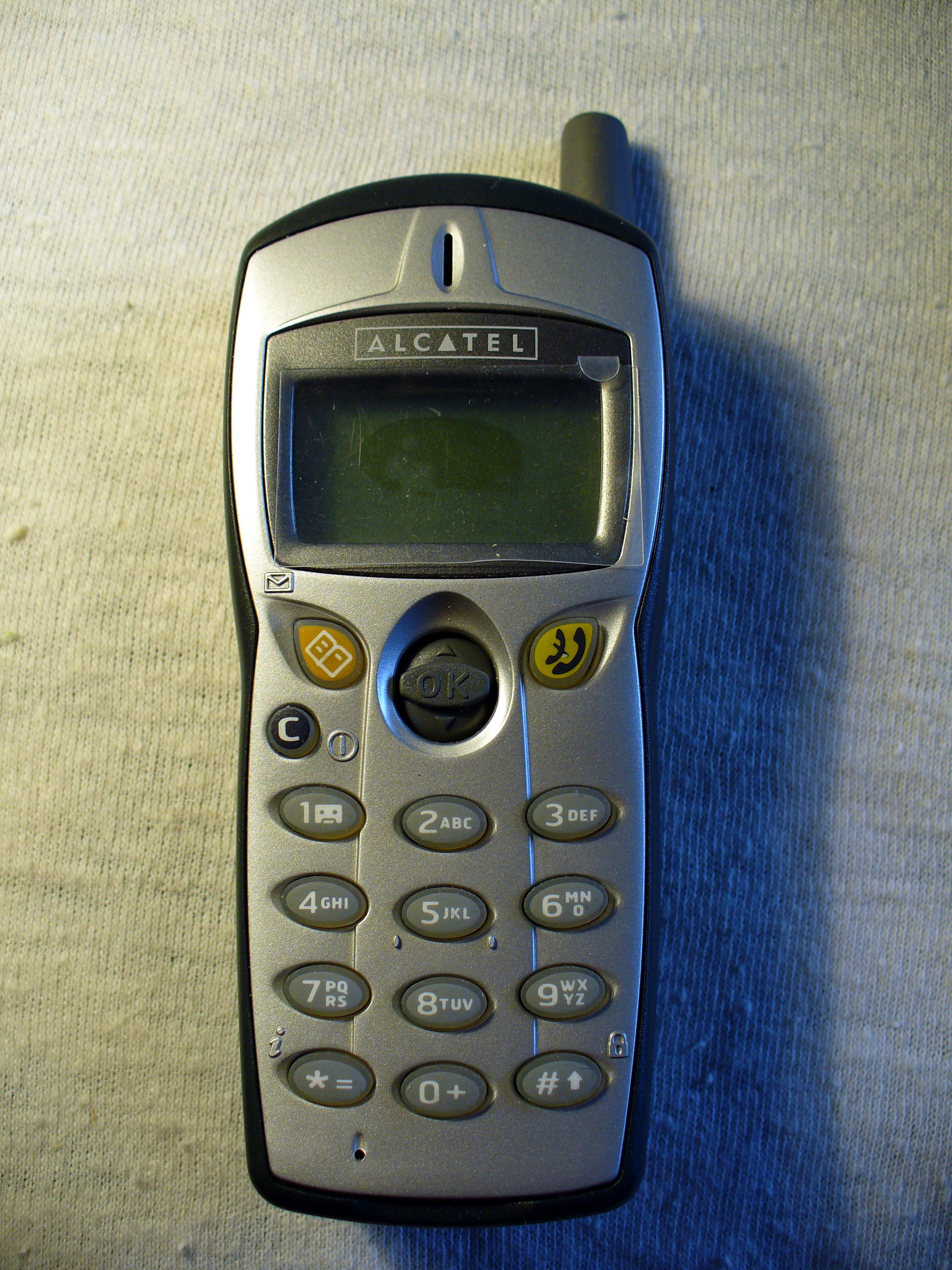
Alcatel OT 300 series

Related models are OT 301, OT 302 and OT 303. It's being referred as the Alcatel BE-4 on the label.
