= Alcatel One Touch Fire =

Mobile phone model

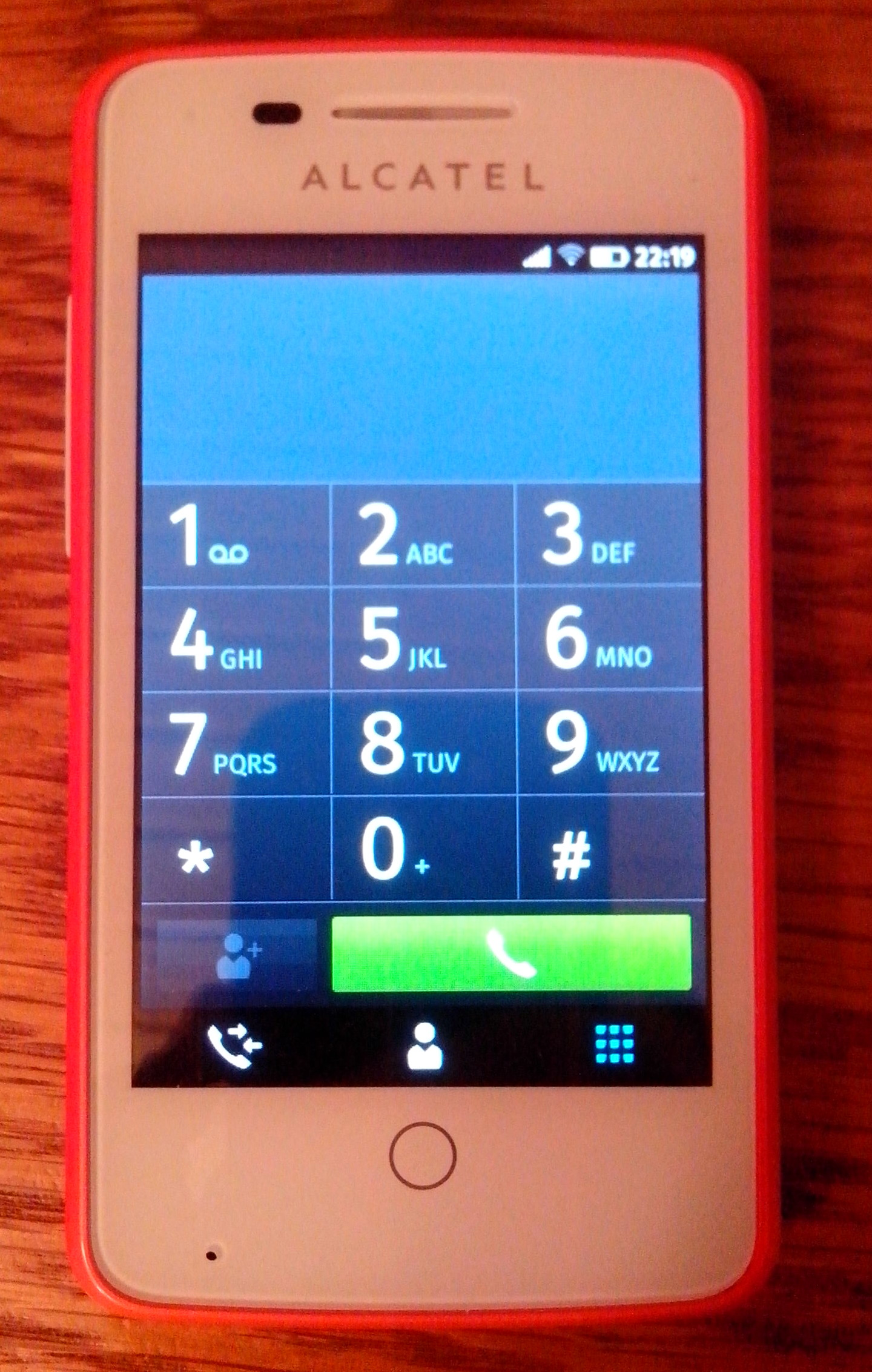
- Brand: Alcatel Mobile Phones
- Manufacturer: TCL Corporation
- Type: Smartphone
- Series: One Touch Fire
- First released: 12 July 2013; 12 years ago
- Successor: Alcatel One Touch Fire C
- Related: Alcatel One Touch T'Pop
- Compatible networks: 4012A GSM 850/900/1800/1900 (GPRS, EDGE) UMTS 850/1900/2100 4012X UMTS 900/2100 (HSDPA, HSUPA)
- Form factor: Slate
- Dimensions: 115 mm (4.5 in) H 62.3 mm (2.45 in) W 12.2 mm (0.48 in) D
- Weight: 108 g (3.8 oz)
- Operating system: Firefox OS
- System-on-chip: Snapdragon S1 MSM7227A
- CPU: ARM Cortex-A5
- GPU: Adreno 200
- Memory: 256 MB
- Storage: 512 MB
- Removable storage: 2 GB (max. 32 GB)
- Battery: 1400 mAh
- Rear camera: 3.2 MP
- Front camera: None
- Display: 3.5", 320x480 (HVGA), 165 ppi
- Sound: Speaker, 3.5mm audio jack, vibration
- Connectivity: Micro USB 2.0, Bluetooth 3.0 with A2DP, 802.11 b/g/n WiFi
- Data inputs: Multi-touch capacitative touchscreen, push-buttons, microphone, accelerometer, accelerometer, proximity sensor, gyroscope, assisted GPS, stereo FM radio
- Model: 4012 (4012A, 4012X)
- SAR: 4012A Head: 1.45 W/kg Body: 1.30 W/kg 4012X Head: 1.16 W/kg Body: 1.18 W/kg
- Website: www.alcatelonetouch.com/global-en/products/smartphones/one_touch_fire.html
- References: "Alcatel One Touch Fire". Alcatel.com. Alcatel Mobile Phones. Archived from the original on 2 July 2014.

The Alcatel One Touch Fire was one of the first smartphones preinstalled with Firefox OS, a discontinued open-source mobile operating system developed by Mozilla.

The phone was developed and marketed by Alcatel Mobile Phones as a lower-cost, entry-level smartphone for specific Latin American and European countries: Brazil, Chile, Colombia, Mexico, Peru, Uruguay, and Venezuela in Latin America; and Germany, Greece, Hungary, Italy, Montenegro, Poland, and Serbia in Europe. Mobile network operators who have carried the phone include Congstar (Germany), Cosmote (Greece), Movistar (Chile, Mexico, Peru, Uruguay, Venezuela), T-Mobile (Hungary, Montenegro, Macedonia), Telcel (Mexico), Telenor (Serbia and Montenegro), Telecom Italia Mobile (Italy), and Vivo (Brazil).

The One Touch Fire is a variation of an earlier, Android-based smartphone, the Alcatel One Touch T'Pop. Unlike the One Touch Fire, the One Touch T'Pop uses an ARM Cortex-A9 CPU and a PowerVR SGX531 GPU; it also incorporates "home" and "back" push-buttons, distinct cosmetics, and other differences. The One Touch Fire is sold in three color schemes: Mozilla Orange, Apple Green, and Pure White.

There are two model numbers for the One Touch Fire: 4012A and 4012X, which support different cellular network standards and frequency bands for different countries. The 4012A has a quadband GSM radio that can communicate at 850, 900, 1800, or 1900 MHz; and a UMTS radio capable of 850, 1900, and 2100 MHz communication. The 4012X has only a UMTS radio that communicates at 900 or 2100 MHz. Consequently, the 4012X has a lower specific absorption rate.

The 4012A and 4012X are succeeded by the One Touch Fire C, One Touch Fire E, and One Touch Fire S.

== See also ==
- Comparison of Firefox OS devices
