= Alcatel One Touch Idol 3 =

Mobile phone model

The Alcatel One Touch Idol 3 4.7 and 5.5 are Android smartphones manufactured by TCL Mobile and officially unveiled at 2015’s Mobile World Congress. The Idol 3 4.7 features a 4.7” display while the Idol 3 5.5 has a larger 5.5” display. They were the first smartphones to come with a reversible design that allows a user to use a phone upside-down.

== Specifications ==
=== Hardware ===
Both models feature JBL-certified stereo front-facing speakers, a 13-megapixel rear camera, a reversible design and displays tuned by Technicolor. The phone is available in Soft Gold, Metallic Silver and Dark Grey, and in single-SIM and dual-SIM versions.

Idol 3 4.7 features a 4.7” display with a resolution of 1280 x 720 pixels (312 ppi). It has a Qualcomm Snapdragon 410 SoC clocked at 1.2 GHz alongside an Adreno 306 GPU and 1.5 GB of RAM. It is powered by a 2000 mAh non-removable Li-ion battery and it is available in 8 GB single-SIM and 16 GB dual-SIM versions.

Idol 3 5.5 features a 5.5” display with a resolution of 1920 x 1080 pixels (401 ppi). It has a Qualcomm Snapdragon 615 SoC composed of a quad-core 1.5 GHz Cortex-A53 and a quad-core 1.0 GHz Cortex-A53 alongside an Adreno 405 GPU and 2 GB of RAM. It is powered by a 2910 mAh non-removable Li-ion battery and it is available in 16 GB single-SIM and 32 GB dual-SIM versions.

=== Software ===
The Idol 3 line up comes with Android 5.0.2 Lollipop with customized icons and a few added features such as the option to use the phone upside-down and FM radio. The phone can be upgraded as far as Android Marshmallow 6.0.
