= Alcatel One Touch 808 =

Alcatel OT-808
- Brand: Alcatel
- Manufacturer: Alcatel
- Type: Feature phone
- First released: February 11, 2010
- Compatible networks: GSM 900 / 1800 (OT-808) / GSM 850 / 1900 (OT-808A)
- Form factor: Clamshell / QWERTY flip phone
- Colors: Dark Chrome; Pink Chrome
- Dimensions: 70.6 mm (2.78 in) H 70.6 mm (2.78 in) W 20.7 mm (0.81 in) D
- Weight: 113 g (4.0 oz)
- Operating system: Alcatel Proprietary (MediaTek MAUI / Nucleus RTOS)
- System-on-chip: MediaTek MT6235BSA
- CPU: 208 MHz ARM926EJ-S
- Memory: 64 MB LPDDR
- Storage: 80 MB
- Removable storage: microSDHC, up to 8GB
- SIM: Mini SIM
- Battery: Removable Li-Ion 850 mAh
- Charging: Mini USB / microUSB 2.0
- Rear camera: 2 MP, fixed focus
- Front camera: None
- Display: Primary: 2.4-inch TFT, 320 x 240 pixels (4:3 ratio, ~167 ppi); Secondary: 1.1-inch monochrome OLED, 128 x 36 pixels
- Model: OT-808
- References: Alcatel OT-808 Full Specifications - PhoneArena

The Alcatel OT-808 (One Touch 808) is a handheld device with QWERTY keypad manfactured by Alcatel and released in February 2010 at the MWC 2010 at Barcelona. It features a 2.4-inch TFT display, a 2MP rear facing camera supporting H.263 and MPEG-4 videos, a microSD card up to 8GB a calculator, a voice recorder, an MP3 player and an FM radio.

It measures at 71 mm x 21 mm x 71 mm.
