= Alcatel Mobile =

Brand of mobile phones

Alcatel
- Product type: Mobile telephones
- Current owner: Nokia
- Produced by: TCL Communication Technology (TCT) (part of TCL Technology)
- Country: France (originally)
- Introduced: 1991
- Discontinued: October 17, 2024; 2 years ago
- Markets: Worldwide
- Website: alcatelmobile.com

Alcatel is a brand of mobile handsets owned by Finnish telecommunications company Nokia and used under license by Chinese electronics company TCL Technology. The brand originates with former French conglomerate Alcatel, which began building mobile phones from at least 1991. At the time known as Alcatel One Touch, the brand was licensed in 2005 to TCL, who have ever since held sole rights from Alcatel's successors, Alcatel-Lucent and Nokia, having produced various handsets as well as other handheld devices mostly in the budget sector.

== Brand and company history ==
Alcatel/CGE introduced its first cellular phone in the 1980s under France's analog network. As of 1996, Alcatel sold approximately one million mobile phone handsets. Handsets were manufactured in France at factories in Illkirch and Laval. In the year 1998, Alcatel became the 5th largest global mobile phone maker with a share of 4.3%, shipping between 7 and 8 million handsets. In 1999 it sold 11.5 million for a 4.1% share and even managed to be the third largest supplier in Europe.

In the second quarter of 2000 Alcatel shipped 5.47 million phones (5.6% share), roughly the same as Panasonic, Siemens and Samsung, and all collectively behind the big three (Nokia, Motorola and Ericsson). However, Alcatel's handset sales then shrunk. In the year 2003, Alcatel sold just 7.6 million phones, only a marginal number out of the 520 million in total global sales.

Former Alcatel One Touch logo

After experiencing falling sales in the market and large losses in its parent company, Alcatel Mobile Phones was established on 24 April 2004 as a joint venture between Alcatel (45%) and TCL Corporation (55%) of China where both would jointly develop mobile phones. However, when unable to profitise off it, Alcatel decided to dissolve the joint venture in 2005 and exited the business entirely to focus on its core network business. TCL acquired Alcatel's 45 percent share, and TCL & Alcatel Mobile Phones became a wholly owned subsidiary group of TCL. The brand name continued to be licensed to TCL by Alcatel and its successor Alcatel-Lucent.

In 2010, Alcatel One Touch became the corporate brand. It became an official sponsor of Tour de France 2011. In February 2016 after the Alcatel One Touch brand came under Nokia ownership (after buying out Alcatel-Lucent), it was changed back to simply Alcatel and a new logo was introduced.

=== Company structure ===
TCL Mobile Limited (former name: T&A Mobile Phones Limited) is a member of TCL Communication listed on Hong Kong Stock Exchange (HKSE: 2618) which was established in August 2004 by TCL Communication and Alcatel. TCL Mobile Limited manages three business units: Alcatel, TCL Mobile Phones and Brand Design Lab. TCL Communication was also the developer of BlackBerry devices from 2016 to 2020 when its contract with BlackBerry expired.

== Product history ==
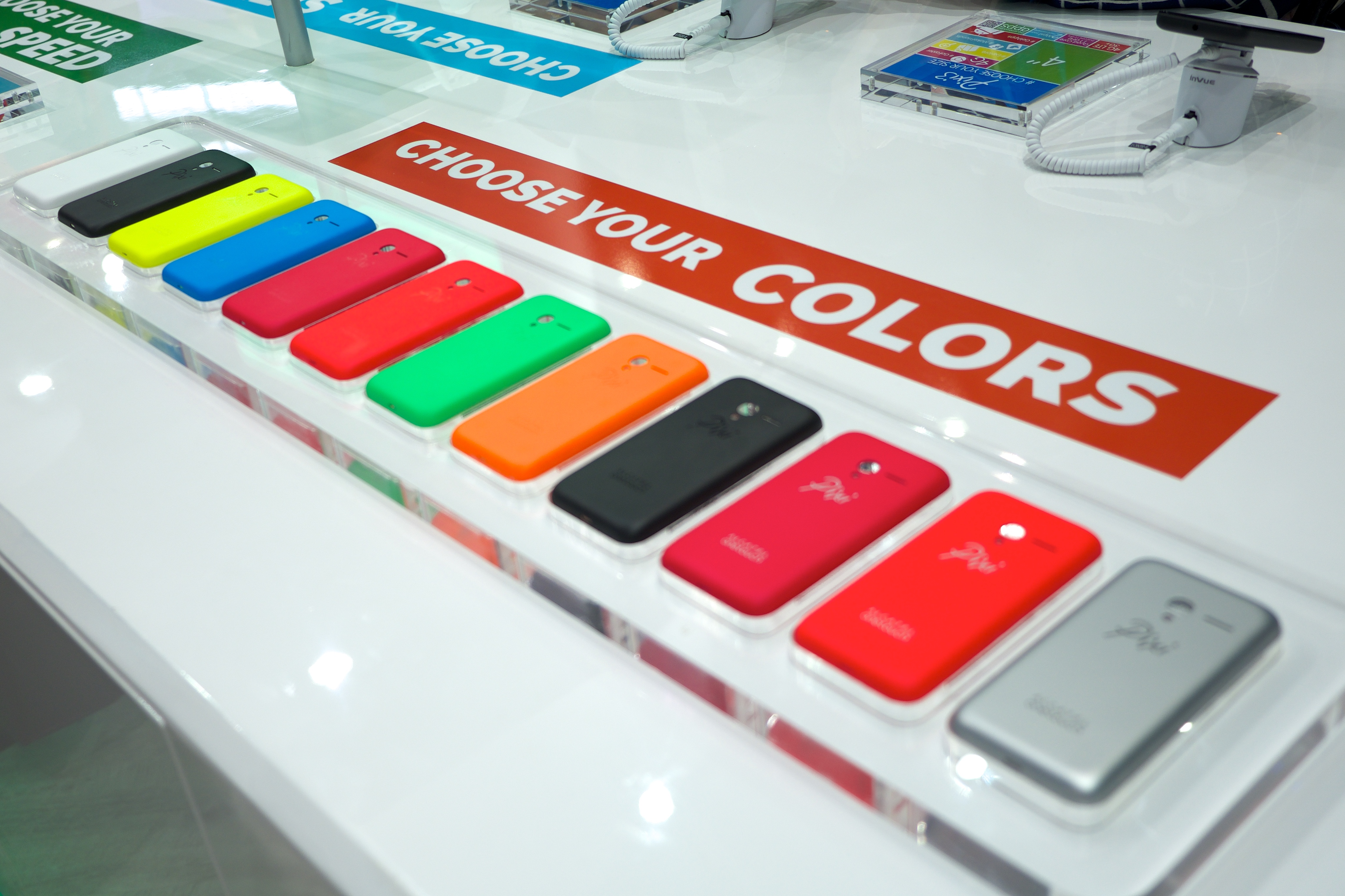
Alcatel One Touch Pixi on display at MWC 2015

Alcatel made its first digital GSM phone, 9109 HA, in 1991. It was the first GSM handset marketed in France. In 1996 the Alcatel HC800 launched. It was succeeded by Alcatel HC1000 which added data and fax transmission capability.

Alcatel introduced its One Touch range of GSM mobile phones at CeBIT 1997. The first products of the One Touch (OT) range included the One Touch Easy, a consumer handset sold in various colours and notable for using AAA standard alkaline batteries. It was released in June 1997, marketed in some European territories, South Africa, Singapore, Malaysia, Indonesia and Australia. Alcatel reported two million sales by September 1997. The second of the three products was the business-oriented Alcatel One Touch Pro, released in March 1997 and succeeding Alcatel HC1000. Lastly, a concept Alcatel One Touch COM was developed in collaboration with Sharp Corporation (who sold the very similar Sharp MC-G1) and was described as the first pocket sized smartphone combining a GSM phone, personal organiser and Internet and email terminal. It had a monochrome touchscreen display operated using a stylus. It was released in 1998.

In 1998 several new models were introduced in the Alcatel One Touch range. The One Touch Pocket was a professional phone with large display and software modem. At the lower end, One Touch Club is similar to the Easy but with a sliding keypad mechanism, while the Max was a model derived from the Easy. Alcatel One Touch View combined the sliding mechanism of the club with the more advanced features offered by the Pocket. Variants of some of these with the 'db' suffix were also released noting that these were dual band (the originals only make use of GSM 900 band).

The next generation of Alcatel One Touch phones came in 2000 with a significant redesign including a joystick controller and less colour pop. OT 300 was the cheaper handset for affordability, while OT 500 was the mid-ranger with more style and the OT 700, which was also Alcatel's first with a flip down keypad, was the executive one. In 2001 new updates were released, OT 311 and OT 511, followed by OT 312 and OT 512 in 2002. In March 2002, a new top model was introduced, the Alcatel OT 715.

The first Alcatel phone with a colour display was released in 2002, the OT 535. It was also the basis for a higher end model, OT 735, which included a built-in camera.

In October 2005, Alcatel teamed up with French magazine Elle to launch the GlamPhone, targeted at women. In May 2007, the GlamPhone ELLE No3 was announced. In October 2007, an Alcatel flip phone created together with fashion house Mandarina Duck was introduced.

The first 3G Alcatel phone was the OT-S920 introduced in late 2007. Alcatel One Touch SPORT/PRO (OT-I650) was launched in September 2008. Alcatel OT-V770 in the entry level was announced in February 2009 designed to be stylish and include multimedia features. Amid the touchscreen trend in 2009, TCL launched the Alcatel One Touch MINI (OT-708) on 27 July 2009. It has a 2.4 inch, 320x240 pixel touch display and sold for under €79. A Vodafone rebranded version was also sold as the Vodafone 541. It also launched the first Alcatel with a full QWERTY keyboard, One Touch TRIBE and One Touch CHROME (OT-800), in 2009. Both the Mini and Tribe were TCL's best selling handsets that were introduced in the year 2009.

The Alcatel One Touch XTRA (OT-800) was their first touch and side-slider. At the 2010 Mobile World Congress, Alcatel introduced several phones, including: the One Touch 808 in wide clamshell and QWERTY keyboard style. Alcatel's first smartphone was the OT-980, launched in 2010, running Android Eclair. In 2013, one of the first Firefox OS devices was made released as Alcatel One Touch Fire.

In 2014 the Alcatel One Touch Pop 7 was released and then in 2015 the One Touch Pop Fit which could be strapped to a wrist. 2016 saw several releases: Alcatel Idol 4s, Pop 4, Pop 4+, Pop 4s, and Pop 7 LTE. During the Mobile World Congress (MWC) in Barcelona in 2017, TCL launched Alcatel A5 LED, purportedly the first Android smartphone with an "interactive LED-covered phone". On 10 November, the company launched the Alcatel A5 LED and Alcatel A7 in India.

TCL introduced the Alcatel 3, Alcatel 3L and Alcatel 1S smartphones, as well as the Alcatel 3T 10 at Mobile World Congress 2019. The company introduced two entry-level Android Go 11 models, 1L Pro and Alcatel 1 (2021) released at the end of 2021. After this, TCL pushed its own brand in mobile phones. Consequently, Alcatel remained dormant for four years, and resumed production in 2025 with three Alcatel V3 smartphones for the Indian market.

== Gallery ==
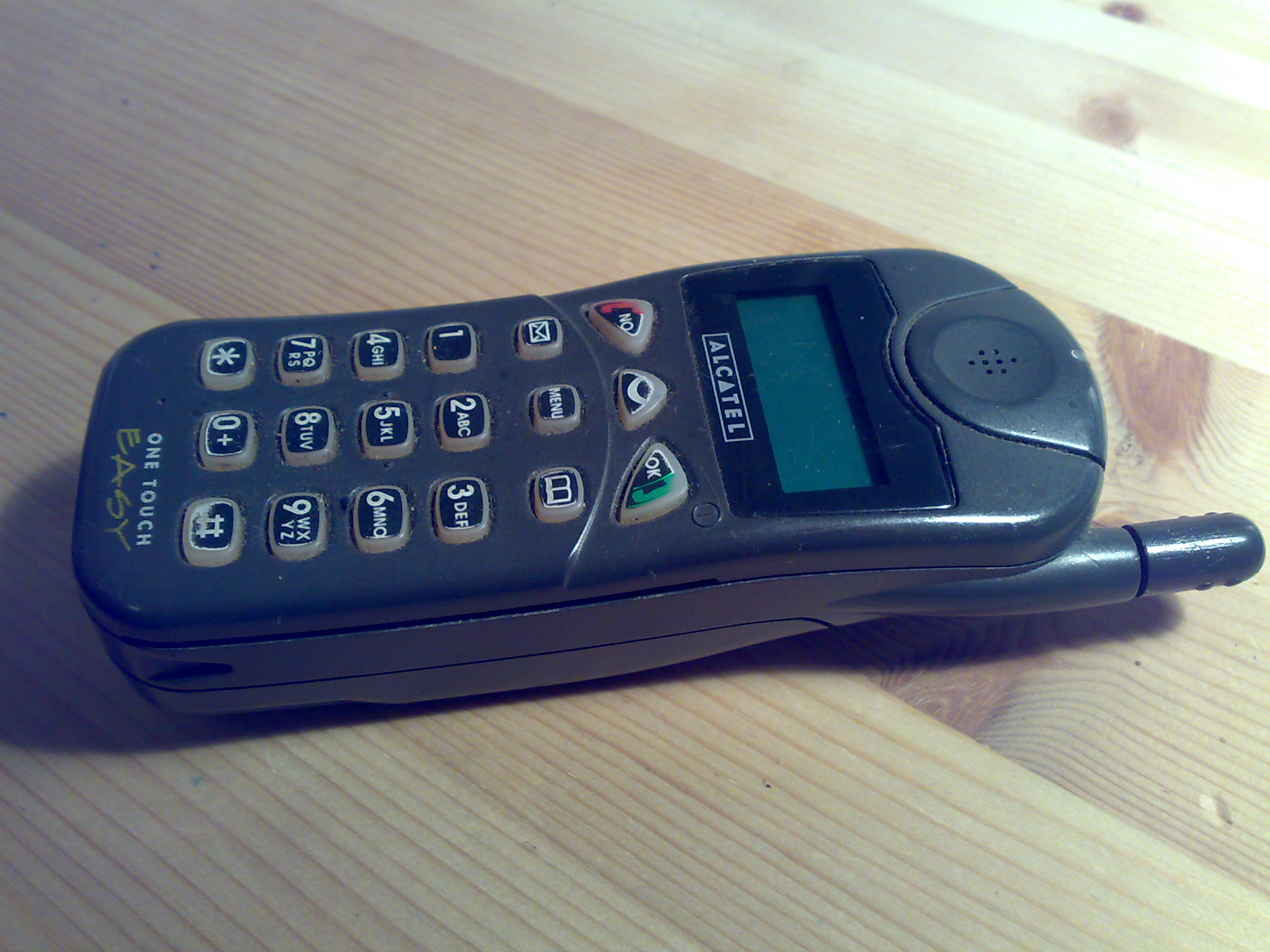
Alcatel One Touch Easy HD1 (1997)

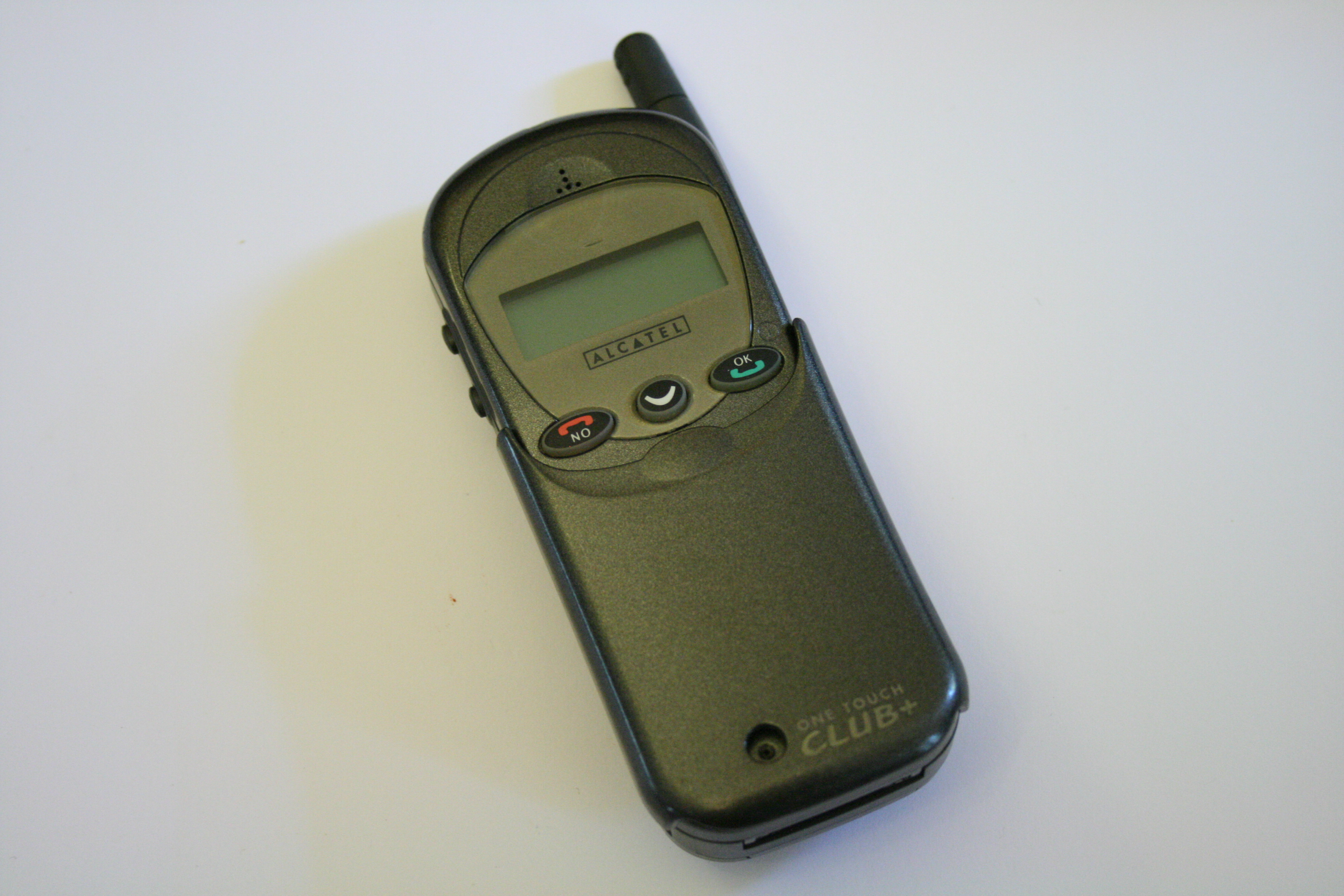
Alcatel One Touch Club + (1998)

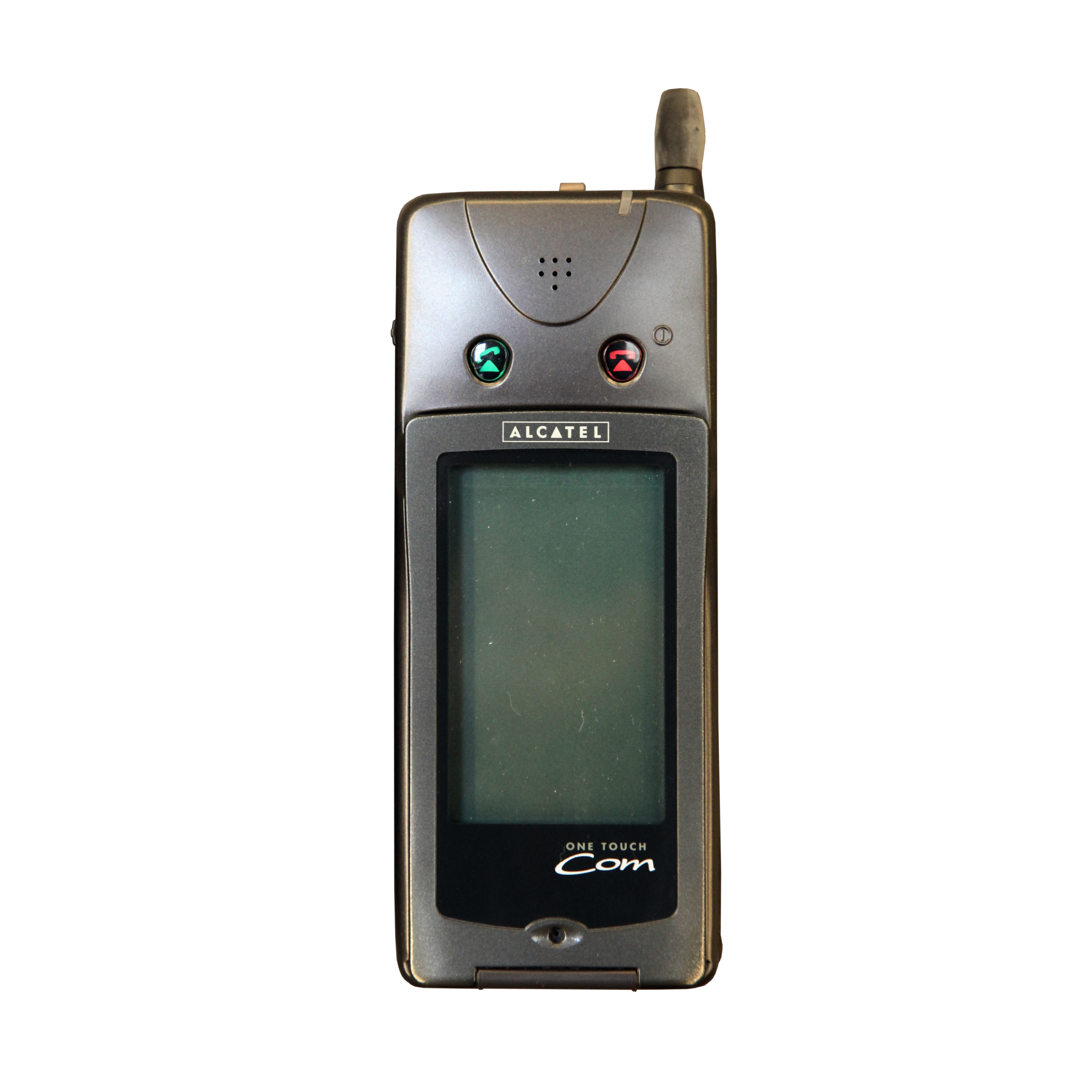
Alcatel One Touch Com (1998)

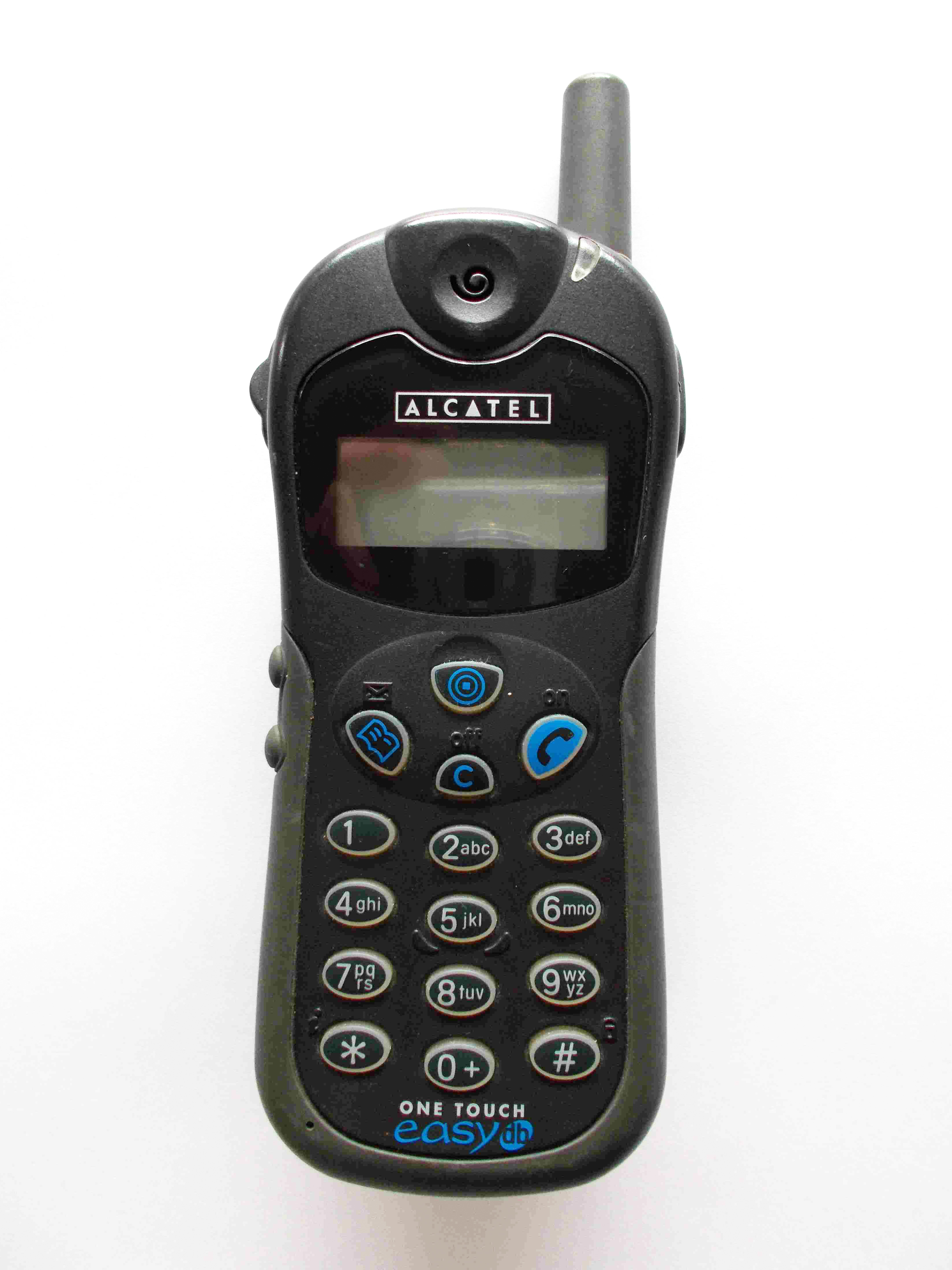
Alcatel One Touch Easy DB (1999)

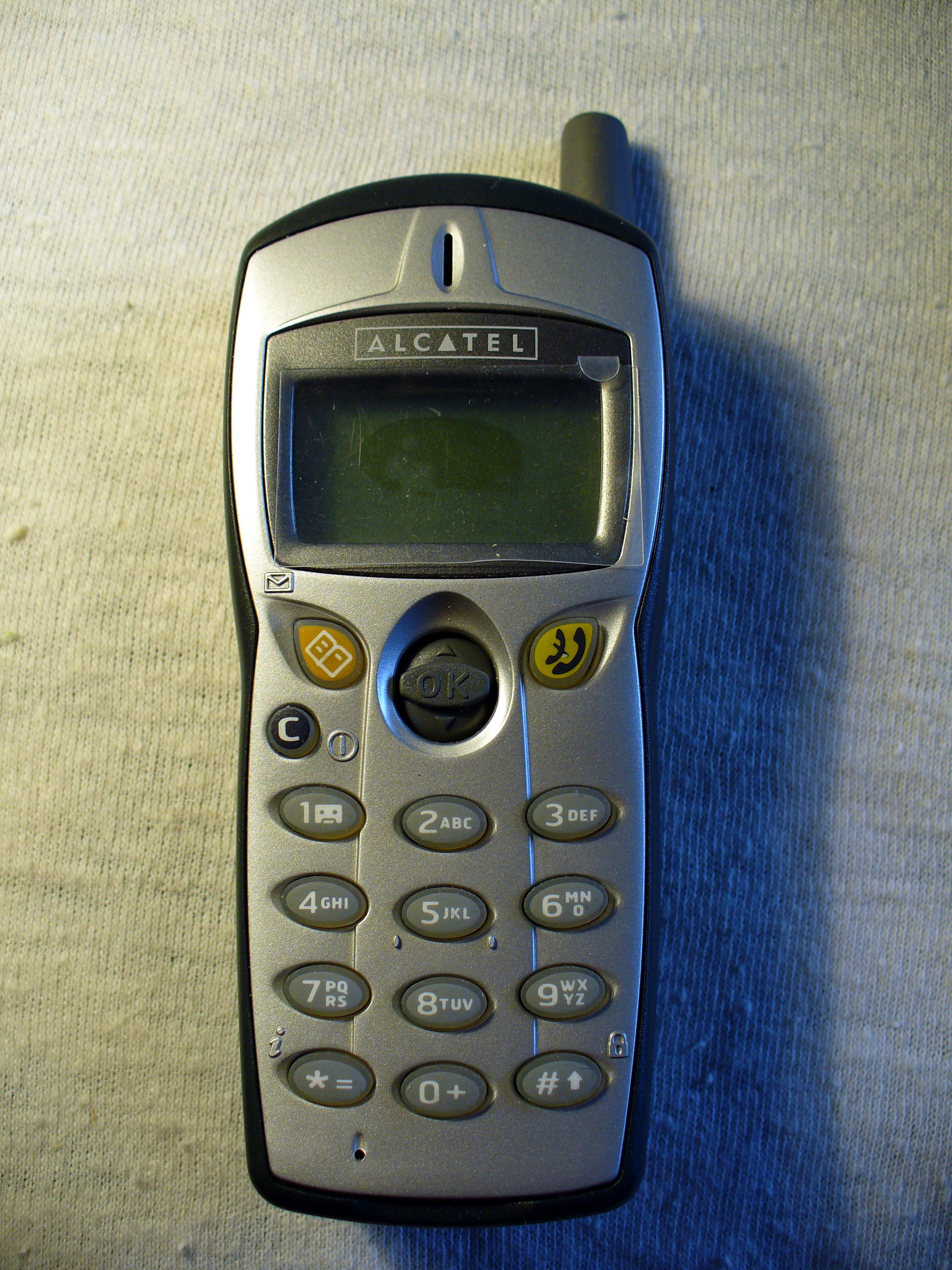
Alcatel OT 302 (2000)

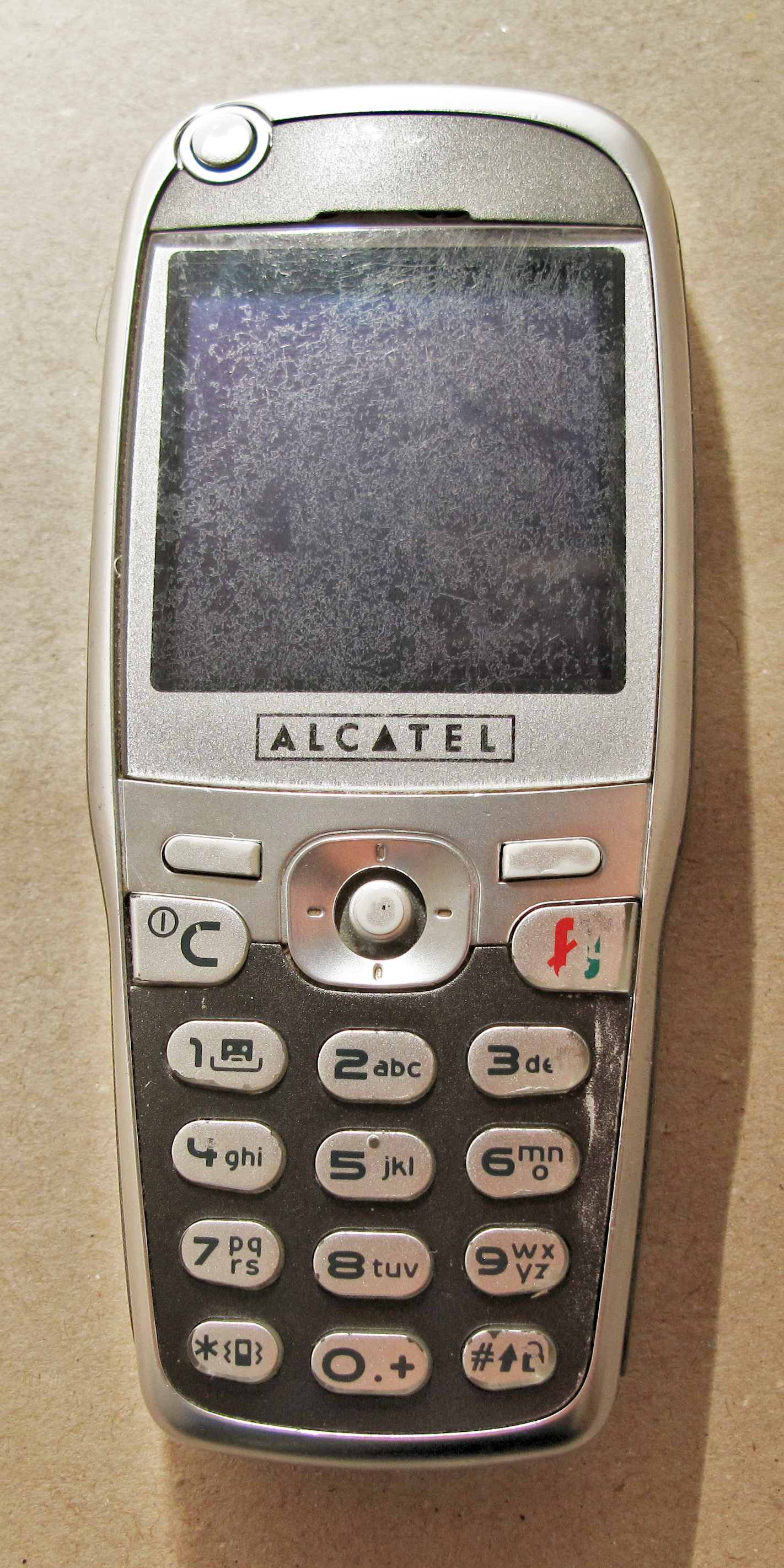
Alcatel One Touch 535 (2003)

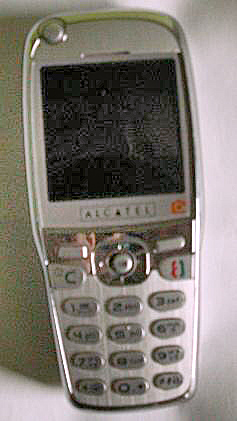
Alcatel OT 735 (2003)

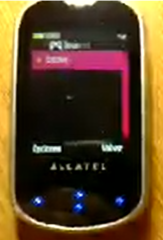
Alcatel One Touch Mini (2009)

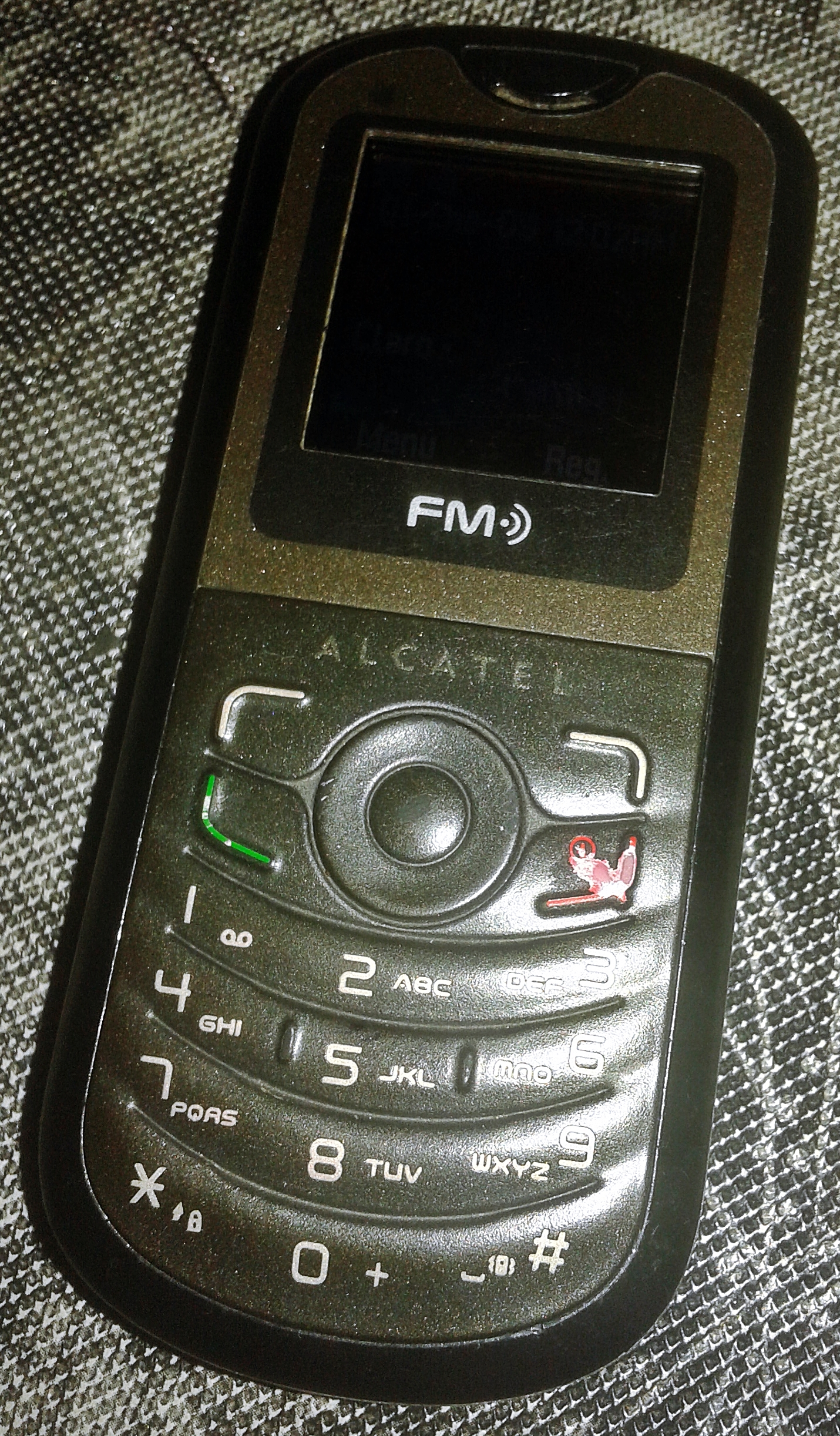
Alcatel One Touch 203 (2009)

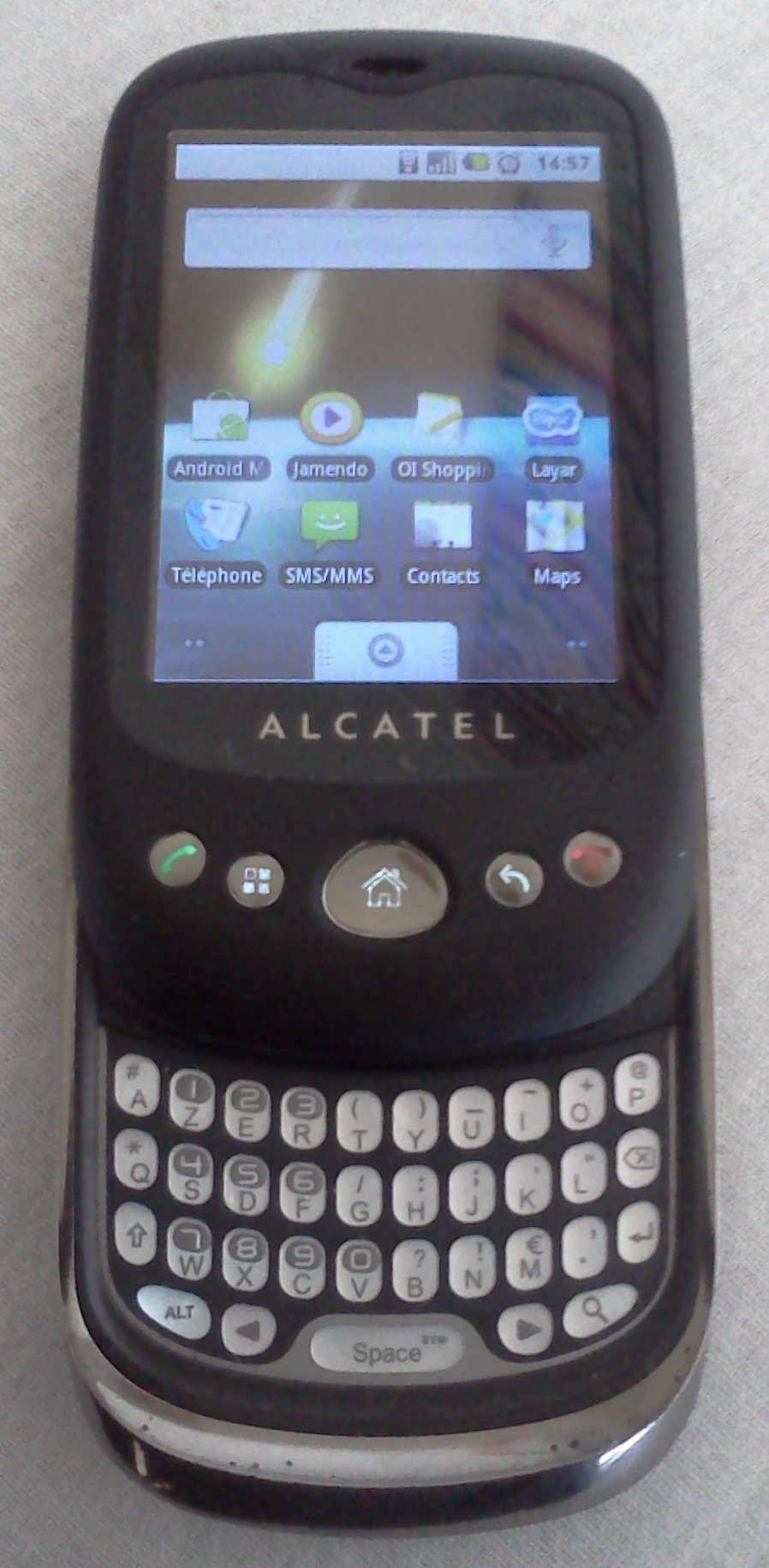
Alcatel One Touch 980 (2010)

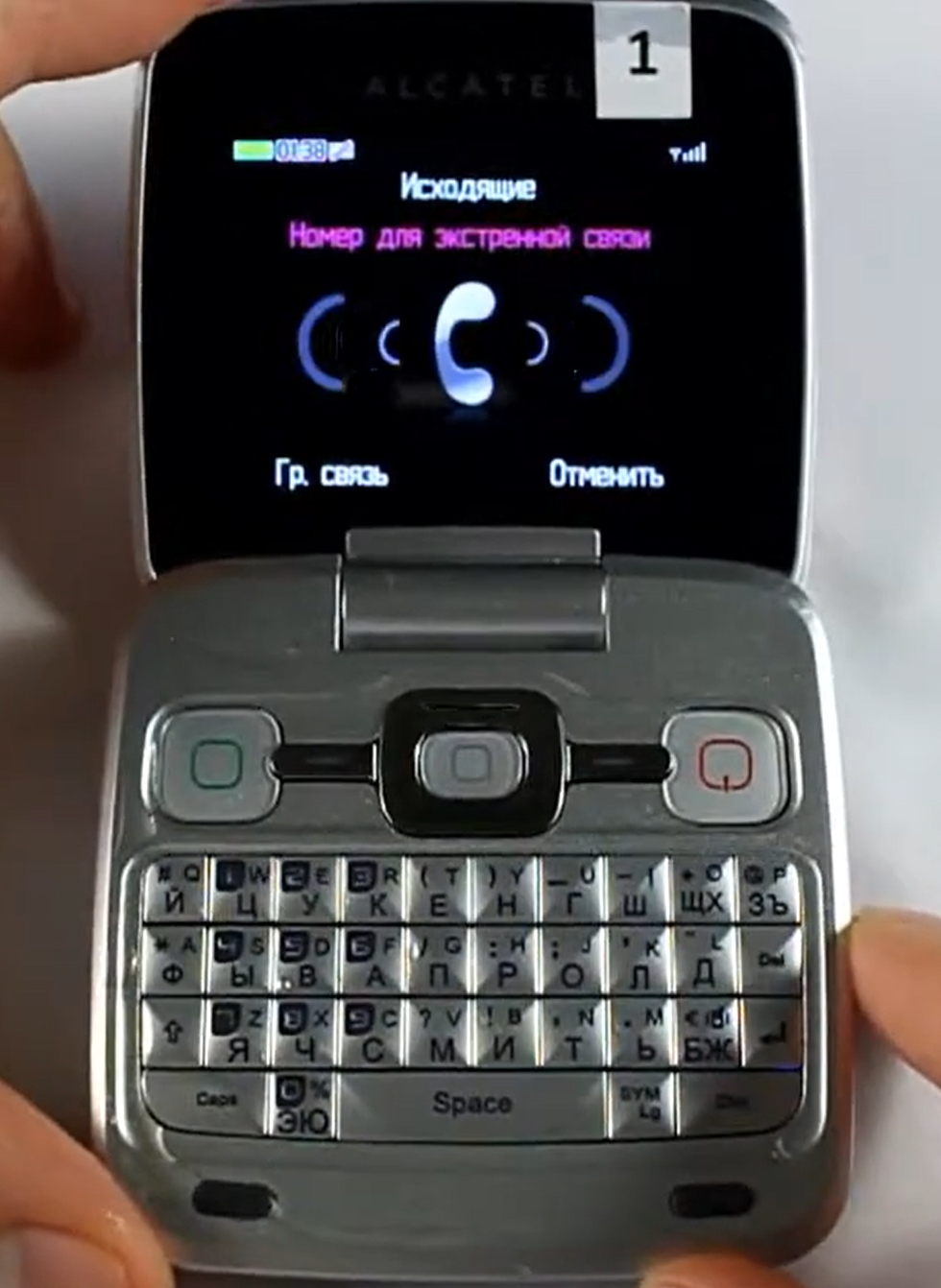
Alcatel One Touch 808 (2010)

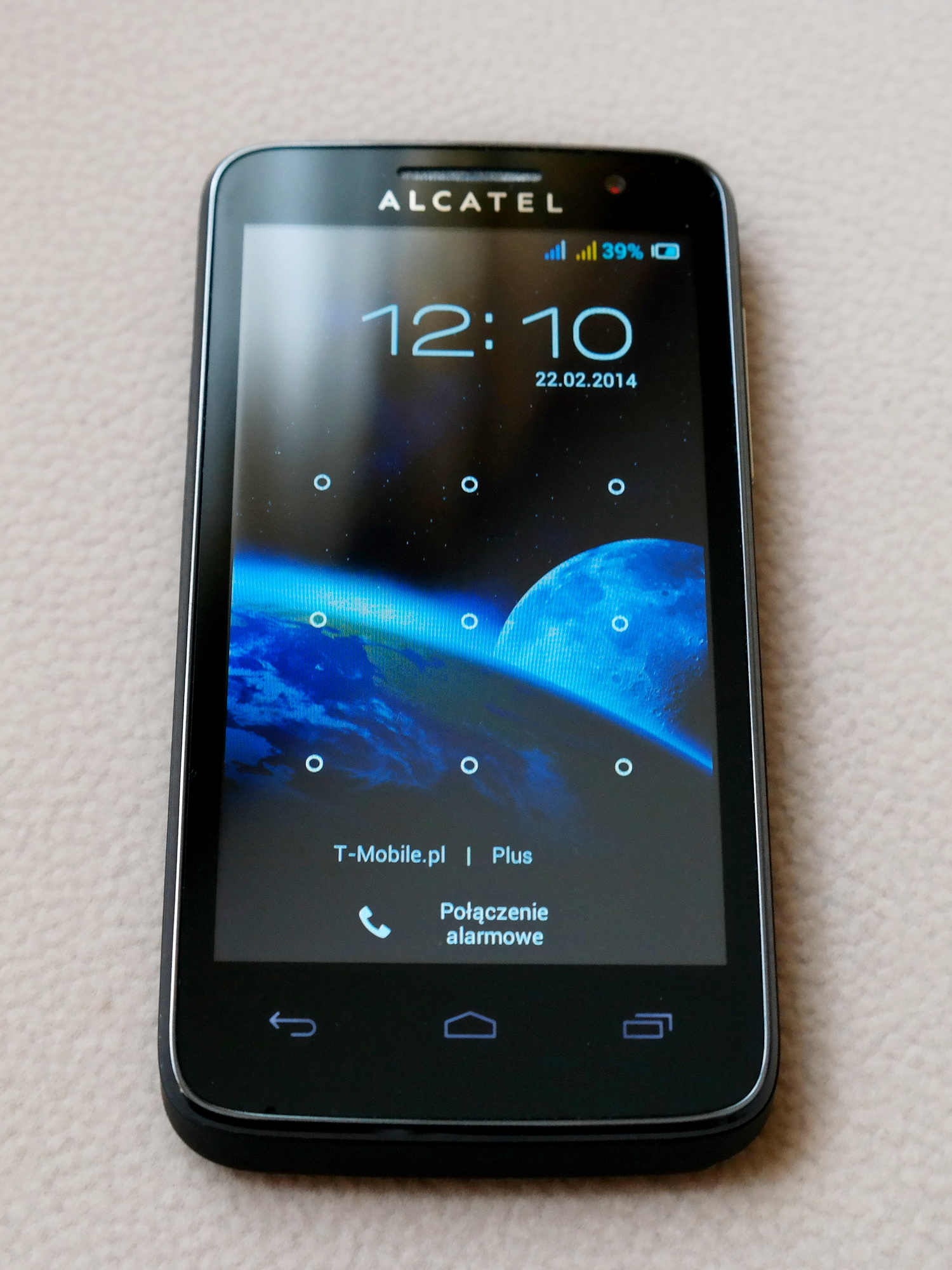
Alcatel One Touch M'Pop (2013)

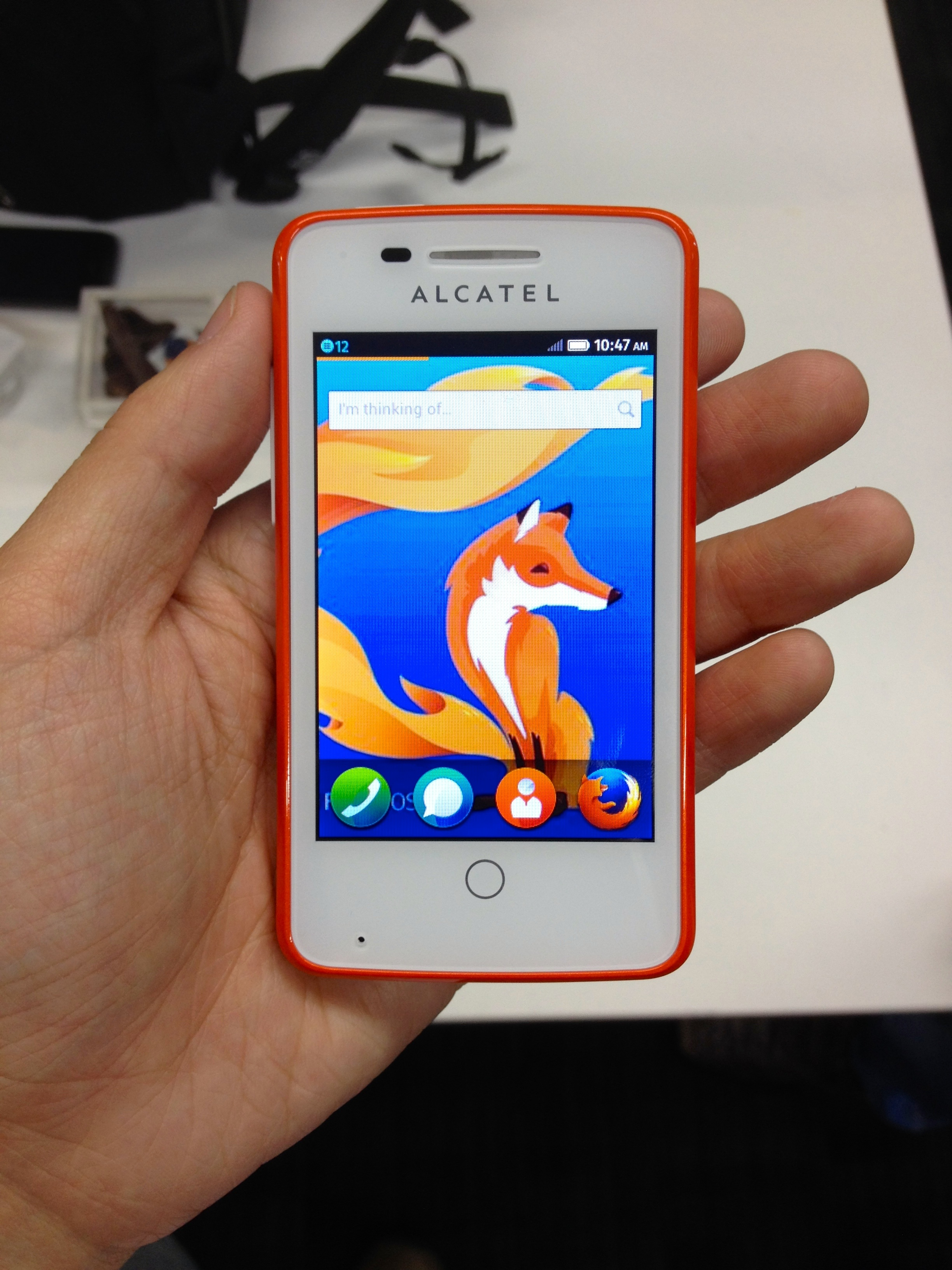
Alcatel One Touch Fire (2013)

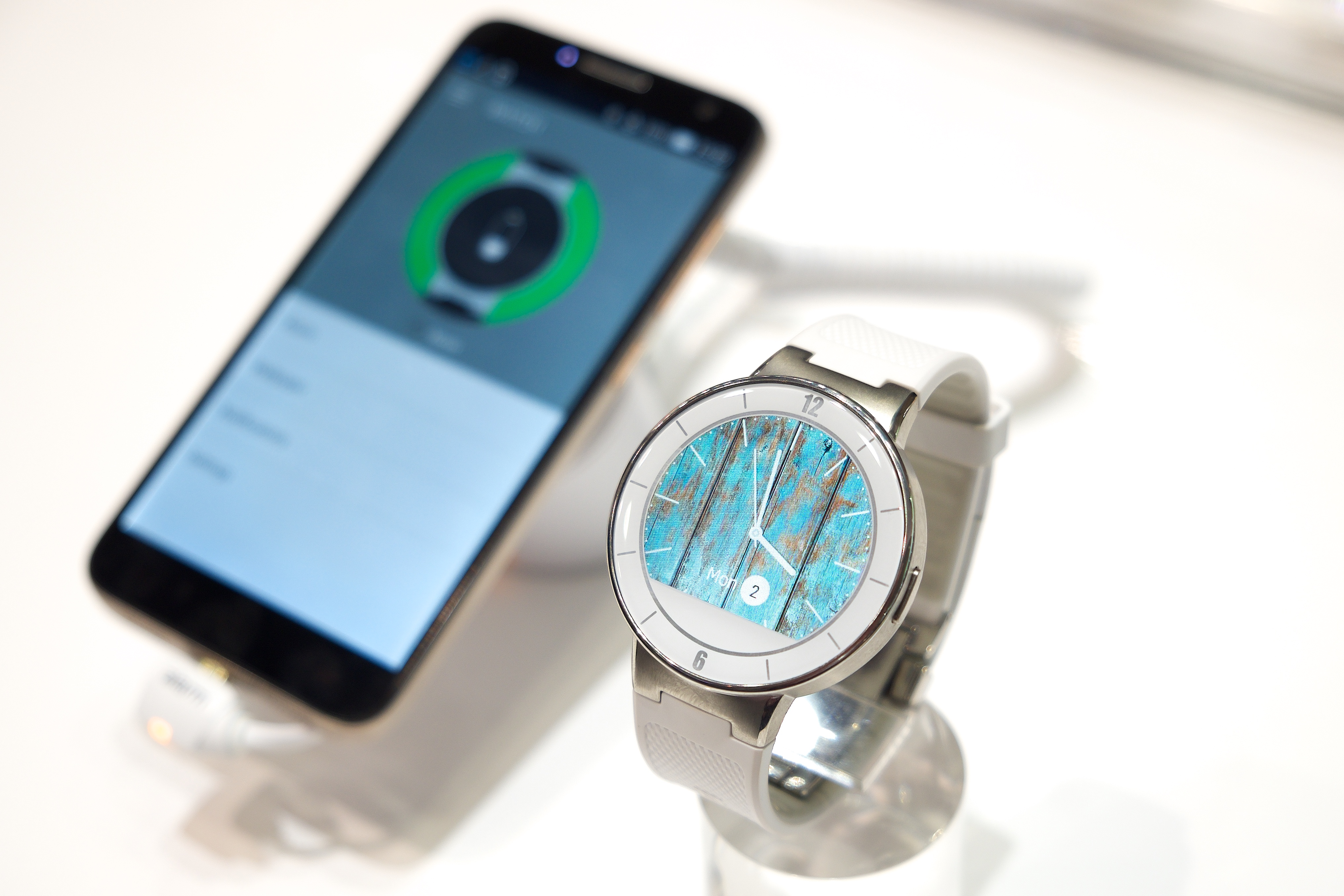
Alcatel Watch (2015)

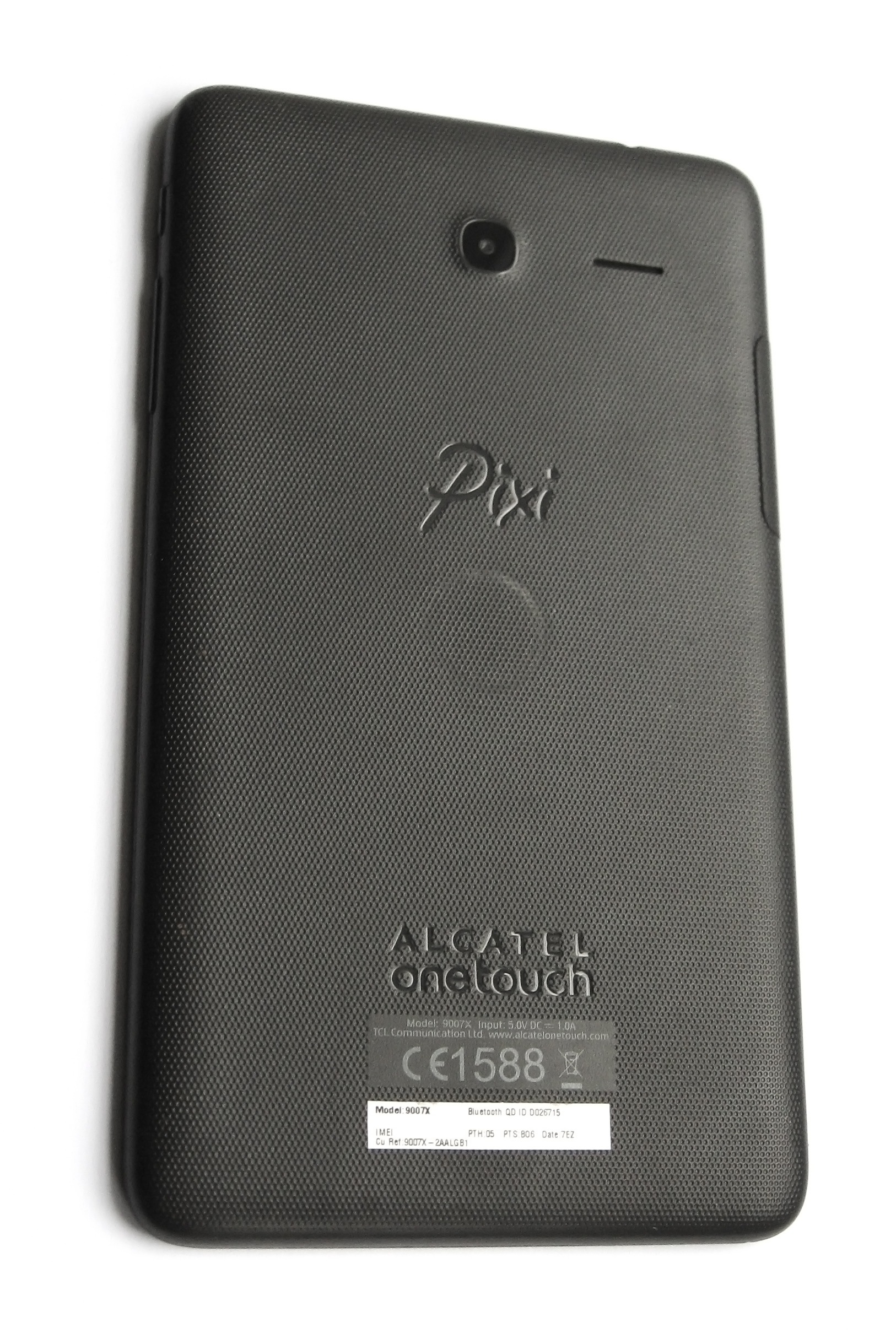
Alcatel One Touch Pixi 3 (7) tablet (back; ca 2015)

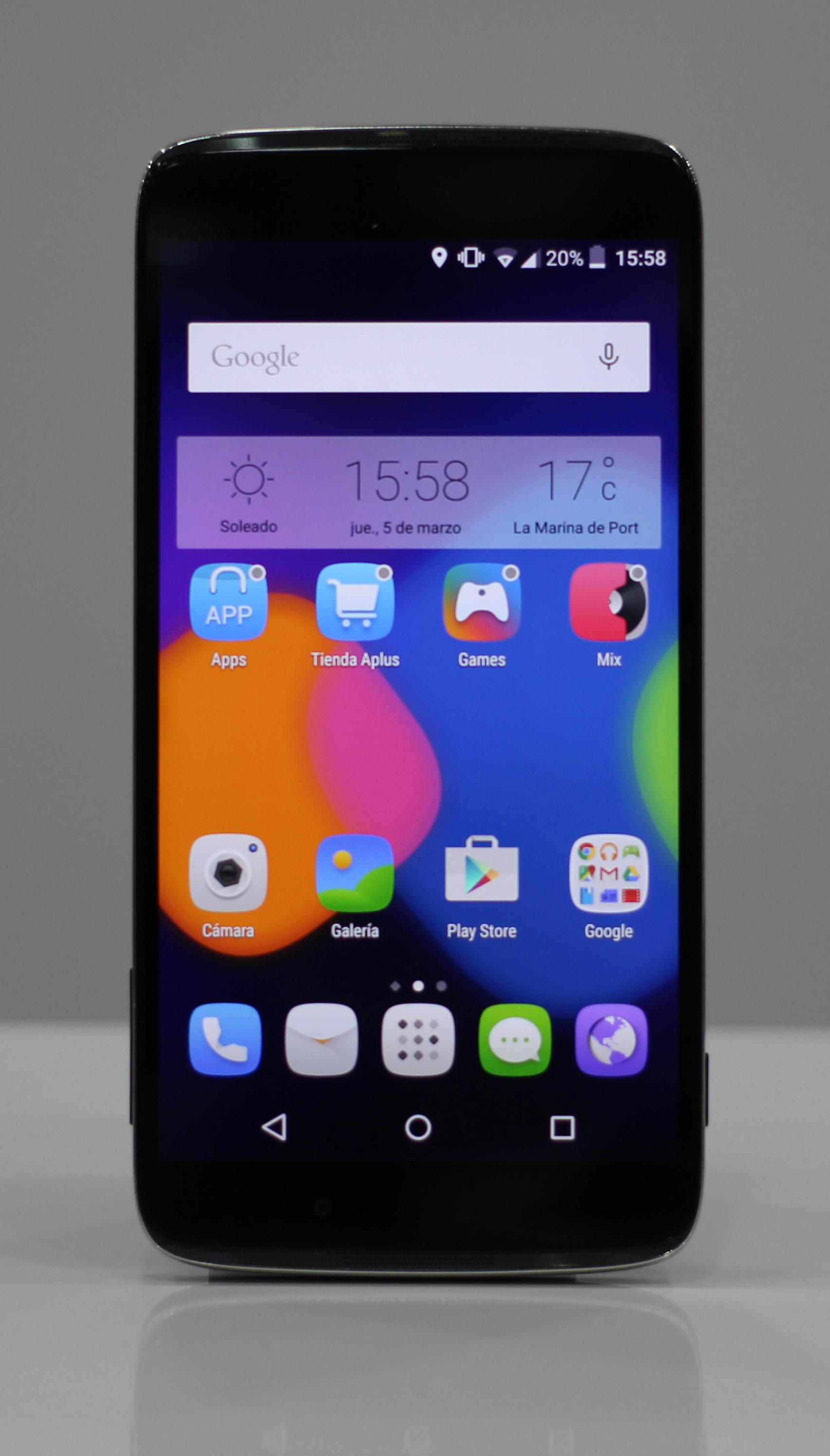
Alcatel One Touch Idol 3 (2015)

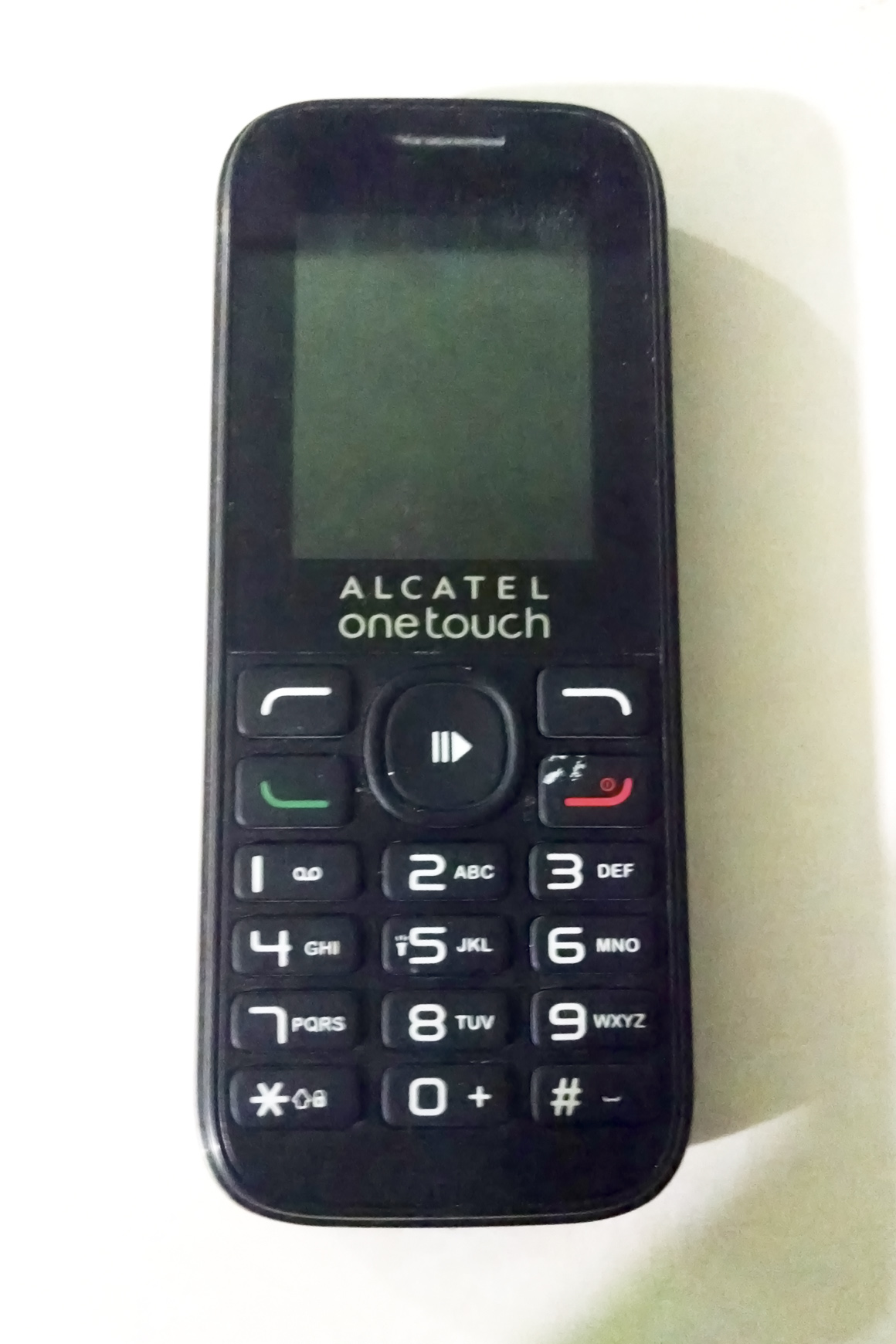
Alcatel OneTouch 1050 (2015)

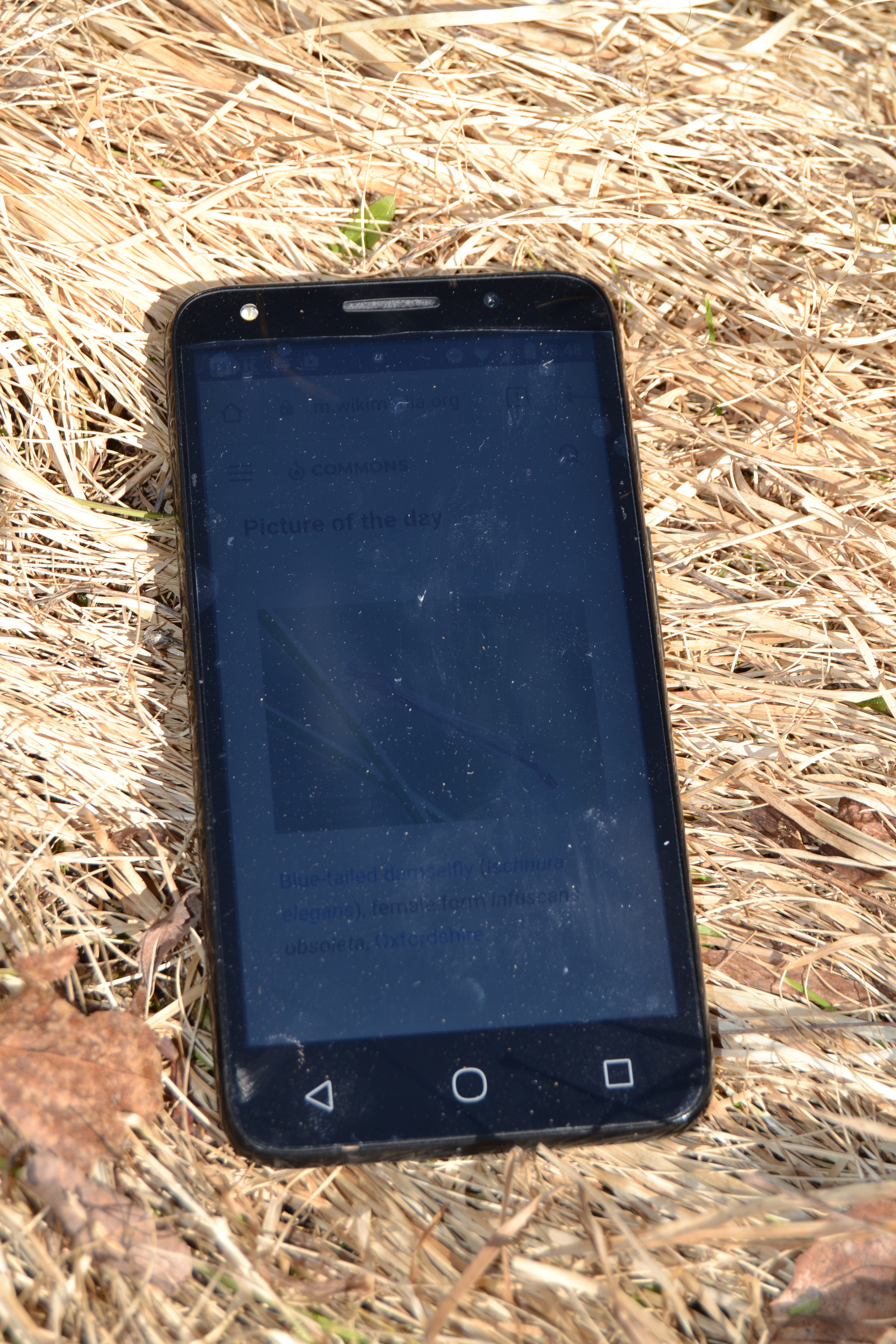
Alcatel One Touch Pixi 4 (2016)

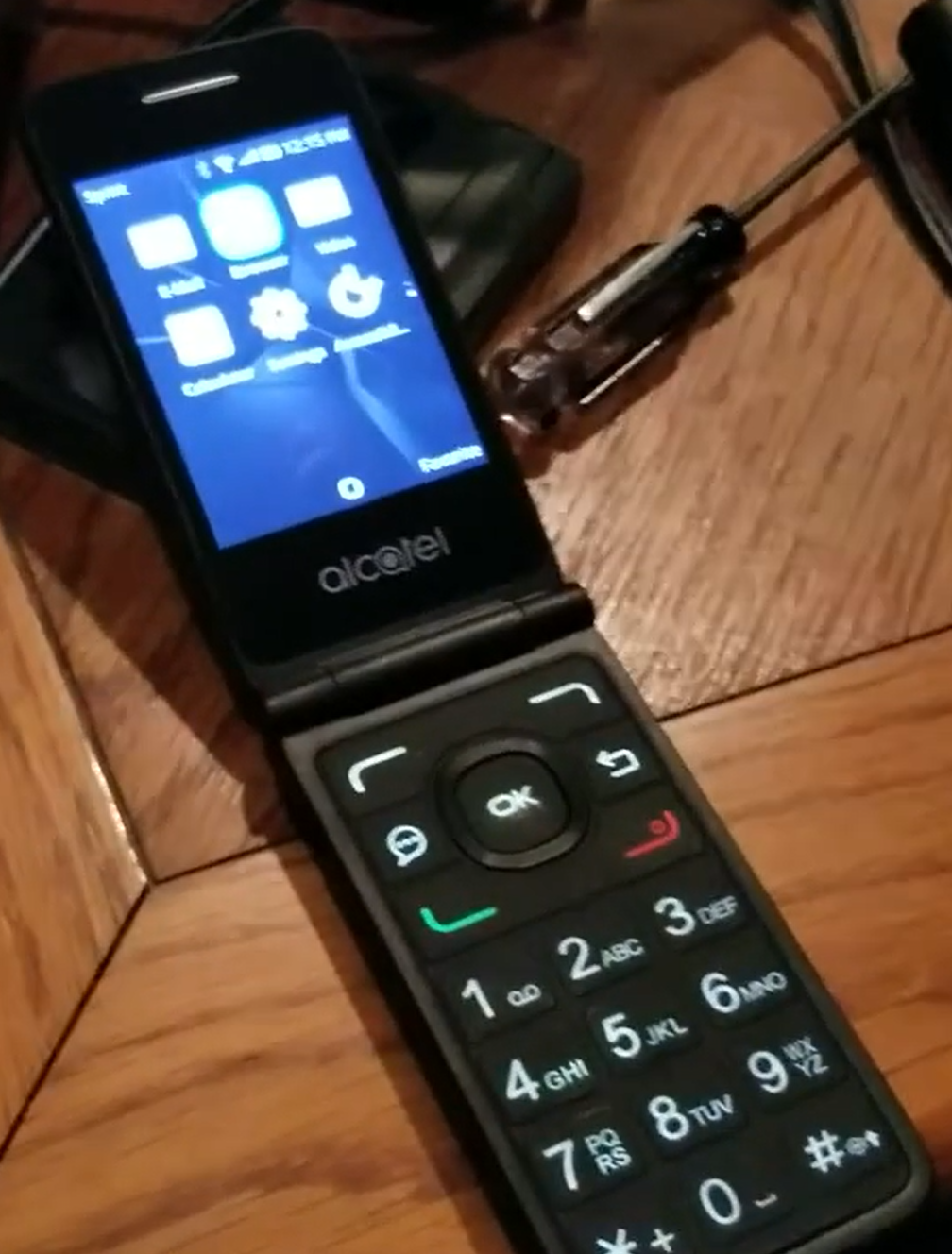
Alcatel Go Flip running KaiOS (2018)

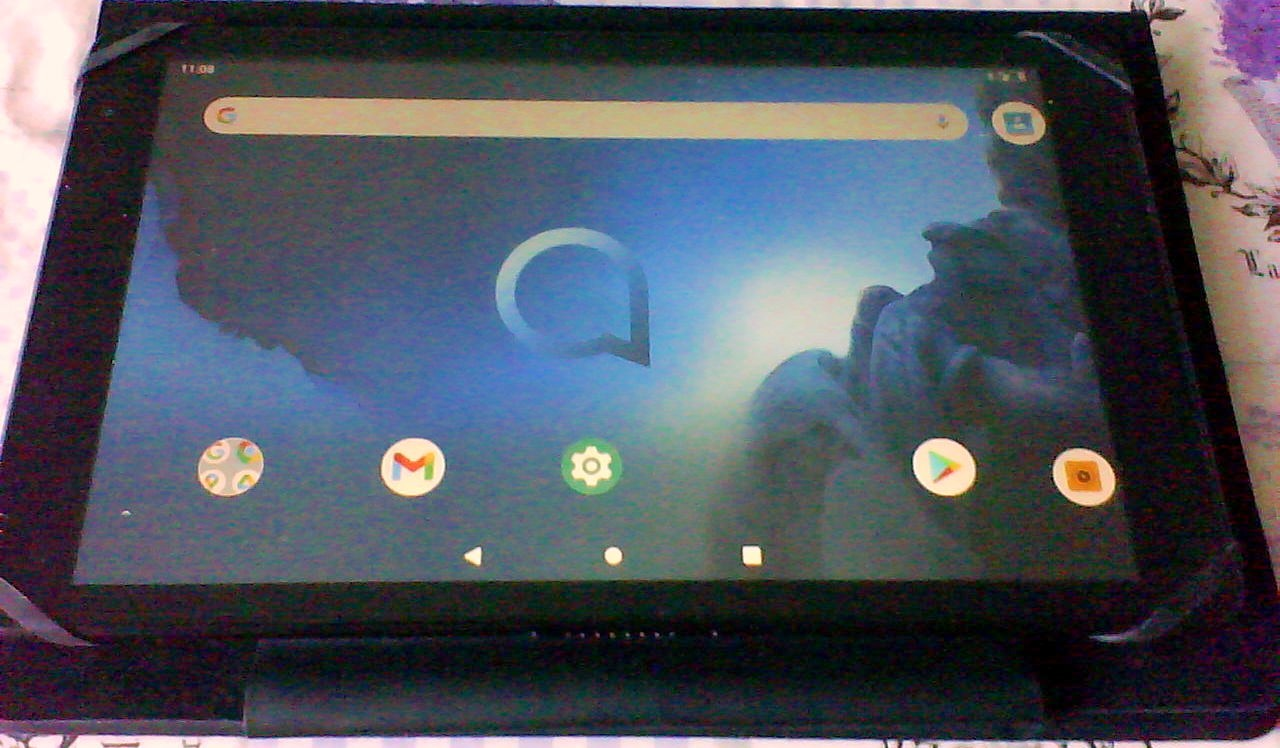
Tablet 3T 10" (2019)

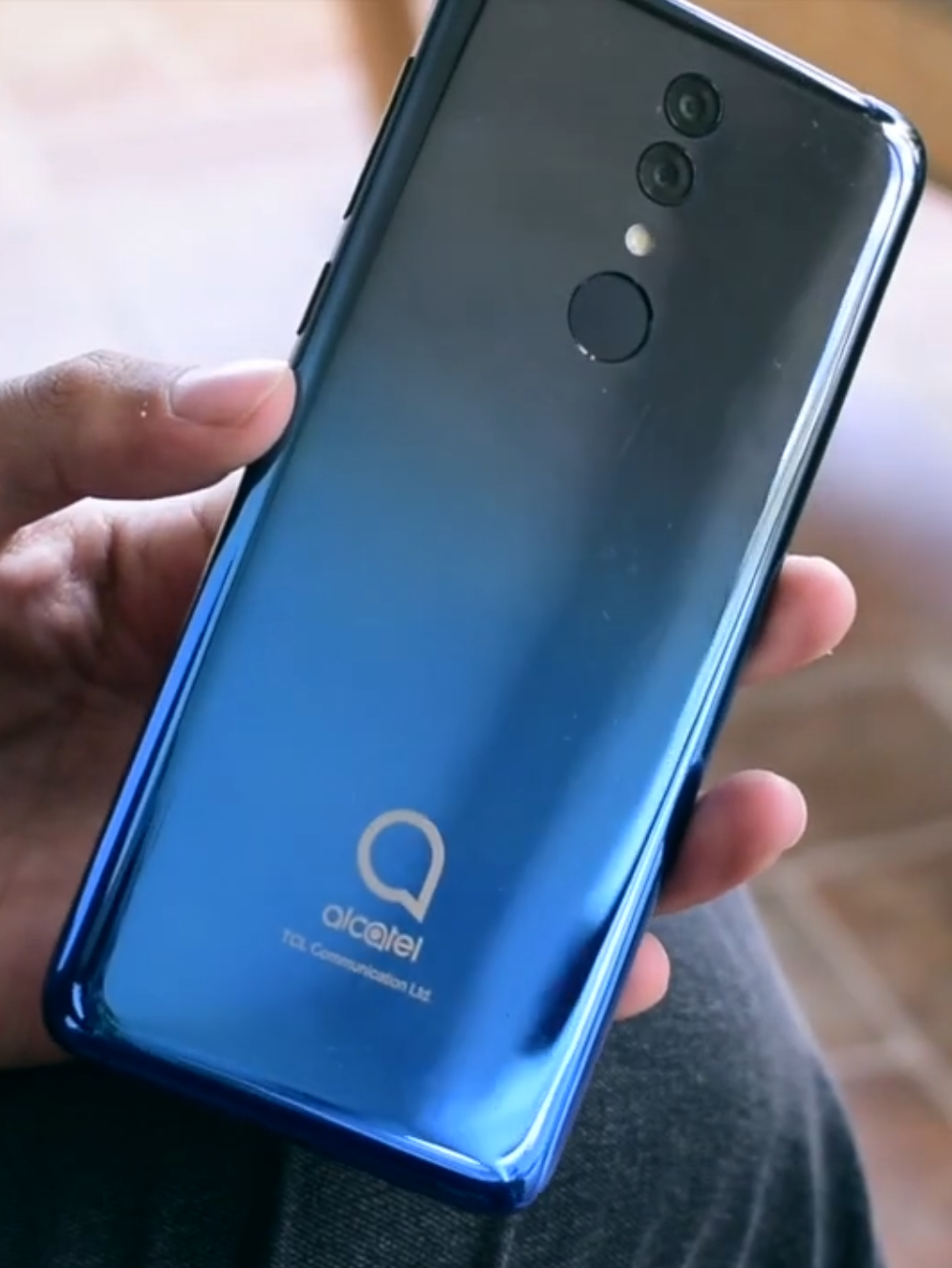
Alcatel 3 (2019)

== Awards ==
In 2012, Alcatel won an International Forum Design iF design award for its One Touch 818 and the Onetouch 355 Play models.
