= Au Xperia Z3 SOL26 =

Japan-exclusive smartphone

Xperia Z3 SOL26
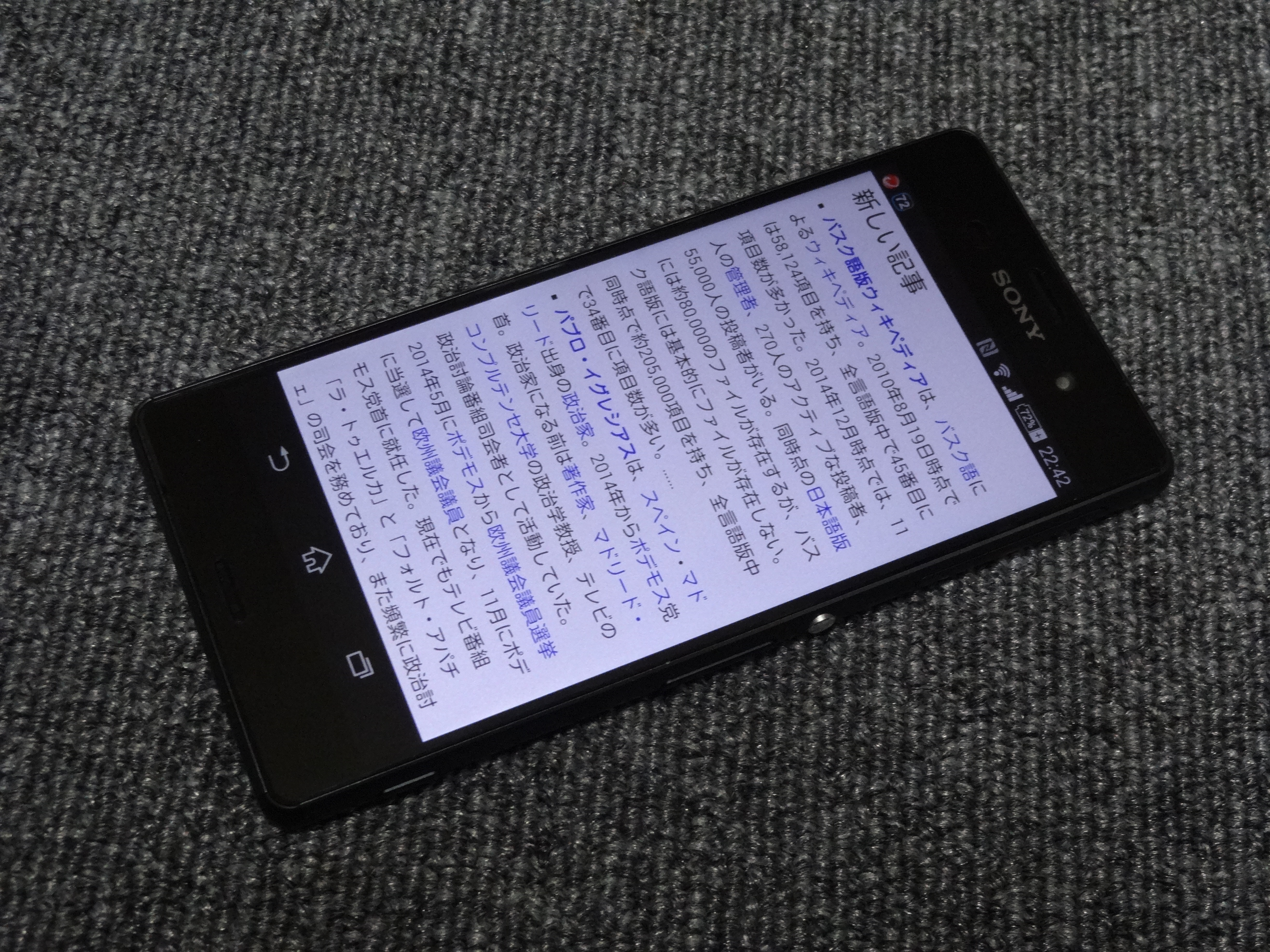
- Front
- Brand: au
- Manufacturer: Sony Mobile Communications Japan
- First released: October 23, 2014
- Availability by region: Japan only
- Compatible networks: 3G: CDMA2000 1xMC (au 3G) (New 800 MHz/2 GHz), W-CDMA (850 MHz/2 GHz); 2G: GSM (1.9 GHz/1.8 GHz/900 MHz); 3.9G/4G: FDD-LTE / LTE-A (au 4G LTE / au 4G LTE CA) (New 800 MHz/2 GHz), WiMAX 2.1 (WiMAX 2+); 3.5G: CDMA2000 1xEV-DO MC-Rev.A (WIN HIGH SPEED), CDMA2000 1xEV-DO Rev.A (au 3G), CDMA2000 1xEV-DO Rel.0 (au 3G), UMTS (W-CDMA); 3G: CDMA2000 1xMC (au 3G); Other: Wireless LAN (IEEE 802.11a/b/g/n/ac 5 GHz/2.4 GHz)
- Form factor: Slate
- Colors: White; Black; Copper; Silver Green
- Dimensions: 146×72×7.3 mm (5.75×2.83×0.29 in)
- Weight: Approx. 152 g
- Operating system: Android 4.4.4, upgradable to Android 5.0.2
- CPU: 2.5 GHz quad-core Qualcomm Snapdragon 801 (MSM8974AC)
- Memory: 32 GB storage, 3 GB RAM
- Removable storage: microSD (up to 2 GB), microSDHC (up to 32 GB), microSDXC (up to 128 GB) (officially supported by KDDI)
- Battery: Capacity: 3,100 mAh (non-removable); Talk time: Approx. 1,370 minutes; Stand by time: Approx. 770 hours (3G) Approx. 670 hours (LTE/WiMAX 2+)
- Charging: Time: Approx. 150 minutes
- Rear camera: Approx. 20.7 megapixels, backside-illuminated stacked CMOS image sensor (Exmor RS for mobile), face detection autofocus, 4K UHD video recording, image stabilization, Timeshift video, AR effect
- Front camera: Approx. 2.2 megapixels, CMOS image sensor (Exmor R for mobile)
- Display: 'Touch pad: FeliCa / NFC; Display: 5.2-inch IPS Triluminos Display for mobile, FHD (1920 × 1080 pixels), approx. 16.77 million colors
- Connectivity: microUSB, MHL 3.0, Headset jack
- Data inputs: POBox Plus
- Other: Tethering, Bluetooth 4.0
- References: 1. LTE supports carrier aggregation 2. Standard support for High-Resolution Audio playback at up to 192 kHz / 24-bit

The Xperia Z3 SOL26 is an Android-based smartphone manufactured and developed by Sony Mobile Communications Japan for the Japanese domestic market. It was released for KDDI and Okinawa Cellular Telephone Company under the au brand, featuring support for 3.5G (au 3G), 3.9G (au 4G LTE), and 4G (au 4G LTE CA / WiMAX 2+) mobile communication systems.

The smartphone serves as the successor to the SOL23. Counting the au-targeted Xperia Z Ultra and Xperia ZL2, it marks the fourth generation in the Sony Xperia Z series available on the carrier.

== Specifications ==
=== Audio capabilities ===
The device features advanced audio playback capabilities, including native support for high-resolution audio formats. It incorporates proprietary "DSEE HX" upscaling technology, which restores high-frequency signals and fine audio details lost during the compression of standard audio files (such as MP3s), elevating them to near high-resolution quality. Additionally, the device is equipped with a digital noise-canceling system capable of reducing ambient background noise by up to approximately 98.0%.

=== Connectivity and network support ===
In terms of cellular connectivity, the device supports 4G LTE networks with maximum download speeds of up to 150 Mbps. It also utilizes carrier aggregation (CA) technology and is compatible with WiMAX 2+ networks. For wireless local area networking and short-range communication, it features dual-band Wi-Fi compliant with the IEEE 802.11a/b/g/n/ac standards alongside Bluetooth 4.0.

=== Hardware, performance, and functions ===
The internal hardware is powered by a 2.5 GHz quad-core processor, paired with 3 GB of RAM and 32 GB of internal storage. Storage capacity can be expanded via a microSDXC card slot, which supports cards up to 128 GB.

The device includes an array of regional and standard smartphone features, such as:

- Mobile Television - Support for both 1Seg and FullSeg terrestrial digital TV broadcasting.
- Contactless Services - Integration of Osaifu-Keitai (mobile wallet) functionality and Near Field Communication (NFC).
- Utility & Durability - Support for Wi-Fi tethering, alongside certified water and dust resistance.

Power is supplied by a 3,100 mAh battery. According to official specifications, this battery provides an estimated talk time of up to 1,370 minutes and a standby time of approximately 670 hours when connected to an LTE network.

=== Software and physical dimensions ===
The device launched with the Android 4.4 operating system pre-installed.

Physically, the handset measures 146 mm in height, 72 mm in width, and has a thickness of 7.3 mm (146 × 72 × 7.3 mm). It weighs approximately 152 grams. At release, the device was made available in four color options: White, Black, Copper, and Silver Green.

== See also ==
- au by KDDI
- Sony Xperia Z3
