= Sony Xperia SL =

Android smartphone

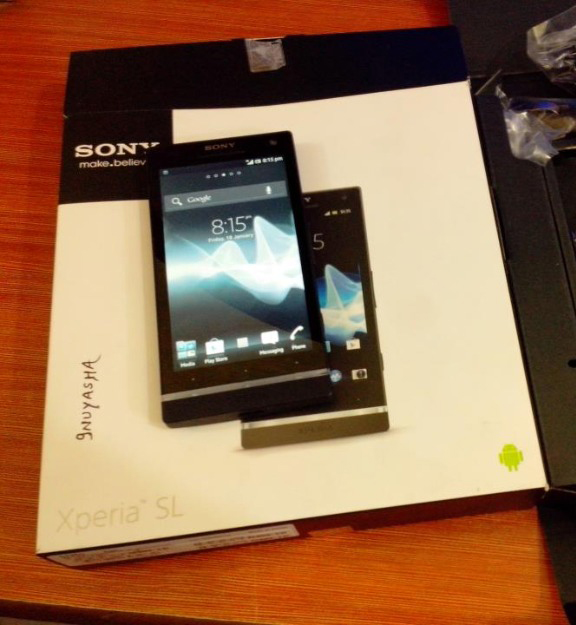
- Brand: Sony
- Type: Smartphone
- Series: Xperia
- First released: September 12, 2012
- Predecessor: Sony Xperia S
- Successor: Sony Xperia acro S
- Related: Sony Xperia P Sony Xperia ion
- Compatible networks: GSM: 850/900/1800/1900 MHz; HSDPA: 850/900/1900/2100 MHz
- Form factor: Slate
- Colors: Black, White, Silver, Pink
- Dimensions: 128 mm (5.04 in) H 64 mm (2.52 in) W 10.6 mm (0.42 in) D
- Weight: 144 g (5.08 oz) with battery
- Operating system: Android Ice Cream Sandwich (4.0.4), upgradable to 4.1.2 Jelly Bean
- CPU: 1.7 GHz dual-core Qualcomm Snapdragon S3 MSM8260
- GPU: Adreno 220
- Memory: 1 GB RAM
- Storage: 32 GB (26 GB user available)
- Battery: 1750 mAh Li-ion (non-removable)
- Rear camera: 12.1 MP (Full HD 1080p); Aperture f/2.4 Autofocus, LED flash, touch focus, geo-tagging
- Front camera: 1.3 MP (720p)
- Display: 4.3 in (109.22 mm); 720 x 1280 pixels TFT LCD
- Media: Audio: MP3/eAAC+/WMA/WAV; Video: MP4/H.263/H.264/WMV
- Connectivity: Wi-Fi (802.11 a/b/g/n); Bluetooth 3.0 (A2DP, EDR); DLNA; NFC; GPS + GLONASS; USB 2.0
- Data inputs: Multi-touch capacitive touchscreen
- Other: Accelerometer, gyroscope, digital compass, proximity sensor, ambient light sensor
- Website: Official website (Chinese, archived)

The Sony Xperia SL (model number LT26ii) is a touchscreen Android smartphone from the Xperia series developed by Sony, announced on August 20, 2012. It was launched in September 2012 as the successor to the Sony Xperia S.

== Technical specifications ==
=== Design & Hardware ===
It was available at 4 color options:

Color	Black
	Black
	White
	Pink
	Silver

With dimensions at 128 x 64 x 10.6 mm, the device is equipped with a 4.3-inch (109.22 mm) TFT LCD display with a resolution of 720 x 1280 pixels, providing a pixel density of 342 ppi.

The smartphone is powered by a dual-core 1.7 GHz Qualcomm Snapdragon S3 (MSM8260) processor (ARMv7 architecture) and an Adreno 220 GPU. It features 1 GB of RAM and 32 GB of internal storage (26 GB available to the user, with no expansion slot). The device includes a 12.1-megapixel main camera capable of recording Full HD video (1080p) at 30 frames per second, and a 1.3-megapixel front-facing camera (720p at 30 fps).

Connectivity options include Wi-Fi (802.11a/b/g/n), Bluetooth 3.0, DLNA, and NFC. It features a built-in antenna for GPS and GLONASS. The phone is powered by a 1750 mAh Li-ion battery, providing up to 410 hours (17.1 days) of standby time or 8.25 hours of talk time, and weighs 144 grams.

=== Software ===
The Sony Xperia SL was released with Android Ice Cream Sandwich version 4.0.4, with a final official update to version 4.1.2 Jelly Bean. It also features Sony's proprietary Timescape UI.

== Reception ==
A reviewer from PhoneArena rated the device 7 out of 10, stating that "Sony offers only minor improvements in the Xperia SL compared to the Xperia S". Positive advantages included the amount of internal storage, camera quality, display, design, and call quality. Disadvantages noted were the device's bulkiness for a 4.3-inch phone, limited viewing angles, and the responsiveness of the touch-sensitive keys.
