= Sony Xperia ZL =

Android smartphone

- Brand: Sony
- Manufacturer: Sony Mobile
- Type: Smartphone
- First released: March 2013; 13 years ago
- Availability by region: Russia: 6 March 2013; 13 years ago United States: 26 March 2013; 13 years ago Canada: 2 April 2013; 13 years ago Germany: 3 April 2013; 13 years ago Brazil: 22 April 2013; 13 years ago (as Sony Xperia ZQ)
- Predecessor: Sony Xperia T
- Successor: Sony Xperia ZL2/Z2a (Japan, Taiwan)
- Related: Sony Xperia Z Sony Xperia ZR; Sony Xperia Z1; Sony Xperia Z Ultra
- Compatible networks: GSM/GPRS/EDGE 850/900/1800/1900; HSPA+ 850/900/2100; LTE 800/850/900/1800/2100/2600
- Form factor: Slate
- Dimensions: 131.6 mm (5.18 in) H 69.3 mm (2.73 in) W 9.8 mm (0.39 in)
- Weight: 151 g (5.33 oz)
- Operating system: Android 4.1.2 Jelly Bean (initial); Android 4.2.2 Jelly Bean (upgradable); Android 4.3 Jelly Bean (upgradable); Android 4.4 KitKat (upgradable); 5.0.2 Lollipop (upgradable); 5.1.1 Lollipop (current; final global roll out)
- System-on-chip: Qualcomm Snapdragon S4 Pro APQ8064
- CPU: 1.5 GHz quad-core Krait
- GPU: Adreno 320
- Memory: 2 GB RAM
- Storage: 16 GB
- Removable storage: up to 128 GB microSDXC
- Battery: 2,370 mAh
- Rear camera: 13.1 MP back-side illuminated sensor with LED flash 1080p video recording @ 30 frames/s Exmor RS
- Front camera: 2.2 MP, Exmor R
- Display: 5 in (130 mm) diagonal IPS; 1920x1080 px (441 ppi)
- Connectivity: 4G LTE (80 mbps); GPS; GLONASS; Micro USB 2.0; Bluetooth 4.0; NFC; Wi-Fi (802.11 a/b/g/n); DLNA; MHL
- Data inputs: Multi-touch, capacitive touchscreen, proximity sensor
- Codename: Odin
- SAR: Head: 0.383 W/kg 1 g Body: 0.825 W/kg 1 g Hotspot: 1.238 W/kg 1 g
- Other: Available in black and white
- References: Official website; Sony Xperia ZL LTE C6503 white paper; Sony Xperia ZL HSPA+ white paper; Sony Xperia ZL LTE C6506 white paper

The Sony Xperia ZL (C650x), marketed as the Sony Xperia ZQ in Brazil, is a touchscreen enabled, full HD Android smartphone designed, developed, and marketed by Sony Mobile. The ZL was announced by Sony at CES 2013. The device was launched with Android 4.1 Jelly Bean. This is among a few phones with HDR video taking capability. This phone comes with a full HD display (1920×1080) with a ppi of approximately 443 and a 13MP main camera with LED flash.

The Xperia ZL is a compact and cheaper variant of the Sony Xperia Z, and compromises water and dust proofing, as well as design language for a thinner frame.

Unlike the Xperia Z, it is also equipped with an infrared blaster and a dedicated camera button.

== Technical specifications ==
- 5" 1080×1920p full HD Reality Display with Mobile BRAVIA Engine 2
- 13 MP Fast Capture camera with Exmor RS for mobile, the first image sensor with HDR video for smartphones
- Compact design – display is 75% of front panel
- One-touch functions
- IR blaster – remote support for Sony BRAVIA televisions and other consumer electronics
- TFT capacitive touch screen
- Available in three colors: black, white and red

== See also ==
- Sony Xperia Z series
