= Sony Xperia Z3 Compact =

Android smartphone by Sony Xperia

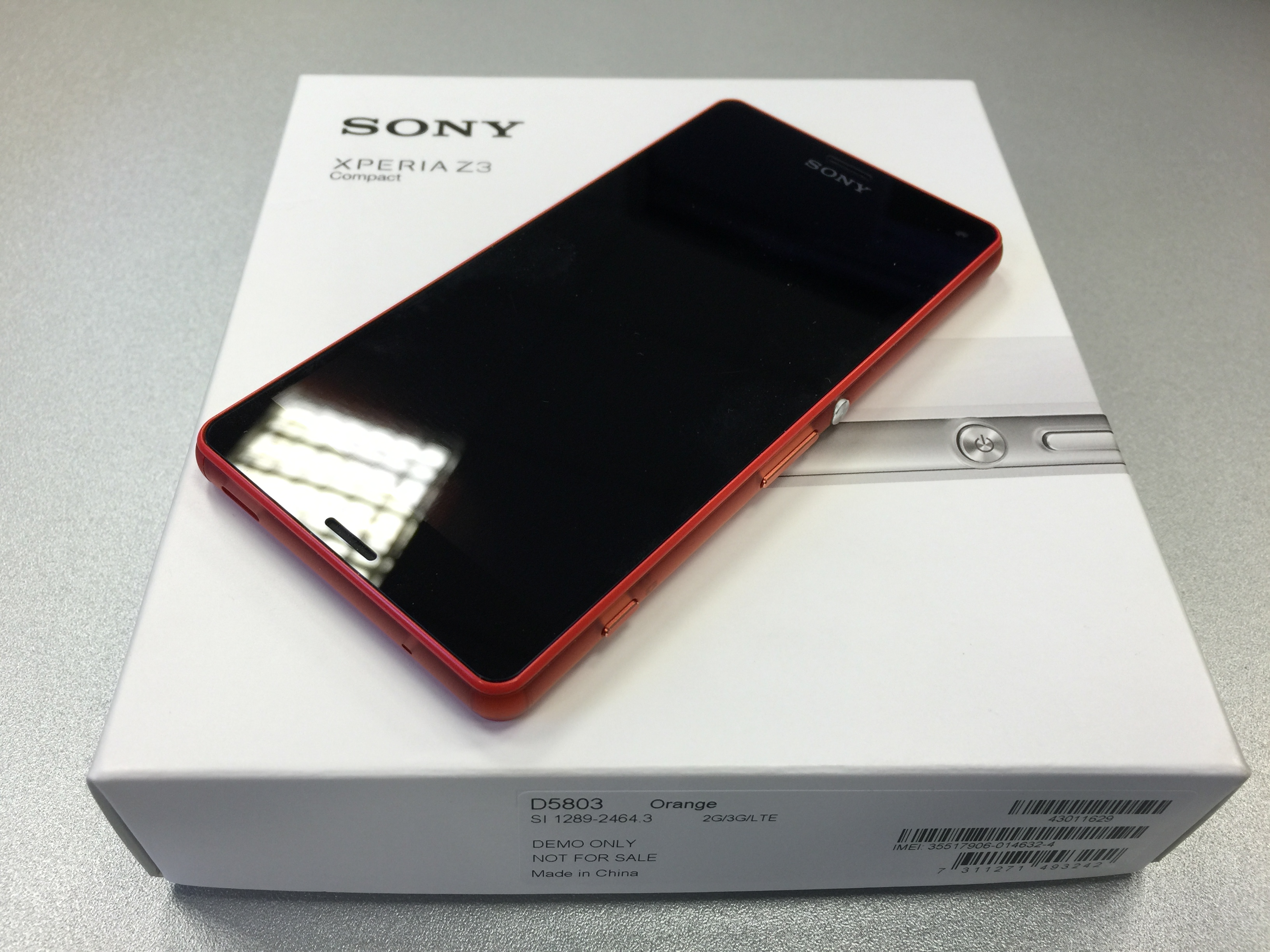
- Sony Xperia Z3 Compact
- Brand: Sony
- Manufacturer: Sony Mobile Communications
- Type: Touchscreen smartphone
- Series: Sony Xperia
- First released: 4 October 2014; 12 years ago (Singapore) 13 October 2014; 12 years ago (United States) 12 November 2014; 12 years ago (Japan, SO-02G variant exclusively for NTT DoCoMo)
- Predecessor: Sony Xperia Z1 Compact (Global); Sony Xperia J1 Compact (Japan); Sony Xperia A2 (Japan); Sony Xperia ZL2/Z2A (Japan, Taiwan)
- Successor: Sony Xperia Z5 Compact (Global); Sony Xperia A4 (Japan)
- Related: Sony Xperia Z3; Sony Xperia Z3 Compact SO-02G (Japan); Sony Xperia A4 (Japan)
- Compatible networks: D5803: GSM, 3G, HSPA+, LTE D5833: GSM, 3G, HSPA+, LTE, TD-LTE
- Form factor: Slate, Omni-Balance
- Dimensions: 127.3 mm (5.01 in) H 64.9 mm (2.56 in) W 8.6 mm (0.34 in) D
- Weight: 129 g (4.6 oz)
- Operating system: Android 4.4.4 KitKat (launch) Android 6.0.1 Marshmallow (current) Android 10 (unofficial alternative)
- System-on-chip: Qualcomm Snapdragon 801
- CPU: 2.5 GHz quad-core Krait 400
- GPU: Adreno 330
- Memory: 2 GB
- Storage: 16 GB
- Removable storage: Up to 128 GB microSDXC
- Battery: non-user removable Li-ion 2600 mAh
- Rear camera: Sony G Lens 20.7 MP 1/2.3" Exmor RS IMX220S back-side illuminated sensor with BIONZ™ Engine for mobile image processor and LED flash 2160p video recording @ 30 frames/s 1080p video recording @ 30/60 frames/s 720p video recording @ 30/120 frames/s
- Front camera: 2.2 MP
- Display: 4.6 in (117 mm) diagonal IPS LCD; 720x1280 px (319 PPI)
- Connectivity: List: Wi-Fi :802.11 a/b/g/n/ac (2.4/5 GHz); Wi-Fi hotspot; DLNA; Miracast; MirrorLink; NFC; Bluetooth 4.0; ANT+; USB 2.0 micro-B port; MHL 3.0; 3.5 millimetres (0.14 in) headphone jack
- Data inputs: Multi-touch, capacitive touchscreen, proximity sensor, GNSS (GPS/GLONASS/BeiDou)
- Model: D5803, D5833, SO-02G
- SAR: Head 0.95 W/kg; Body 1.00 W/kg
- Other: Available in black, white, orange and green IP65/IP68 (Dust protected, Water jet protected & Waterproof); Remote Play; Magnetic charging port Osaifu-Keitai (SO-02G variant only); NOTTV (SO-02G variant only); POBox Plus (SO-02G variant only)
- Website: Official website

The Sony Xperia Z3 Compact is an Android smartphone produced by Sony. As part of the Z Series, the Z3 Compact was unveiled during a press conference in IFA 2014 on 4 September 2014 and belongs to Sony's handset lineup of the second half of 2014, which includes the flagship Xperia Z3 and the entry-level Xperia C3. Like the preceding Z1 Compact (as no Z2 Compact was produced), the Z3 Compact is water-proof with an IP rating of IP65 and IP68. The phone features a new display, a Qualcomm Snapdragon 801 processor, and has the ability to record 4K videos.

== Design ==
The Z3 Compact is designed with what Sony describes as "omni-balance", which is focused on balance and symmetry. Instead of a metal frame, the phone has curved edges and translucent plastic with tempered glass on the front and back. Measuring 8.6 mm thick, the device is thicker than the Z3, but is lighter, weighing at 129 g, due to its smaller size.

== Specifications ==
=== Hardware ===
The Sony Xperia Z3 Compact features a 4.6 inch BRAVIA IPS Triluminos display with a resolution of 720 by 1280 pixels (HD) with a pixel density of 319 ppi. With Live LED technology, it combines red and green phosphorus with blue LEDs to produce brighter and more uniform light without over-saturation, allowing the display to reproduce colors that are more vibrant and brighter.

It comes with a 20.7 megapixel camera, the same as the Z3, with an Exmor RS sensor and an ISO rating of 12800, designed to improve image quality in low light conditions. The camera features Sony G Lens, which is aimed at giving a wider frame for taking photos, and is also capable of filming in 4K.

On the inside, the Xperia Z3 Compact features a quad-core Qualcomm Snapdragon 801 processor (a tweaked version of the Snapdragon 800) clocked at 2.5 GHz with a high capacity 2600 mAh battery, 2 GB of RAM and 16 GB of storage, about 11 GB of which are available for the user and supporting a microSD card.

=== Software ===
The Z3 Compact initially ran Android 4.4.4 KitKat with Sony's custom launcher and some additional applications, such as Sony's media applications (Walkman, Album and Movies). The Z3 Compact can play PlayStation 4 games via Remote Play.

Sony began an upgrade for both the Z3 Compact and the Z3 to Android 5.0 "Lollipop" and announced upgrades for other Xperia Z devices in March 2015. Starting in July 2015, Sony released an Android 5.1.1 update for the Z2, Z3 and Z3 Compact, with the other Xperia Z devices following shortly after. On 6 October 2015, Sony confirmed that the Xperia Z3 Compact will be updated to Android 6.0 Marshmallow. Sony released the official Android 6.0.1 Marshmallow update in April 2016.

The bootloader can be unlocked on both Z3 Compact and Z3 in order to install a custom ROM, but will void the warranty and delete the DRM keys, disabling the camera noise reduction feature and access to Sony Entertainment Network.

== Reception ==
The Z3 Compact received generally positive reviews, with PC Advisor describing it as a great little smartphone offering everything available on the full-size Z3, with a design that is thinner and lighter with a larger display than the previous Z1 Compact. The Verge praised the Z3 Compact's small size while retaining the excellent battery life and performance specs of the Z3 flagship, drawing an analogy between the iPhone 6 and iPhone 6 Plus which shared most of their hardware despite the size difference, the only caveat was that the Z3 Compact had a plastic frame compared to the full-size Z3's metal frame. The Register praised the phone for its outstanding battery life. CNET gave the device a score of 8.0, praising its design, performance and battery life, but criticizing issues with the camera.

=== Technical problems ===
There have been reports of self cracking screens.

Preceded by Sony Xperia Z1 Compact	Sony Xperia Z3 Compact; 2014	Succeeded by Sony Xperia Z5 Compact
