= Sony Xperia Z1 Compact =

Android smartphone by Sony Xperia

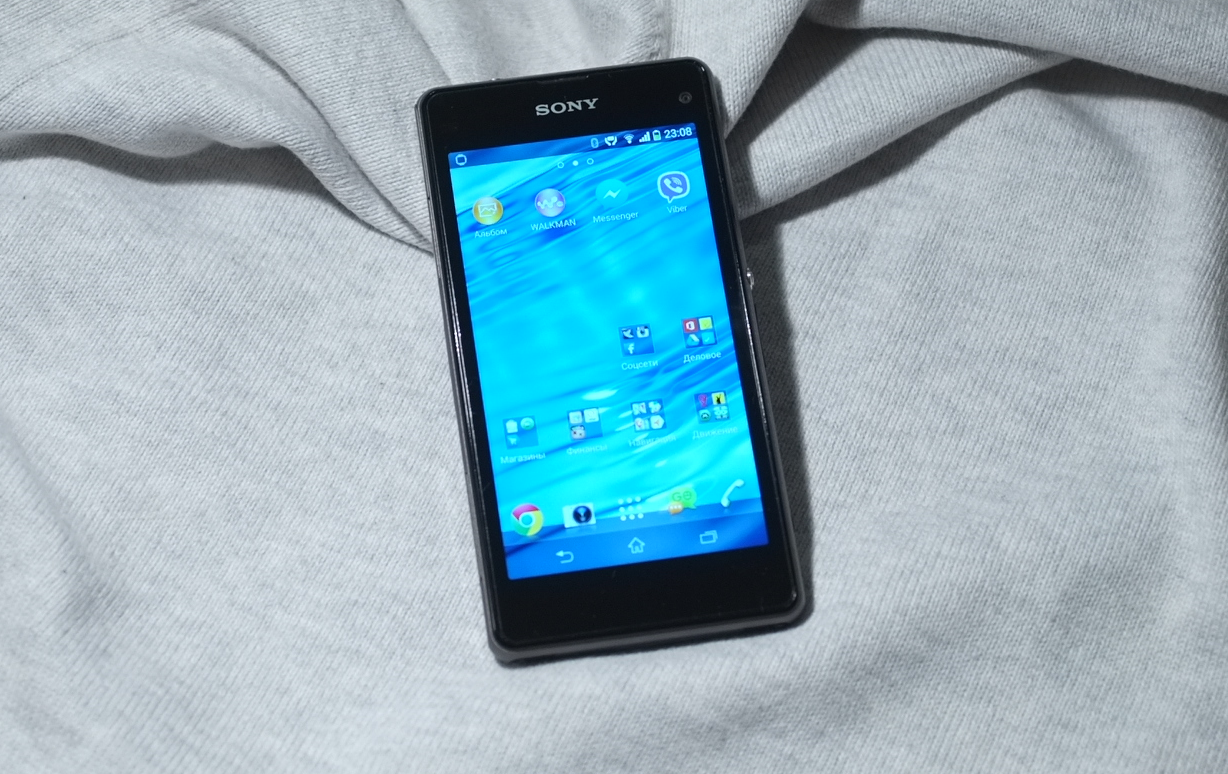
- Brand: Sony
- Manufacturer: Sony Mobile Communications
- Type: Touchscreen smartphone
- Series: Sony Xperia
- First released: 19 December 2013; 12 years ago (SO-02F/Sony Xperia Z1 f variant); 24 January 2014; 12 years ago (Sony Xperia Z1 Compact)
- Availability by region: 19 December 2013; 12 years ago (Japan, SO-02F/Sony Xperia Z1 f variant exclusively for NTT DoCoMo) 24 January 2014; 12 years ago (Sweden) 30 January 2014; 12 years ago (UK) 6 February 2014; 12 years ago (France) 7 February 2014; 12 years ago (Taiwan) 18 March 2014; 12 years ago (Asia)
- Predecessor: Sony Xperia ZR; Sony Xperia A (Japan); Sony Xperia SX (Japan)
- Successor: Sony Xperia Z3 Compact (Global); Sony Xperia A2 (Japan); Sony Xperia J1 Compact (Japan)
- Related: Sony Xperia Z1; Sony Xperia Z Ultra; Sony Xperia Z1 SOL23 (Japan); Sony Xperia Z1 SO-01F (Japan); Sony Xperia Z1 f (Japan); Sony Xperia A2 (Japan); Sony Xperia J1 Compact (Japan)
- Form factor: Slate
- Dimensions: 127 mm (5.0 in) H 64.9 mm (2.56 in) W 9.5 mm (0.37 in) D
- Weight: 137 g (4.8 oz)
- Operating system: Android 4.3 Jelly Bean (launch); Android 4.4.4 KitKat; Android 5.0.2 Lollipop; Android 5.1.1 Lollipop
- System-on-chip: Qualcomm Snapdragon 800 (MSM8974)
- CPU: 2.2 GHz quad-core Krait 400 (2.2 GHz Qualcomm MSM8974 Quad Core)
- GPU: Adreno 330 - 450 MHz
- Memory: 2 GB RAM
- Storage: 16 GB
- Removable storage: up to 64 GB microSDXC
- Battery: non-user removable Li-ion 2300 mAh
- Rear camera: Sony G Lens 20.7 MP 1/2.3" Exmor RS IMX220 back-side illuminated sensor with BIONZ™ Engine for mobile image processor and LED flash 1080p video recording @ 30 frames/s 720p video recording @ 30 frames/s VIA root access 2160p video recording @ 30 frames/s 1080p video recording @ 60 frames/s (Exclusive to Android 5.0.2); 720p video recording @ 120 frames/s
- Front camera: 2.2 MP (1080p video recording)
- Display: 4.3 in (110 mm) diagonal IPS LCD; 720x1280 px (342 PPI); 515 cd/m2
- Sound: Stereo
- Connectivity: Wi-Fi DLNA; GPS/GLONASS; NFC; Bluetooth 4.0 ANT+
- Data inputs: Multi-touch up to 10 fingers, capacitive touchscreen, proximity sensor
- Model: International D5503; Docomo SO-02F; Chinese M51w
- Codename: Amami
- Other: Available in white, black, pink and lime IP55 / IP58 (Dust protected, Water jet protected & Waterproof); Magnetic charge port PlayStation App; TrackID; 4k video playback support Osaifu-Keitai (SO-02F variant only); 1seg (SO-02F variant only); NOTTV (SO-02F variant only); POBox Touch 6.2 (SO-02F variant only)
- Website: Official website

The Sony Xperia Z1 Compact is an Android smartphone produced by Sony. The Z1 Compact has a 4.3 inch display and is released as a cheaper and smaller version of the flagship Xperia Z1 which features a 5-inch display. The Z1 Compact is the first Sony smartphone to use an IPS panel, which improves markedly upon the poor viewing angles of the Xperia Z1 and its flagship predecessors like the Xperia Z and Xperia ZL.

The Japanese version of the Z1 Compact, dubbed the Sony Xperia Z1 f (SO-02F), was unveiled on 10 October 2013 and was released on 19 December 2013 exclusively for NTT DoCoMo. The international Z1 Compact was subsequently unveiled during a press conference at CES 2014 in Las Vegas on 6 January 2014 and was first released in Sweden on 24 January 2014; entering more markets in February and March 2014.

== Hardware ==
Like its larger sibling, the Z1 Compact is waterproof and dust proof, and has an IP rating of IP55 and IP58. The key highlight of the Z1 Compact is its 20.7 megapixel Exmor RS camera, paired with Sony's in-house G lens and its image processing algorithm, called BIONZ. The phone also comes with a dedicated shutter button and has an aluminum unibody design, with a glass front and a plastic rear. The product white paper for this device was updated in mid-February 2014 to reflect the use of plastic on the rear panel, rather than the initially reported glass. It is now running on Android 5.1.1, which is its last update.

== See also ==
- Sony Xperia Z series
