= Sony Xperia T =

2012 Android smartphone

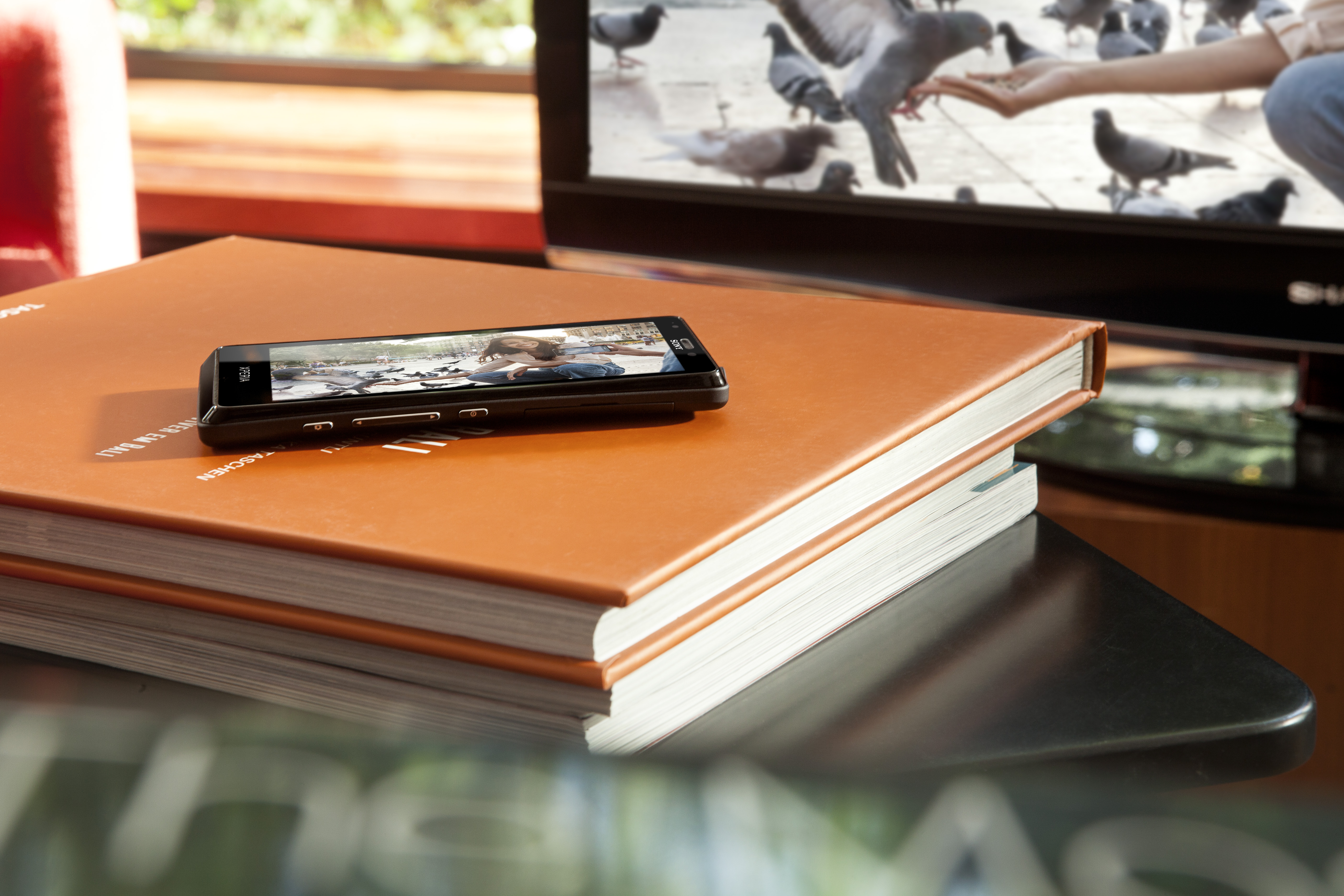
- Manufacturer: Sony Mobile
- Type: Smartphone
- Series: Sony Xperia
- First released: October 2012
- Predecessor: Xperia S Xperia Ion
- Successor: Xperia Z Xperia ZL
- Related: Xperia TX; Sony Xperia V
- Compatible networks: GSM 850/900/1800/1900; HSPA+ 850/900/1700/1900/2100; LTE Band II/IV/V/XVII
- Form factor: Slate
- Dimensions: 129.4 mm (5.09 in) H 67.3 mm (2.65 in) W 9.4 mm (0.370 in) D
- Weight: 139 g (4.90 oz)
- Operating system: Original: Android 4.0.3 Ice Cream Sandwich; Current: Android 4.3 Jelly Bean
- System-on-chip: Snapdragon S4 Plus MSM8260A; MSM8960 (LTE models)
- CPU: 1.5 GHz dual-core Krait
- GPU: Adreno 225
- Memory: 1 GB RAM
- Storage: 16 GB
- Removable storage: Up to 32 GB microSD
- Battery: 1850 mAh LiPo
- Rear camera: 13.0 MP with f/2.4 aperture, 16× digital zoom, back-illuminated sensor Exmor R for mobile CMOS sensor, autofocus, face recognition, sweep panorama, geo-tagging, stabilizer, smile detection, touch focus, Video: 1080p @ 30fps, continuous autofocus, light, stabilizer.
- Front camera: 1.3 MPx; Video: 720p @ 30fps
- Display: 4.55 in (116 mm) diagonal IPS LCD 1280×720 (323 ppi)
- Connectivity: NFC; Bluetooth 3.1 with A2DP, EDR micro-USB 2.0; USB On-The-Go; 3.5 mm audio jack aGPS; Wi-Fi 802.11 a/b/g/n HDMI (MHL over micro USB)

Sony Xperia T (renamed Sony Xperia TL in the United States) is an Android-based smartphone manufactured by Sony Mobile. Introduced on 29 August 2012, it is Sony Mobile's last device ever introduced to feature the Sony Ericsson liquid energy logo after Sony acquired Ericsson's stake in Sony Ericsson in January 2012. It was released in October 2012.

== Specifications ==
=== Design ===
The design of the Xperia T represents an evolution of the Xperia Ion, with a curved, matte anodized aluminum body, side-mounted buttons, a recessed camera lens, and a circular contact point for near-field communications below the camera.

Xperia T features a 4.6-inch display with a "scratch-resistant" coating. There is an "Xperia" logo on the lower bezel of the display while there is a front-facing camera, a "Sony" logo, an earpiece, a proximity sensor and an ambient light sensor on the upper bezel of the display. The device does not feature any physical navigation buttons as the buttons are integrated into the software.

On the side frame; Xperia T has a microphone at the bottom, a secondary microphone and a 3.5 mm headphone jack at the top, a microUSB port at the left side and a microSIM card/microSD card tray and three buttons (that are the power button, the volume rocker and the shutter key from top to bottom, respectively) at the right side. The rear camera, the LED flash and the speaker are located at the back panel alongside the "Xperia" logo and the liquid energy logo of Ericsson.

Xperia T measures 129.4 x 67.3 x 9.35 mm and weighs 139 grams.

=== Hardware ===
The Xperia T features a 4.55-inch 720p (720x1280 pixels resolution) LCD with Mobile BRAVIA Engine and 323 ppi pixel density, Qualcomm Snapdragon S4 SoC with a 1.5 GHz dual-core (Krait) CPU, 1 GB of RAM, and 16 GB of internal storage that can be expanded by using a microSD card. The device also features a 13 megapixel rear-facing camera capable of Full HD (1080p) video recording at 30 fps and a 1.3 megapixel front-facing camera capable of HD (720p) video recording at 30 fps. It has a 1850 mAh battery and MHL support.

=== Software ===
The Xperia T is shipped with Android 4.0.4 "Ice Cream Sandwich" with Sony's custom user interface and software, and integrates with in-house services such as Sony Entertainment Network. The Smart Connect app allows actions to be triggered when specific events occur, such as scanning an NFC "SmartTag". The user interface also allows the use of pop-up "small apps".

An update to Android 4.1.2 "Jelly Bean" was released 8 July 2013. An update to Android 4.3 was released in February 2014, introducing a refreshed user interface. The Xperia T was not officially upgraded to Android 4.4 "KitKat".

== Release ==
The Xperia T was released in three models; the LT30P is the main international HSPA+ version. Two LTE models were released, the LT30A, and the Sony Xperia TL—an AT&T-branded model for the United States.

The Xperia T was cross-promoted with the then-latest installment in the James Bond film franchise, Skyfall (released by Sony subsidiary Columbia Pictures), which features product placement of the device being used by the title character. The AT&T, O2 (United Kingdom), and Canadian models of the Xperia T were bundled with James Bond-themed content, including a Gun barrel sequence wallpaper, special ringtones, behind-the-scenes footage, and geotagged photos from the filming of Skyfall.

== Reception ==
The Xperia T received mixed to positive reviews. Casey Johnston of Ars Technica praised the screen's "crisp" and legible appearance, but found that its performance was underwhelming in comparison to competitors such as the LG Optimus G and iPhone 5. While the camera software was panned for lacking in functions, the camera itself was described as having a "decent" quality and adequate low-light performance, but did not handle scenes with bright lights well. Although outperforming Sony's estimates for battery life in regards to video playback (lasting for 6 hours and 15 minutes of video as opposed to estimates of 5 hours), the Xperia T's battery was also considered "insufficient", lasting eight to nine hours in regular use. In conclusion, Johnston felt that "given how the phone is calibrated relative to other offerings, the Bond association is at best nonsensical, at worst an insult to the Bond-quality technology legacy."

CNET felt that the Xperia TL was a major improvement over the Xperia Ion, citing its newer Android platform (albeit not using the latest version on-launch), better CPU, "snapping quality" camera, and fast LTE data speeds, but felt that the design of the T lacked "style" in comparison to devices such as the HTC One X, and that the display had low contrast and poor viewing angles in comparison to AMOLED displays such as the Samsung Galaxy S III.

GSMArena criticized the poor viewing angles of the display and low speakerphone loudness, felt that video recording could be better, and believed that the device was overpriced.

== See also ==
Preceded by Sony Xperia S	Sony Xperia T 2012	Succeeded by Sony Xperia Z
