= Sony Xperia ZR =

Android smartphone

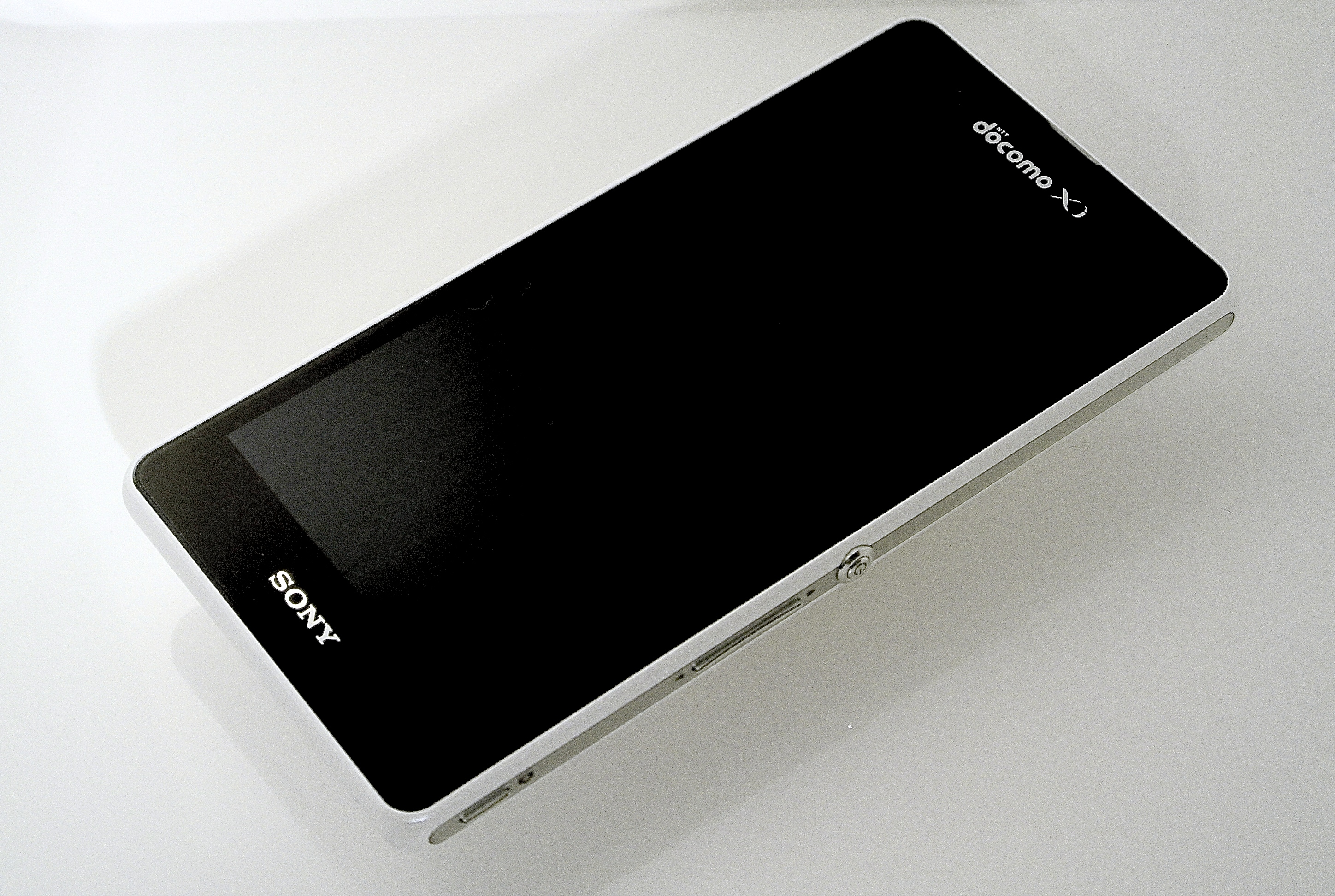
- Xperia A (This is a variant of the Xperia ZR tailored for the Japanese domestic market, also known as "docomo SO-04E")
- Brand: Sony
- Manufacturer: Sony Mobile Communications
- Type: Smartphone
- Series: Sony Xperia
- First released: 17 May 2013; 13 years ago
- Availability by region: 17 May 2013; 13 years ago (Japan, SO-04E/Sony Xperia A variant exclusively for NTT DoCoMo) 17 June 2013; 13 years ago (India, Taiwan) 4 July 2013; 12 years ago (Hong Kong, Netherlands, Russia, Sweden) 18 July 2013; 12 years ago (Malaysia) 22 August 2013; 12 years ago (USA) 18 September 2013; 12 years ago (Japan, Xperia feat. Hatsune Miku limited edition variant exclusively for NTT DoCoMo)
- Predecessor: Sony Xperia V
- Successor: Sony Xperia Z1 Compact; Sony Xperia Z1 f (Japan)
- Related: Sony Xperia ZL; Sony Xperia Z Sony Xperia A
- Compatible networks: UMTS HSPA+ 900 (Band VIII), 2100 (Band I) Mhz (not available in all markets); UMTS HSPA+ 850 (Band V), 1700 (Band IV), 1900 (Band II), 2100 (Band I) (not available in all markets) GSM GPRS/EDGE 850, 900, 1800, 1900 MHz
- Form factor: Slate
- Dimensions: 131.3 mm (5.17 in) H 67.3 mm (2.65 in) W 10.5 mm (0.41 in)
- Weight: 138 g (4.87 oz)
- Operating system: Android 4.1.2 "Jelly Bean" (initial); Android 4.2.2 "Jelly Bean" (2013 upgrade); Android 4.3 "Jelly Bean" (Dec 2013 upgrade); Android 4.4 "KitKat" (June 2014 upgrade); Android 5.0.2 "Lollipop"; Android 5.1.1 "Lollipop" (current, depend on location)
- System-on-chip: Qualcomm® Snapdragon™ S4 Pro APQ8064 processor / Qualcomm® Snapdragon™ 600 processor
- CPU: 1.5 GHz Qualcomm Quad Core
- GPU: Adreno 320
- Memory: 2 GB RAM
- Storage: 8 GB
- Removable storage: up to 32 GB microSDHC (officially) up to 64 GB microSDXC (unofficially)
- Battery: 2,330 mAh 13 hours talk time, 520 standby, removable
- Rear camera: 13 MP IMX135 Exmor RS back-side illuminated sensor with LED flash 1080p video recording @ 30 frames/s 16x Digital Zoom
- Front camera: VGA
- Display: 4.55 in (116 mm) diagonal TFT; 1280x720 px (~323 ppi) and Sony BRAVIA Engine 2 with scratch-resistant and shatterproof glass
- Connectivity: 4G LTE(100 Mbit/s) LTE (Bands 1, 3, 5, 7, 8, 20) GPS; GLONASS; Micro USB 2.0; Bluetooth 4.0; NFC; UMTS HSPA+ (Bands 1, 3, 5, 8 or bands 1, 2, 4, 5, 8); Wi-Fi (802.11 a/b/g/n); DLNA; GSM GPRS/EDGE 850, 900, 1800, 1900 MHz MHL
- Data inputs: Multi-touch, capacitive touchscreen, proximity sensor
- Other: Available in black, pink, cyan and white (Mint is exclusive to SO-04E/Xperia A, while Miku is exclusive to Xperia feat. Hatsune Miku); IP55 / IP58 (Dust protected, Water jet protected & Waterproof); Osaifu-Keitai (SO-04E/Xperia A and Xperia feat. Hatsune Miku variants only); 1seg (SO-04E/Xperia A and Xperia feat. Hatsune Miku variants only); NOTTV (SO-04E/Xperia A and Xperia feat. Hatsune Miku variants only); POBox Touch 6.1 (SO-04E/Xperia A and Xperia feat. Hatsune Miku variants only)

The Sony Xperia ZR (models C5502 and C5503 for LTE support), also known as Sony Dogo, is a touchscreen-enabled, HD Android flagship smartphone designed, developed, and marketed by Sony Mobile.

The smartphone was announced by Sony at CES 2013 and was released on 17 May 2013 in Japan. The Xperia ZR was initially shipped with Android 4.1.2 (Jelly Bean) and has eventually been updated to Android 5.1.1 (Lollipop). The smartphone has Ingress Protection Ratings of IP55 and IP58, making it dust protected, low pressure water jet protected, and waterproof. Sony's internal test showed that there is no water intrusion after testing Xperia ZR in 1.5-metre of water for 30 minutes. Xperia ZR also features a 13 MP IMX135 Exmor RS camera sensor as well as an HD (720 x 1280 pixels) display, encompassed in Sony's Industrial 'Omni-Balance' Design.

The Xperia ZR was received positively in Japan where it is marketed as Sony Xperia A (SO-04E). In September 2013 carrier NTT DoCoMo released a limited edition of the A called "Xperia feat. Hatsune Miku."

== See also ==
- Sony Xperia Z series
