= Sony Xperia Z =

Android smartphone

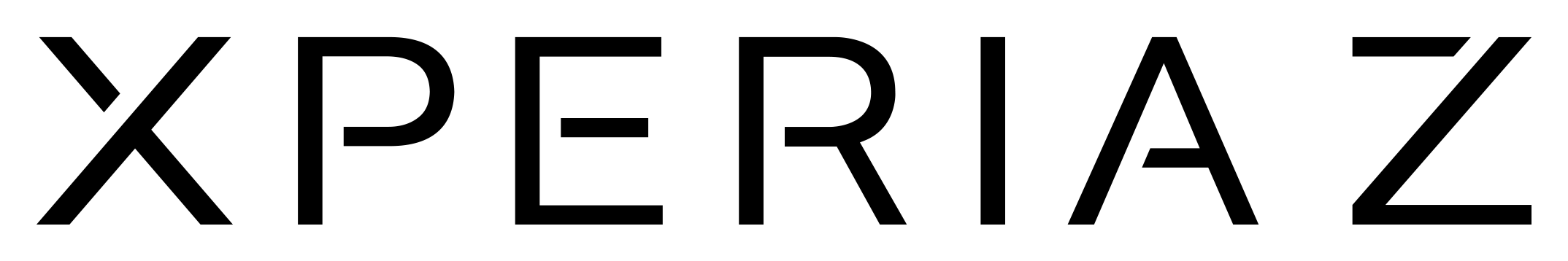

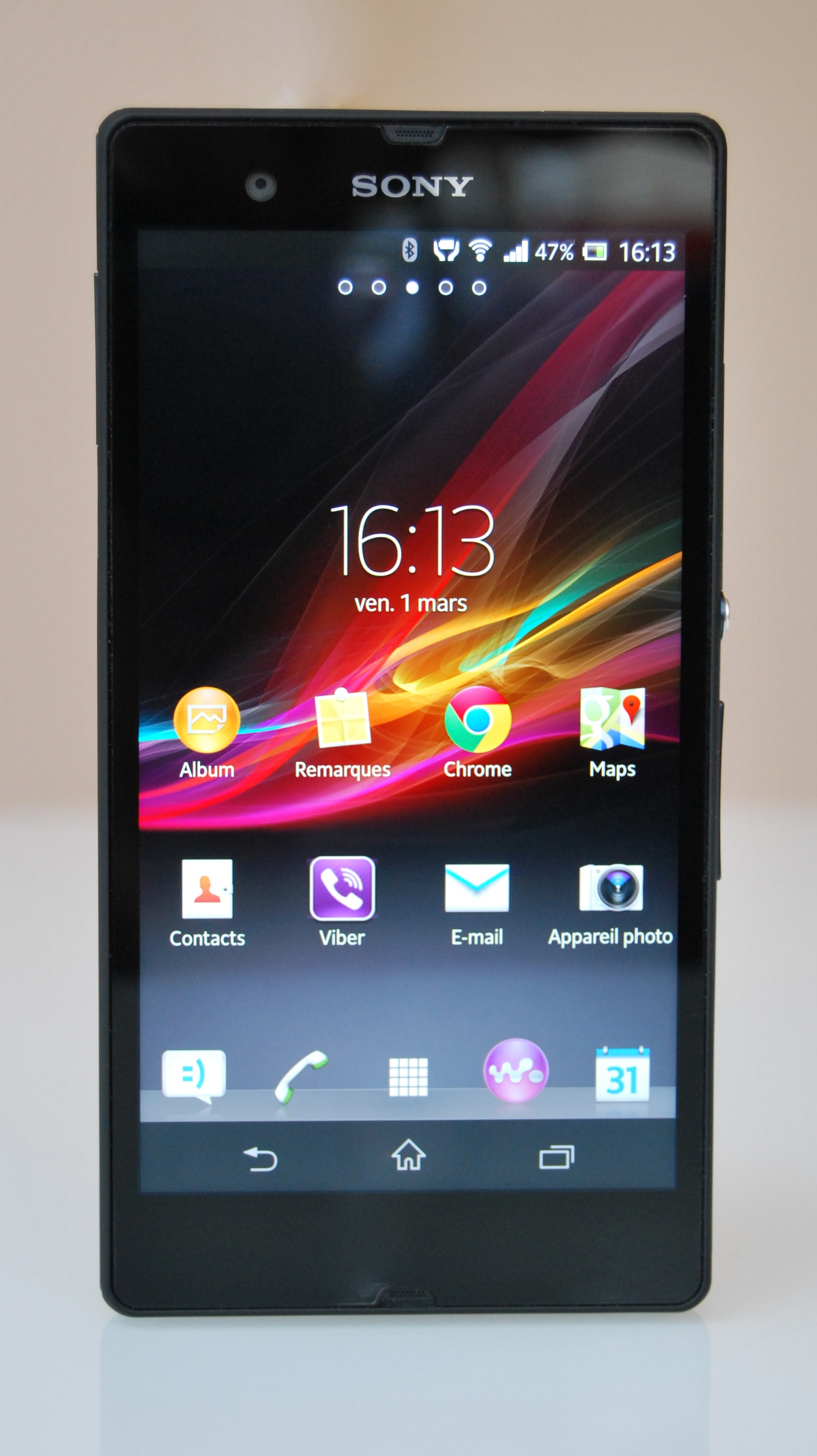
- Brand: Sony
- Manufacturer: Sony Mobile Communications
- Type: Touchscreen smartphone
- Series: Xperia Z Series
- First released: 9 February 2013; 13 years ago
- Availability by region: List of dates: 9 February 2013; 13 years ago (Japan, SO-02E variant exclusively for NTT DoCoMo) 1 March 2013; 13 years ago (Singapore, UK) 12 March 2013; 13 years ago (India) 13 March 2013; 13 years ago (Australia) 14 March 2013; 13 years ago (New Zealand) 15 March 2013; 13 years ago (Malaysia)
- Predecessor: Xperia T Xperia TX
- Successor: Xperia Z1
- Related: Xperia ZL; Xperia ZR
- Compatible networks: GSM/GPRS/EDGE 850/900/1800/1900; HSPA+ 800/850/900/1700/1900/2100; LTE 800/850/900/1500/1800/2100/2600 (Network specifications varies across models)
- Form factor: Slate, Omni-balance
- Dimensions: 139 mm (5.5 in) H 71 mm (2.8 in) W 7.9 mm (0.31 in)
- Weight: 152 g (5.36 oz)
- Operating system: Android: 4.1.2 Jelly Bean (initial); 4.2.2 Jelly Bean; 4.3 Jelly Bean; 4.4.2 KitKat 4.4.4 KitKat; 5.0.2 Lollipop; 5.1.1 Lollipop (current); Unofficial Android 12L
- System-on-chip: Qualcomm Snapdragon S4 Pro APQ8064
- CPU: 1.5 GHz quad-core Krait 300 (1.5 GHz Qualcomm APQ8064+MDM9215M Quad Core)
- GPU: Adreno 320
- Memory: 2 GB RAM
- Storage: 16 GB
- Removable storage: up to 32 GB microSDHC (officially) up to 128 GB microSDXC (unofficially)
- Battery: Non-user removable li-ion 2330 mAh
- Rear camera: 13.1 MP Exmor RS IMX 135, backside illuminated sensor with LED flash and HDR 1080p video recording @ 30 fps and 16x digital zoom
- Front camera: 2.2 MP Exmor R sensor (1080p video recording)
- Display: 5.0 in (130 mm) Full HD TFT multitouch capacitive touch screen with 441 ppi, 16 million colours, Bravia Engine 2 and scratch resistant glass protection
- Sound: Walkman Music Player with Clear Audio+, Clear Stereo, Clear Phase, XLoud
- Connectivity: Wi-Fi; DLNA; Miracast; GPS/GLONASS; NFC; Bluetooth 4.0; MHL; HDMI (via MHL); IR Blaster (SO-02E variant only); Screen Mirroring; DualShock 3
- Data inputs: Multi-touch, capacitive touchscreen, accelerometer, proximity sensor, gyroscope, compass
- Codename: Yuga
- Hearing aid compatibility: Support
- Other: Available in White, Black, and Purple; IP55 / IP57 (Dust protected, Water jet protected & Waterproof up to 1 meter in 30 minutes); 1seg (SO-02E variant only); Osaifu-Keitai (SO-02E variant only); NOTTV (SO-02E variant only); POBox Touch 5.4 (SO-02E variant only); Charging With Dock Charger

The Sony Xperia Z is an Android-based smartphone by Sony. Announced at CES 2013 the phone was officially released on 9 February 2013 in Japan and 1 March 2013 in Singapore and the UK. It was released in the U.S months later. The Xperia Z was initially shipped with the Android 4.1.2 (Jelly Bean) operating system. The smartphone has Ingress Protection Ratings of IP55 and IP57. It also contains a 13.1 MP Exmor RS camera sensor, and the screen of the phone consists of a TFT 1920x1080 display, with 441 ppi. It would be the first smartphone in the Sony Xperia Z series, continuing all the way up to the Xperia Z5.

Alongside the Xperia Z, Sony unveiled a variant called the Sony Xperia ZL, which uses the same hardware as the Xperia Z, but sacrifices water resistance for a smaller frame, a physical camera button and an infrared blaster.

In June 2013, Sony unveiled a phablet version of the Xperia Z called the Sony Xperia Z Ultra.

Its successor, the Sony Xperia Z1, was released on 20 September 2013.

== Design ==
The body of the Xperia Z is a rectangular slab compared to Sony's more curved Xperia T and Xperia Arc S. This design is called "OmniBalance", which "is focused on creating balance and symmetry in all directions", according to Sony. The Xperia Z has subtly rounded edges and reflective surfaces on all sides, which are held together by a skeleton frame made from glass fiber polyamide. The aluminum power button is placed on the right-hand side of the device, which is said to make one-handed operation of the phone easier.

== Hardware ==
=== Dimensions, design, and battery ===
The phone's dimensions are stated to be 139 x 71 x 7.9 mm, and its weight is 146 grams (including the battery). It has a non-user-replaceable lithium-ion battery, rated at 2330 mAh.

The phone is covered on the front and back by tempered glass, where the front is Dragontrail Glass from Asahi Glass Company resin-bonded to the LCD, and the back is Corning Gorilla Glass.

=== Camera ===
It includes a 13.1-megapixel rear camera with an Exmor RS IMX135 image sensor, flash, image stabilization, HDR, face detection (with red-eye reduction), Sweep Panorama, scene recognition and 16x digital zoom, and a 2.2-megapixel front camera with a Sony Exmor R sensor. Both cameras record video at 1080p.

The rear camera is one of the first mobile phone cameras that can capture HDR video.

The camera software is equipped with a quick launch feature, also known as fast capture, allowing the optional automatic capture of a photo or record video immediately after launch from the lock screen.

The burst shot mode of the Xperia Z has three-speed settings: high speed (0.9 megapixels), middle (9.6 megapixels), and low (2.1 megapixels). For unknown reasons, the resolution at the lowest speed setting is lower than at the medium speed setting. At the highest speed setting, the device can capture 1000 photos within 68 seconds.

Tests suggest that poor image processing in the automatic (standard) camera mode leads to a quality loss that photos captured through burst mode appear higher in comparison.

=== Display ===
The smartphone has a capacitive touchscreen with a size of 5", and its resolution is 1920x1080 pixels (1080p) at 441 ppi, with 16 million colors. The screen uses Sony's Mobile BRAVIA Engine 2 for picture and video enhancement.

=== Chipsets and storage ===
The smartphone ships with a Qualcomm Snapdragon S4 Pro chipset, 2 GB RAM, 16 GB of internal storage flash memory (with approx. 11 GB available to the user) and a microSD card slot which accepts cards up to 128 GB.

=== Interfaces and connectivity ===
The smartphone has a built-in 3.5 mm audio jack for headphones, GPS and GLONASS support, Bluetooth 4.0, Wi-Fi, HDMI (via MHL), MirrorLink 1.0, Miracast and NFC, in addition to being DLNA certified. In Japan, the smartphone features an infrared blaster.

NFC is a core feature of the device. The device is certified to IP55 and IP57 standards to be dust-protected, low-pressure water jet-protected and waterproof, allowing immersion under 1 meter of water for up to 30 minutes.

== Software ==
The Xperia Z originally ran Android 4.1.2 Jelly Bean with Sony's launcher and additional applications, including Sony's media applications (Walkman, Album, and Movies), as well as a battery stamina mode. The device received an update to Android 4.2.2 (Jelly Bean) on 24 June 2013. In December 2013, the Android 4.3 Jelly Bean software update rolled out for Xperia Z devices. In May 2014, the Android 4.4.2 KitKat software update rolled out, followed by Android 4.4.4 in September 2014.

On 16 October 2014, Sony reported that it would be updating the entire Xperia Z lineup of devices to Android 5.0 Lollipop, beginning in early 2015, for the core Xperia Z3 and Xperia Z2 devices, with others following soon after. Later in CES 2015 at Sony's event, they announced that the Android 5.0 Lollipop would be rolled out to the Xperia Z series starting in February 2015.

On 29 May 2015, Sony released Android 5.0 Lollipop for the Xperia Z, followed by Android 5.0.2 on 23 May 2015. On 7 September 2015, Sony released Android 5.1 Lollipop for the Xperia Z. This was the final firmware update for the device, as Android 6.0 Marshmallow was released for the Xperia Z2 and later Xperia devices only.

== Network compatibility ==
The following table shows which UMTS and LTE bands are supported. See the list of UMTS networks and the list of LTE networks to find which bands are required to use a cell phone service provider.

Model	FCC id	UMTS bands	LTE bands	Carrier/region
C6602	PY7PM-0280	1, 2, 4, 5, 8	None	Worldwide
C6603	PY7PM-0270	1, 5, 8	1, 3, 5, 7, 8, 20	Worldwide
C6606	PY7PM-05200	1, 2, 4, 5, 8	4	T-Mobile USA
C6616	PY7PM-0520	1, 2, 4, 5, 8	4	Bell Canada
SO-02E	PY7PM-0220	1, 5, 6, 19	1, 19, 21	NTT DoCoMo

All variants support four 2G GSM bands: 850/900/1800/1900.

== Reception and sales ==
The Xperia Z has received mostly positive reviews from critics. Damien McFerren of CNET gave the phone 4 and a half stars out of five and said "The Sony Xperia Z combines looks, power and connectivity to supply one of the most impressive Android experiences we've seen in quite some time. The lack of Android 4.2 at launch is unfortunate and that 5-inch screen isn't going to suit everyone, but there's little room for complaint elsewhere. This is easily Sony's best phone yet, and one of the best Android phones ever released".

Android Central gave the phone a positive review, saying "For Android fans, the Sony Xperia Z was one of the highlights of a fairly quiet CES. A 5-inch, 1080p phone with a bold new design language and fancy new camera technology, the Xperia Z was probably the most compelling phone of the show. And just a couple of months later, it's now available to buy in the UK. Without a doubt, Sony Mobile's new baby is one of the largest, with full specs Android phones around".

Audience reactions to the phone have also been positive. At CES 2013, the Xperia Z won the ‘Best Smartphone' and ‘Best of Show' awards. According to Sony executive Calum McDougall, early Xperia Z sales have been strong. He states, "It [the Xperia smartphone] sold over 150,000 units in its first week in Japan, taking a 24 percent market share straight away." "It may be a bit too early to say but the first signs are very positive."

== See also ==
- Sony Xperia Z series
- LTE (telecommunication) (3GPP Long Term Evolution)
- LTE Advanced (next version of LTE)
- List of LTE networks
- UMTS frequency bands
- E-UTRA

Preceded by Sony Xperia T & Sony Xperia TX	Sony Xperia Z 2013	Succeeded by Sony Xperia Z1
