= Sony Xperia V =

Android smartphone by Sony Mobile

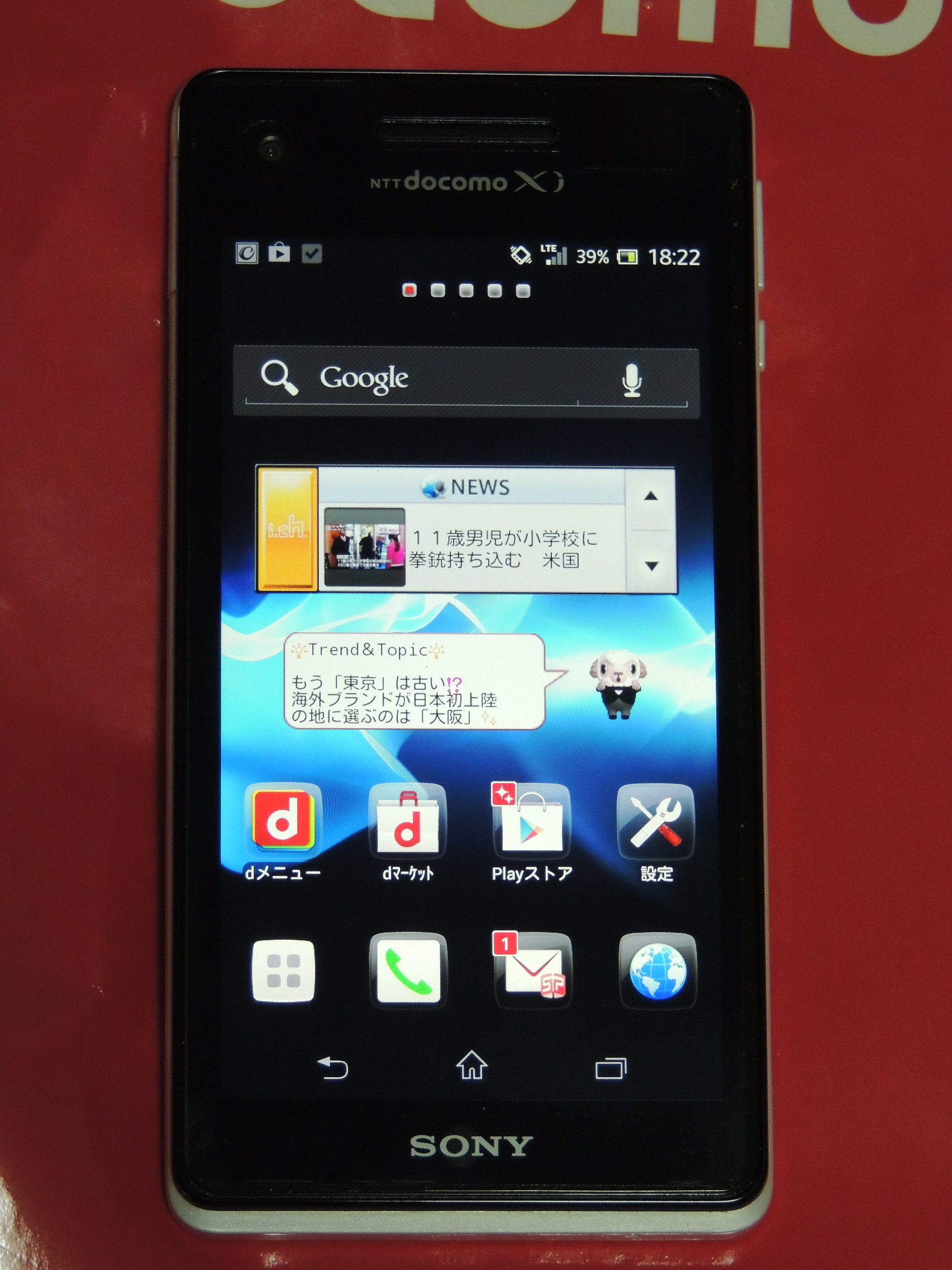
- Brand: Sony
- Manufacturer: Sony Mobile Communications
- Type: Touchscreen smartphone
- Series: Sony Xperia
- First released: Q4 2012
- Predecessor: Sony Xperia acro S
- Successor: Sony Xperia ZR
- Related: Sony Xperia T Sony Xperia TX; Sony Xperia J Sony Xperia AX SO-01E (Japan); Sony Xperia VL SOL21 (Japan)
- Compatible networks: 2G GSM/EDGE/GPRS: 850, 900, 1800, 1900 MHz; 3G UMTS/HSUPA/HSDPA+: 850, 900, 2100 MHz; 4G LTE: 800, 850, 1800, 2100, 2600 MHz
- Form factor: Slate
- Dimensions: 129 mm (5.1 in) H 65 mm (2.6 in) W 10.7 mm (0.42 in) D
- Weight: 120 g (4.2 oz)
- Operating system: Android 4.0.4 "Ice Cream Sandwich"; Android 4.3 "Jelly Bean" (some variants)
- System-on-chip: Qualcomm Snapdragon S4 MSM8960
- CPU: 1500 MHz dual-core Krait
- GPU: Adreno 225
- Memory: 1 GiB RAM
- Storage: 8 GiB
- Removable storage: 32 GiB, microSD or microSDHC
- Battery: 1750 mAh
- Rear camera: 13 megapixels back-side illuminated sensor LED flash Aperture f/2.4 1920×1080 (1080p); Auto focus Image stabilizer Face/smile detection Geo tagging High-dynamic-range mode (HDR); Panorama
- Front camera: 0.3 megapixels VGA
- Display: 4.3 in diagonal with 16:9 aspect ratio widescreen TFT 1280×720 (342 ppi) display 16M colors
- Connectivity: Bluetooth 4.0; USB 2.0; Wi-Fi (802.11 a/b/g/n); NFC; DLNA; MHL; USB tethering
- Data inputs: Multi-touch capacitive touchscreen Accelerometer; Gyroscope; Digital compass GPS; GLONASS
- Model: LT25i
- Codename: Tsubasa
- Other: Available in black, white and pink

The Sony Xperia V is a smartphone designed, developed and marketed by Sony Mobile. Presented initially on 29 August 2012 in Berlin, the Xperia V was released in December 2012 and belongs to Sony's handset line up of the second half of 2012, which includes the flagship Xperia T and the entry-level Xperia J. The 4.3-inch (110 mm) device employs a 1280×720 (720p) pixel resolution display, a 1.5 GHz dual-core processor and a 13-megapixel camera, and an interchangeable battery while protected by a water-resistant outer skin. This is the first Sony Mobile's device alongside the Xperia J that does not feature the Sony Ericsson's liquid energy logo.

== Availability ==
The device was officially announced by Sony on 29 August 2012 in Berlin along with the Xperia J and T. The device is water and dust resistant which is similar to the Xperia go and Xperia acro S. It was to be released during the fourth quarter of 2012. KDDI and Sony Mobile officially announced the localized Xperia VL SOL21 on October 17, 2012, followed by an initial market release in the Kanto and Okinawa regions on November 2, 2012, and expansion to remaining Japanese regions on November 9, 2012.

On December 14, 2012 the Xperia V was released in Russia. As of January 2015, Sony has run out of replacement batteries in Hong Kong and is no long producing them, meaning it is no longer supporting the Xperia V.

== Hardware ==
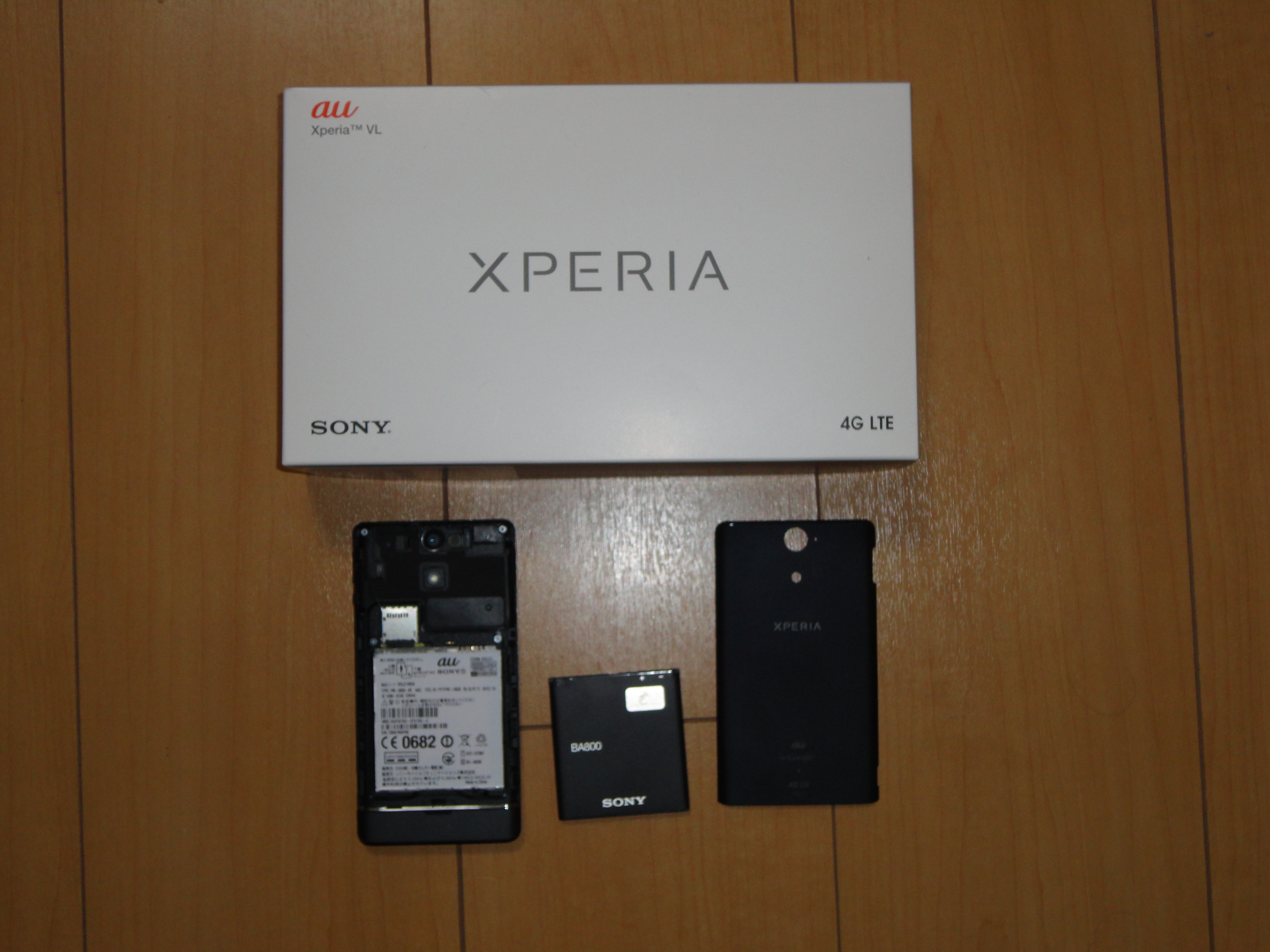
Xperia VL (Japan)

The phone has a capacitive touchscreen display that measures 4.3 inches with a resolution of 1280 x 720 pixels at 342 ppi equipped with Sony's Mobile BRAVIA Engine 2 which enhances the display of the device. It is capable of displaying 16,777,216 colours and supports multitouch. The camera of the device has 13 megapixels capable of 16 times digital zoom with Sony's Exmor R for low light capturing.

It is capable of video recording at 1080p HD and also video calling. The phone also features a VGA front-facing camera with 0.3 megapixels. The device has a 1.5 GHz Dual-core Qualcomm Snapdragon processor with 1 GiB RAM, internal storage of 8 GiB and an external slot for storage expansion up to 64 GiB.

The device is also NFC (Near Field Communication) enabled which can be used with Xperia SmartTags, or for low value financial transactions, as NFC becomes more widespread in use, with the appropriate applications from Google Play. The device also features a micro USB connector with USB on the Go support It also has a scratch-resistant and shatterproof glass. Despite being equipped with a user-replaceable battery, the Xperia V has a dust- (IP5X) and water-resistant (IPX5/7) rating, similar to the Sony Xperia acro S.

== Software ==
The phone was released with Sony's Android 4.0 Ice Cream Sandwich integrated with Facebook and the Entertainment Network, allowing users to access Music & Video Unlimited. Other than that, the device also has the Walkman music player with a manual equalizer and is DLNA certified.

The operating system can be upgraded to Android 4.3 "Jelly Bean" from 29 January (see bottom of page), with it being the final version and no Android version 4.4 KitKat being released for Xperia V.

Though Sony did not release any software updates after Jellybean 4.3, they have always been supporting of the open source nature of Android; as a result, there are lots of ROMs available. In 2017 it also received Lollipop-based ROMSs which include cyanogenmod ,paranoid android thanks to developers at XDA.

=== Known issues ===
Early firmware possessed an issue where the display failed to turn on when waking the device from sleep mode, requiring hardware service or a software patch released on November 28, 2012.

A corporate-oriented model in black was introduced in April 2013, and the device received a major Android 4.1 operating system upgrade on May 16, 2013. Although the OS update was temporarily suspended on June 21, 2013, due to firmware bugs, distribution was officially resumed on July 3, 2013.
