= Sony Xperia ZL2 =

Sony smartphone introduced in 2014

- Brand: Sony
- Manufacturer: Sony Mobile
- Type: Smartphone
- Series: Xperia
- First released: Japan: May 8, 2014
- Predecessor: Sony Xperia ZL; Sony Xperia UL (for au by KDDI)
- Successor: Sony Xperia Z3
- Related: Sony Xperia Z2; Sony Xperia Z1
- Compatible networks: GSM: 850/900/1800/1900 MHz
- Form factor: Slate
- Dimensions: 137 mm (5.4 in) H 72 mm (2.8 in) W 10.8 mm (0.43 in) D
- Weight: 167 g (5.9 oz)
- Operating system: Original: Android 4.4.2 "KitKat"; Current: Android 6.0.1 "Marshmallow"
- CPU: Qualcomm Snapdragon 801, MSM8974-AB, quad-core (2.26 GHz Krait 400)
- GPU: Adreno 330
- Memory: 3 GB LPDDR3
- Storage: 32 GB
- Removable storage: microSDXC (up to 128 GB)
- Battery: Non-removable Li-ion 3000 mAh
- Rear camera: Sony G Lens, 20.7 MP (Sony Exmor RS IMX220) with BIONZ™ for mobile, f/2.0, 27 mm (wide), 1/2.3", 1.12 µm, autofocus, LED flash, HDR; Video: 4K@30fps, 1080p@60fps, 720p@120fps
- Front camera: 2.2 MP; Video: 1080p@30fps
- Display: TFT LCD 5" (130 mm) 1080 x 1920, (1080p), 16:9, 441 ppi
- Connectivity: Wi-Fi 802.11 a/b/g/n/ac Bluetooth 4.0; A2DP; NFC; DLNA; GPS with A-GPS; GLONASS microUSB 2.0
- Data inputs: Multi-touch capacitive touchscreen
- Other: Accelerometer, gyroscope, digital compass, proximity sensor

The Sony Xperia ZL2 (model number SOL25, also known as the Sony Xperia Z2a) is a smartphone in the Sony Xperia series developed by Sony Mobile and introduced exclusively for the Japanese carrier au by KDDI in May 2014. The device is dust and waterproof with an IPX5/8 rating. Unlike its predecessor, the phone was not released outside of East Asia and is largely considered the successor to the Sony Xperia UL.

== Technical specifications ==
=== Hardware ===
The smartphone is powered by a quad-core Qualcomm Snapdragon 801 (MSM8974-AB) processor clocked at 2.26 GHz (ARMv7 architecture), with 3 GB of RAM and uses an Adreno 330 graphics processing unit for graphics processing. The device also features 32 GB of internal storage, expandable via a microSDXC card.

The device is equipped with a 5-inch (130 mm) display with a resolution of 1080 x 1920 pixels and a pixel density of 441 ppi, utilizing TFT technology. It supports multi-touch and includes display features such as Live Color LED for more saturated colors and uniform backlighting.

A 20.7-megapixel rear camera is built-in with an Exmor RS image sensor, capable of shooting 4K HDR video. The camera sensor size is 1/2.3 inches, the same as typically used in bridge cameras. It also features an LED flash, image stabilization, HDR, autofocus, sweep panorama, and a 2.2 megapixel front camera that records video at 1080p.

Data is transferred via a micro-USB connector and an HDMI port (via MHL 3.0) for viewing images and videos on a TV screen. Regarding wireless networking, it includes Wi-Fi (802.11 a/b/g/n/ac 5 GHz), DLNA, Bluetooth 4.0, a built-in GPS antenna with A-GPS + GLONASS, and NFC.

The entire device is powered by a 3000 mAh lithium-ion battery and weighs 167 grams.

=== Software ===
The Sony Xperia ZL2 originally launched with Android 4.4.2 "KitKat" featuring Sony's custom user interface and additional applications, including Sony media apps (Walkman, Album, and Movies). Additionally, the device features Stamina mode, which increases the phone's standby time by up to 4 times. Several Google apps (such as Google Chrome, Google Play, Google Search (with voice), Google Maps, and Google Hangouts) are pre-loaded. New features added to the software include "Smart Backlight"—which keeps the display on as long as the user is looking at it—and "Glove Mode." An update to Android 5.0.1 "Lollipop" was released for the smartphone.
