= Sony Xperia Ion =

Smartphone model by Sony

Sony Xperia ion
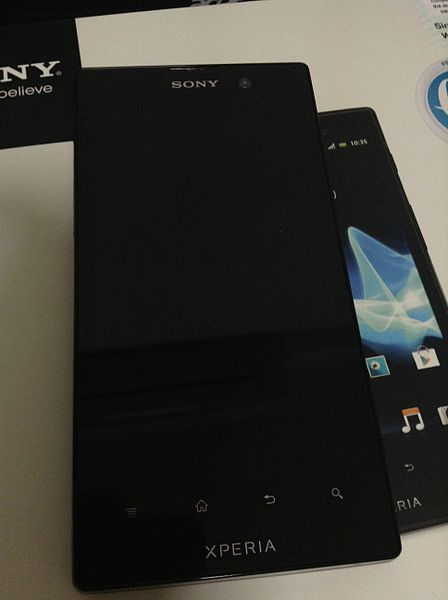
- Sony Xperia ion
- Manufacturer: Sony Mobile Communications
- Type: Smartphone
- Series: Sony Xperia
- First released: 2 March 2012; 14 years ago
- Predecessor: Sony Ericsson Xperia Arc S
- Successor: Sony Xperia T Sony Xperia TX
- Compatible networks: GSM/GPRS/EDGE 850/900/1800/1900, UMTS/HSPA/HSPA+ (LT28h) 850/900/1700/1900/2100, UMTS/HSPA/HSPA+ (LT28i); 850/1700/1900/2100, UMTS/HSPA/HSPA+ (LT28at); 850/1900/2100, LTE (LT28i/at); 700/1700 (Bands 17 and 4)
- Form factor: Slate
- Color: Black
- Dimensions: 132×68×10.6 mm (5.20×2.68×0.42 in)
- Weight: 144.0 g (5 oz)
- Operating system: Android 2.3.7 "Gingerbread", Upgradable to Android 4.1.2 "Jelly Bean"
- System-on-chip: Qualcomm Snapdragon S3 APQ8060
- CPU: 1.5 GHz dual-core Scorpion
- GPU: Qualcomm Adreno 220
- Memory: 1 GB RAM
- Removable storage: 16 GB internal, memory card support up to 32 GB
- Battery: 1900mAh internal battery
- Rear camera: 12.1 megapixels with 1080p video recording and 16× digital zoom
- Front camera: 1.3 megapixels HD 720p
- Display: 4.55 in (116 mm) TFT LCD; 720x1280 resolution (323 ppi); 16,777,216 colour
- Connectivity: micro-USB, HDMI 2.0, 3.5mm Audio Jack, Bluetooth 2.1, Wi-Fi 802.11b/g/n, aGPS, GLONASS, NFC, DLNA, USB on the go
- Data inputs: On-screen QWERTY keyboard
- Codename: Aoba
- Other: Sony Entertainment Networks – Music and Video Unlimited*

Sony Xperia Ion is an Android smartphone developed and manufactured by Sony Mobile Communications. It was launched at the 2012 Consumer Electronics Show with Sony Xperia S.

== Hardware ==
The device has a capacitive touchscreen display that measures 4.6 inches with a resolution of 1280 x 720 at 323 ppi with Sony's Mobile BRAVIA Engine reality display. The glass that the screen was made from is also scratch-resistant, and the screen supports multitouch which is also capable of displaying 16 million colours. The phone features a 12-megapixel camera capable of recording high-definition videos at 1080p at 30 fps with continuous autofocus, video light and video stabilizer. It also has a front-facing camera of 1.3 megapixels capable of recording 720p videos at 30fps. The device is equipped with a 1.5 GHz Dual-core Qualcomm Snapdragon processor with 1 GB RAM, 16 GB of internal memory, which also supports 32 GB external memory with NFC (Near Field Communication) enabled which can be used with Xperia SmartTags, or for low value financial transactions, as NFC becomes more widespread in use, with the appropriate applications from Google Play. The device also features a micro USB connector with USB on the Go support and a HDMI port for viewing photos and videos on a TV screen.

== Software ==
The Xperia ion for AT&T (LT28at) was released with Android 2.3.7 Gingerbread but it has received an update to Android 4.0.4 on 26 September 2012. The HSPA version (LT28h) came with Ice Cream Sandwich pre-installed while the LTE version came pre-installed with Gingerbread and then was updated to Ice Cream Sandwich. The Xperia ion is fully Facebook integrated with the Timescape UI with Twitter. The browser supports HTML, HTML5, XHTML, Flash and CSS 3. The phone is also integrated PlayStation Certified which allows users to play PlayStation Suite games, and is connected to the Sony Entertainment Network, allowing users to access Music & Video Unlimited. The device has WiFi and WiFi hotspot functionality with Bluetooth connectivity and is also DLNA certified. Sony Xperia ion received the upgrade Android 4.1 Jelly Bean on 26 June 2013.
