= Sony Xperia TX =

Smartphone model by Sony

Sony Xperia TX (LT29i)
- Brand: Sony
- Manufacturer: Sony Mobile Communications
- Type: Smartphone
- Series: Sony Xperia
- First released: 8 October 2012
- Predecessor: Sony Xperia S
- Successor: Sony Xperia Z
- Related: Sony Xperia GX SO-04D (Japan); Sony Xperia T Sony Xperia V
- Compatible networks: GSM 850/900/1800/1900; HSPA+ 850/900/1700/1900/2100
- Form factor: Slate
- Dimensions: 131 mm (5.16 in) H 68.6 mm (2.70 in) W 8.6 mm (0.34 in) D
- Weight: 127 g (4.48 oz)
- Operating system: Android 4.0.4 "Ice Cream Sandwich" upgradable to Android 4.3 "Jelly Bean"
- System-on-chip: Qualcomm Snapdragon S4 Plus MSM8260A
- CPU: 1.5 GHz dual-core Krait
- GPU: Adreno 225
- Memory: 1 GB RAM
- Storage: 16 GB
- Removable storage: 32 GB microSD
- Battery: 1750 mAh LiPo
- Rear camera: 13.0 MPx with f/2.4 aperture, 16× digital zoom, back-illuminated sensor Exmor R for mobile CMOS sensor, autofocus, face recognition, sweep panorama, geo-tagging, stabilizer, smile detection, touch focus, Video: 1080p @ 30fps, continuous autofocus, light, stabilizer.
- Front camera: 1.3 MPx; Video: 720p @ 30fps
- Display: 4.55-inch 720×1280 px WXGA "HD Reality Display" LED-backlit LCD at 323 PPI with Mobile BRAVIA Engine, 16M colors
- Connectivity: NFC; Bluetooth 3.1 with A2DP, EDR micro-USB 2.0; USB On-The-Go; 3.5 mm audio jack aGPS; Wi-Fi 802.11 a/b/g/n HDMI (MHL over micro USB)
- Data inputs: Touch-sensitive controls with multi-touch up to 10 fingers, capacitive touchscreen, accelerometer
- Codename: Hayabusa
- Other: Shatterproof sheet on scratch-resistant glass

Sony Xperia TX (also known as Sony LT29i) is an Android high-end smartphone from Sony Mobile Communications introduced on 29 August 2012, the Xperia TX is a version of the Sony Xperia GX SO-04D which was launched in May 2012, in Japan. It is Sony's first smartphone built on Qualcomm's Snapdragon S4 (MSM8260A) platform. The Xperia TX was officially released in October 2012 in three colors: Black, White and Pink.

== Design ==
Similar to the previous smartphones that Sony has released, the Sony Xperia TX has a curvy and inwards arching design with a plastic finish. On the back of the device, Sony Ericsson's liquid energy logo still can be seen with the Xperia branding. The device does not feature any physical navigation buttons as the buttons are integrated into the software.

== Specifications ==
=== Hardware ===
The Sony Xperia TX is very similar to the Xperia T. It shares a 4.55-inch high-definition display with 1280 by 720 pixels and a pixel density of 323 ppi with Sony's Mobile BRAVIA Engine. There is also a shatterproof sheet on the scratch-resistant glass which prevents the glass pieces of the display from falling out if it breaks. The camera has 13 megapixels with LED flash, Exmor R, 16 times digital zoom and HD (1080p) video recording, it also features a 1.3-megapixel front-facing camera capable of 720p for video recording. The device features Snapdragon S4 MSM8260A SoC with 1.5 GHz dual-core CPU, 1 GB of RAM, 16 GB of built in storage, a microSD expansion slot of up to 32 GB, HDMI via MHL support to connect to TVs. It is also equipped with NFC (near field communication) enabled which can be used with Xperia SmartTags, or for low value financial transactions, as NFC becomes more widespread in use, with the appropriate applications from Google Play.

The Xperia TX has HSPA+, while the LT30a adds in full LTE capabilities. The LT30at (sold as the Xperia TL) has a subset of LTE specifically for AT&T's network.

=== Software ===
The Sony Xperia TX was released with Android 4.0.4 Ice Cream Sandwich with Sony's custom launcher with some notable additions to the software which includes Sony's Media applications – Walkman, Album and Videos. The device comes with NFC which allows 'one touch' to mirror what is on the smartphone to compatible TVs or play music on a NFC wireless speaker. Additionally, the phone includes a battery stamina mode which increases the phone's standby time up to 4 times. Several Google applications (such as Google Chrome, Google Voice Search, Google Talk application, Google Mail and Google Maps with Street View and Latitude) already come preloaded.

The Android 4.1.2 Jelly Bean update for the Xperia TX was released on March 27, 2013.
The Android 4.3 Jelly Bean update for Xperia TX was released in February 2014.

== See also ==
Preceded by Sony Xperia S	Sony Xperia TX; 2012	Succeeded by Sony Xperia Z
