= Sony Xperia S =

2012 Android smartphone by Sony

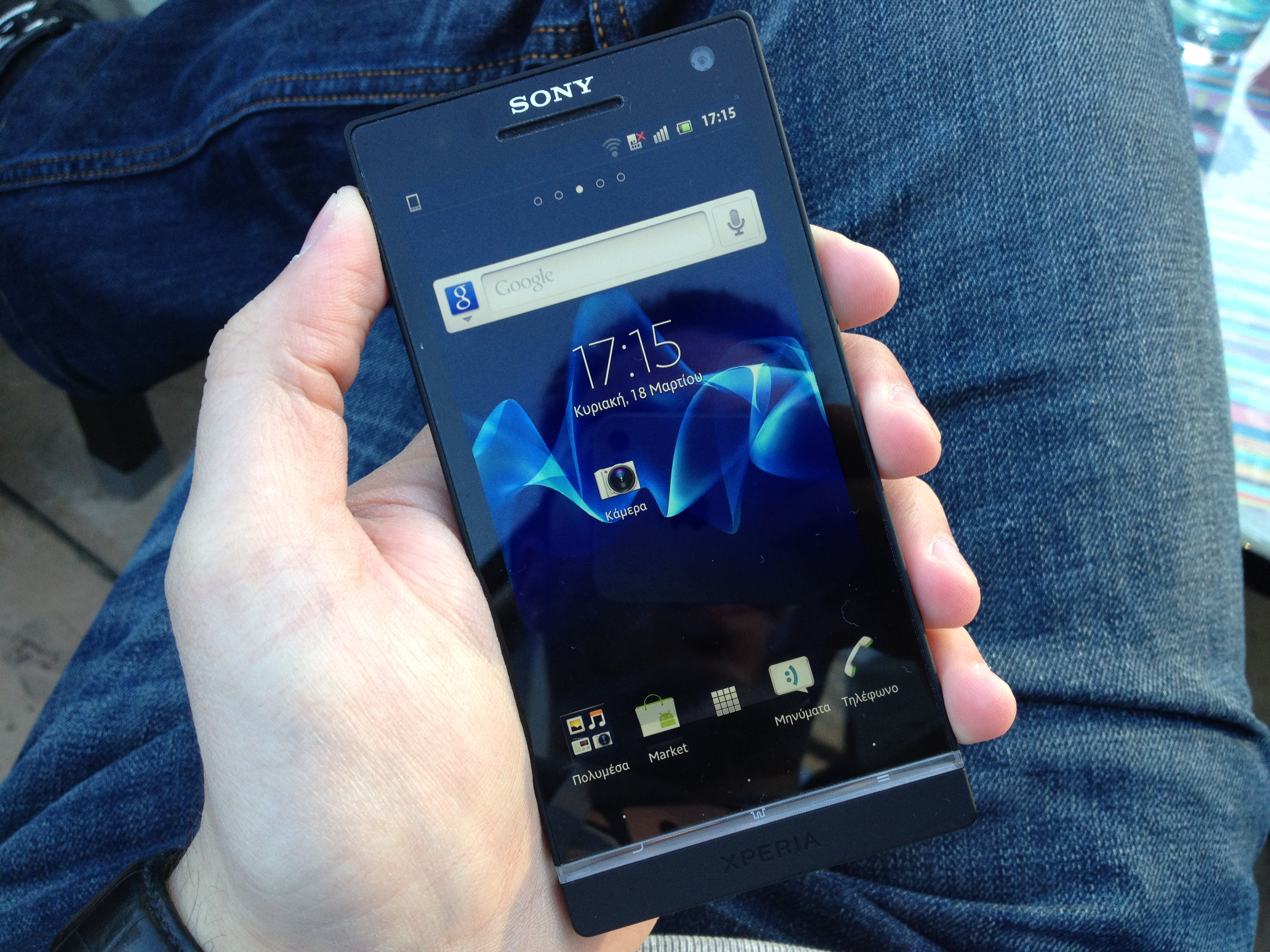
- Sony Xperia S running Android 2.3 (Gingerbread)
- Manufacturer: Sony Mobile Communications
- Type: Smartphone
- Series: Sony Xperia
- First released: 1 March 2012; 14 years ago
- Discontinued: September 2012
- Predecessor: Sony Ericsson Xperia arc S (global); Sony Ericsson Xperia acro (Japan)
- Successor: Sony Xperia T Sony Xperia TX
- Related: Sony Xperia ion Sony Xperia acro S
- Compatible networks: GSM/GPRS/EDGE 850/900/1800/1900, UMTS/HSPA 850/900/1900/2100
- Dimensions: 128×64×10.6 mm 5.0×2.5×0.4 inches
- Weight: 144.0 g (5.08 oz)
- Operating system: Android 2.3 ("Gingerbread") upgradeable to Android 4.1.2 ("Jelly Bean")
- System-on-chip: Qualcomm Snapdragon S3 MSM8260
- CPU: 1.5 GHz dual-core Scorpion
- GPU: Qualcomm Adreno 220
- Memory: 1 GB RAM
- Storage: 32 GB of internal storage
- Removable storage: none
- Battery: Non-replaceable 1750 mAh
- Rear camera: 12.0 Mpx with 1080p video recording and 16× digital zoom
- Front camera: 1.3 Mpx with 720p video recording
- Display: 4.3 in (110 mm) TFT LCD; 720×1280 resolution (342 ppi); 24-bit true color
- Connectivity: micro-USB, HDMI 2.0, 3.5 mm Audio Jack, Bluetooth 2.1, Wi-Fi 802.11 b/g/n, aGPS, GLONASS, NFC, DLNA, USB On-The-Go
- Data inputs: On-screen QWERTY keyboard
- Model: LT26i
- Codename: Nozomi
- Other: PlayStation Suite, Sony Entertainment Network (specifically, "Music Unlimited" and "Video Unlimited")

The Sony Xperia S is an Android-based smartphone developed by Sony launched at the 2012 Consumer Electronics Show. It is the first Sony-only branded smartphone since Sony acquired Ericsson's stake in Sony Ericsson in January 2012. The Xperia S has a 4.3 in (110 mm) touch-screen with the mobile BRAVIA engine which optimizes the picture, a 1.5 GHz dual core processor, a 12.0-megapixel rear camera, HDMI-out, 1 GB of RAM, and 32 GB of internal storage.

It was first released in February 24, 2012 by NTT Docomo as the Sony Ericsson Xperia NX (SO-02D) in Japan, featuring Japan's Docomo 3G terminal, while the Sony Xperia S was released in March 2012 as a restyled version of the Sony Ericsson Xperia NX in more than 160 countries.

== Availability ==
The handset has been available in Barcelona since 29 February 2012 after the Mobile World Congress, and in United Kingdom since March 2012 at a MSRP of 399 GBP or 449 EUR in France, in Singapore at $700, and in Malaysia at RM1899.

== Hardware ==
Display

The Xperia S capacitive touchscreen display features a 720p zero-air-gap display on a 4.3-inch chassis and at 342 ppi which, at release, was tied with the HTC Rezound for the highest pixel density in any mobile phone. It supports multi-touch and features High Definition Reality Display with mobile BRAVIA engine from Sony and is capable of displaying 16,777,216 colours.

Cameras

The rear camera has 12 megapixels with Exmor R for low light capturing and is capable of recording video at 1080p (Full High Definition) with stereo audio., both unveiled in 2012.

It also features a front-facing camera of 1.3 megapixels and is capable of recording video at 720p. With its Fast Capture feature, it allows you to take a photo instantly from sleep mode in just 1.5 seconds.

The device is equipped with a dedicated physical shutter button for capturing photos and speedily launching the camera.

Chipsets and connectivity

The device features a 1.5 GHz dual core processor, 1 GB RAM, 32 GB internal storage, a micro-USB connector that also supports USB On-The-Go and a micro HDMI port for viewing pictures and videos from the device on a TV screen. It is also equipped with NFC (Near Field Communication) enabled which can be used with Xperia SmartTags, or for low value financial transactions, as NFC becomes more widespread in use, with the appropriate applications from Google Play.

The Xperia S also come with a special nano coating that is not just dirt repellent but also UV Active. It is also report that the Xperia S come with a fast charging ability. Charge times will be reduced by half and a 10-minute charge is good enough to keep the phone going for an hour.

== Software ==
The Xperia S was released with Android 2.3 ("Gingerbread"), but received an update to Android 4.0.4 ("Ice Cream Sandwich") on 21 June in some countries or carriers. Sony has announced an update to Android Jelly Bean 4.1 for the Xperia S from the end of May 2013. The update to Android 4.1.2 Jelly Bean began to roll out on 30 May 2013. The update brought new features, such as improved entertainment and camera apps, improved battery life, improved app organisation and new personalisation options.

The Xperia S is Facebook integrated and features the Timescape UI. It is also PlayStation Certified which allows users to play PlayStation Suite games, and is connected to the Sony Entertainment Network, allowing users to access Music & Video Unlimited. The Xperia S is also DLNA certified.

You can make your device run on Android KitKat, Lollipop, Marshmallow, Nougat and Oreo by using custom roms.

== Design ==
The front of the Xperia S is almost 90% glass which appears all black when the screen is off and the back is curved slightly for comfort. The antenna is embedded in the transparent strip which cuts through the base of the device, the strip illuminates and indicates where the back, home, and menu buttons are placed.

A distictive feature is the "Floating Prism", which makes the body frame transparent and visible seen anything.

Unlike the competing Samsung Galaxy S3, the Xperia S is equipped with a dedicated physical camera shutter button which can also be used to quick-launch the camera.

The buttons themselves are implemented as touch-sensitive regions between the transparent strip and the screen, like on the Sony Xperia P. Under the transparent belt, there is an XPERIA inscribed on top.

Sony described this design approach as "Iconic Identity," claiming that it creates a simple, strong appearance that is easily recognizable as a Sony Xperia device.

== Reception ==
At launch, the Xperia S was praised for its hardware, its distinctive design, high-definition display, efficient camera and voice clarity but was criticized for its lack of removable storage and battery. Among Android smartphones, it competed with the Galaxy Nexus, HTC One X, LG Optimus 4X HD, and Samsung Galaxy S III. The 2012 June update to the newest Android version, 4.0 (Ice Cream Sandwich), was well received and added its own improvements.

Despite the Xperia S and the iPhone 4S sharing similar Exmor R camera sensors, Natasha Lomas of CNET UK preferred the iPhone 4S camera for its colours, exposure, focus and noise reduction, (some comments on Natasha's article criticised that the test was biased and unfair whilst others felt that the conclusion was justified), but for Basil Kronfli of recombu, the Xperia S was nearly tied with the HTC One X for the best camera, for its physical button and detailed picture quality, ahead of the Nokia N8, itself above the iPhone 4S.

Preceded by Sony Ericsson Xperia Arc S	Sony Xperia S Sony Ericsson Xperia NX; 2012	Succeeded by Sony Xperia T & Sony Xperia TX
