= Sony Xperia acro S =

Android smartphone

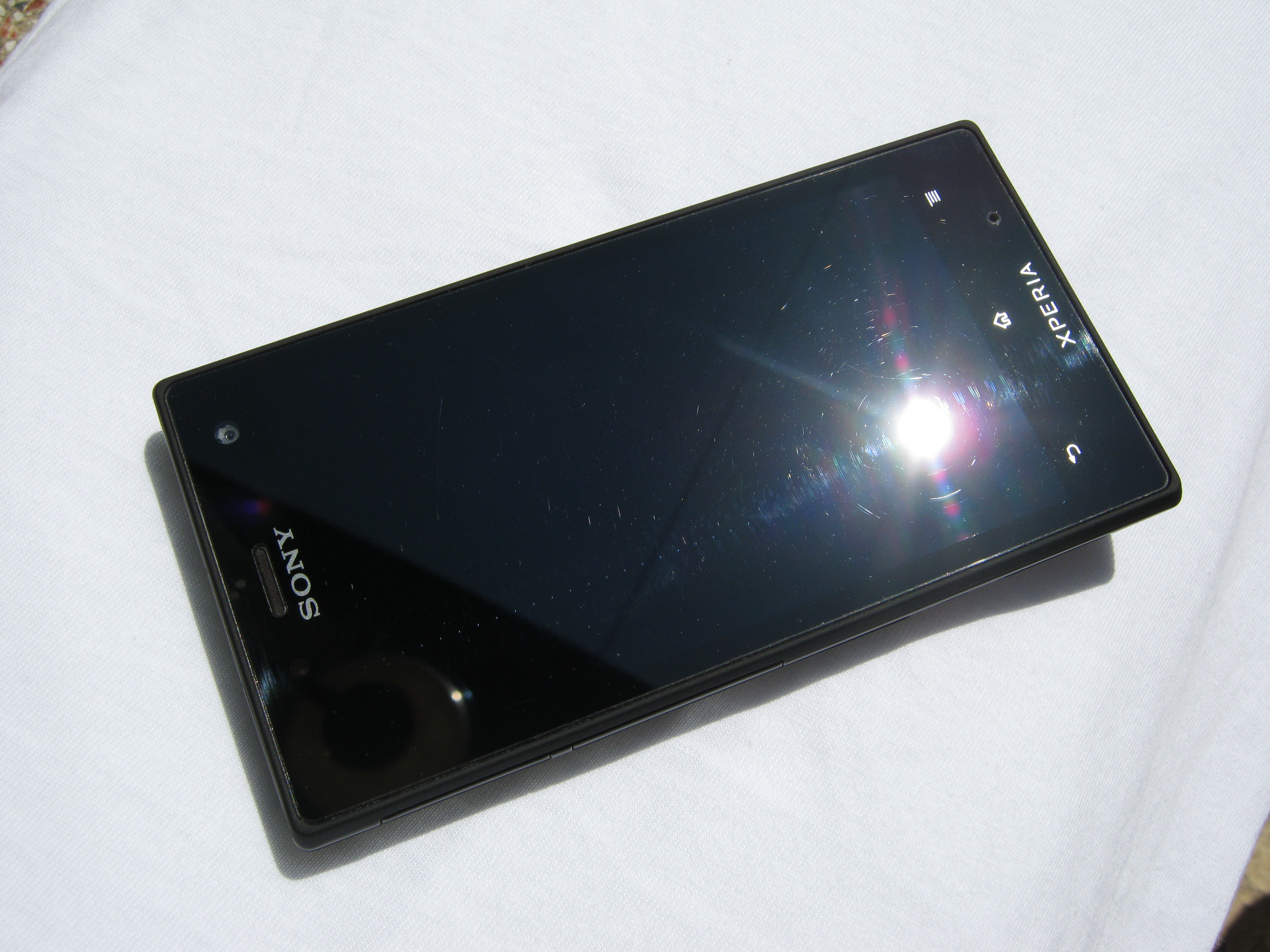
- Manufacturer: Sony Mobile Communications
- Type: Smartphone
- Series: Sony Xperia
- First released: 3rd quarter of 2012 (global release)
- Predecessor: Sony Ericsson Xperia acro
- Successor: Sony Xperia V
- Related: Xperia S, Xperia acro HD; Sony Xperia acro HD SO-03D (Japan); Sony Xperia acro HD IS12S (Japan)
- Form factor: Candy bar
- Colors: Pink, Black, White
- Dimensions: 126 mm × 66 mm × 11.9 mm (4.96 in × 2.60 in × 0.47 in)
- Weight: 147 g (5.2 oz)
- Operating system: Android 4.0 "Ice Cream Sandwich", upgradable to Android 4.1.2 "Jelly Bean"
- System-on-chip: Qualcomm Snapdragon S3 MSM8260 1.5 GHz
- CPU: 1.5 GHz dual-core Scorpion
- GPU: Adreno 220
- Memory: 1 GB RAM
- Removable storage: 16 GB internal, up to max 32 GB on microSD/HC card support
- Battery: Li-Po 1910 mAh (unremoveable)
- Rear camera: 12.1 megapixels with 1080p video recording and 16x digital zoom
- Front camera: 1.3 megapixels with 720p of video recording
- Display: 4.3 inch 1280x720 px "Reality Display" TFT LCD at 342 PPI with Mobile BRAVIA Engine
- Connectivity: microUSB, HDMI 2.0, 3.5 mm audio jack, Bluetooth 3.0 with A2DP, aGPS, GLONASS, Wi-Fi 802.11 b/g/n, ANT+, NFC
- Data inputs: Multi-touch capacitive touchscreen, Accelerometer, 3-Axis Gyroscope
- Other: Sony Entertainment Networks – Music and Video Unlimited*

The Sony Xperia acro S (known as the Sony Xperia acro HD in Japan) is a dust- and water-resistant Android smartphone produced and developed by Sony Mobile Communications.

== Hardware ==
The phone has a capacitive touchscreen display that measures 4.3 inches with a resolution of 1280 x 720 at 342 ppi with Sony's Mobile BRAVIA Engine reality display. It supports multitouch and is capable of displaying 16,777,216 colours. The camera has 12 megapixels with autofocus and also Exmor R for low-light capturing. It is capable of recording video at 1080p with continuous autofocus, video stabilizer and the phone also features a front-facing camera with 1.3 megapixels capable of recording video at 720p. The device features a 1.5 GHz dual-core Qualcomm Snapdragon processor with 1GB RAM, 16 GB of internal memory, which also supports 32 GB external memory with NFC (Near Field Communication) enabled which can be used with Xperia SmartTags, or for low-value financial transactions, as NFC becomes more widespread in use, with the appropriate applications from Google Play. The device also features a micro USB connector with USB on the Go support and a HDMI port for viewing photos and videos on a TV screen. As a dust- and water-resistant device, it is equipped with a scratch-resistant and shatterproof glass and with a dust- and water-resistant rating of IP57. The Acro S has a widely known problem of turning off and on at random.

== Software ==
The phone was released with Android 4.0 Ice Cream Sandwich and is Facebookintegrated with the Timescape UI skin added on top of Android. The browser supports HTML, HTML5, XHTML and CSS 3. The phone is also integrated with stereo FM radio with RDS, PlayStation Certified which allows users to play PlayStation Suite games, and is connected to the Sony Entertainment Network, allowing users to access Music & Video Unlimited. The device has WiFi and WiFi hotspot functionality with 4.0 Bluetooth connectivity and is also DLNA certified. Sony has made Android 4.1.2 Jelly Bean firmware available for users to download via Sony PC Companion.

== See also ==
- Xperia S
- Xperia acro
