= Toshiba CMOS image sensors =

Toshiba CMOS image sensors are semiconductor devices developed by Toshiba, a Japanese multinational electronics company. CMOS sensors are designed to capture and process visual information for a variety of applications. They are integral to digital imaging technologies, including those found in smartphone cameras, webcams, most modern digital compact cameras, and the majority of digital single-lens reflex (DSLR) cameras.

== List of Toshiba Tx sensors ==
This is a list of Toshiba's phone CMOS sensors.

Model number	Number of effective pixels	Sensor size (diagonal)	Unit cell size	Sensitivity (typical value f/5.6)	Sensor saturation signal (minimum value)	Output	Subpixel layout	Release date	Utilizing devices
T4K04	3280 × 2464 8 MP	8 mm (1/3.2")	1.4 μm²			CSI-2 4lanes	RGB		
T4K05	3280 × 2464 8 MP	6.4 mm (1/4")	1.12 μm²			CSI-2 4lanes	RGB		
T4K08	1280 × 720 0.9 MP	3.6 mm (1/7")	1.75 μm²			CSI-2 1lane	RGB		
T4K24	2016 × 1176 2.1 MP	5.8 mm (1/4.4")	1.75 μm²			CSI-2 1lane	RGB		
T4K28	1600 × 1200 2 MP	5.1 mm (1/5")	1.75 μm²			CSI-2 1lane	RGB		
T4K35	3280 × 2464 8 MP	6.4 mm (1/4")	1.12 μm²			CSI-2 4lanes	RGB		
T4K37	4208 × 3120 13 MP	8.3 mm (1/3.07")	1.12 μm²			CSI-2 4lanes	RGB		List: Asus ZenFone 2
T4K46	5216 x 3920 20 MP	7.66mm (1/2.3")	1.12 μm²			CSI-2 4lanes	RGB		
T4K71	1928 × 1088 2.1 MP	3.5 mm (1/7.3")	1.12 μm²			CSI-2 2lanes	RGB		
T4K82	4208 × 3120 13 MP	8.3 mm (1/3.07")	1.12 μm²			CSI-2 4lanes	RGB		
T4KA3	3280 × 2464 8 MP	6.4 mm (1/4")	1.12 μm²			CSI-2 4lanes	RGB		
T4KA7	5384 × 3752 20 MP	10.6 mm (1/2.4")	1.12 μm²			CSI-2 4lanes	RGB		List: HTC One M9; HTC Desire 10 Pro
T4KB3	4208 × 3120 13 MP	8.3 mm (1/3.07")	1.12 μm²			CSI-2 4lanes	RGB		
T8ES7	4016 × 3016 12 MP	12.7 mm (1/2")	1.75 μm²			CSI-2 2lanes	RGB		
T8ET5	2608 × 1960 5 MP	6.4 mm (1/4")	1.4 μm²			CSI-2 2lanes	RGB		
T8EV4	3280 × 2464 8 MP	7.9 mm (1/3.2")	1.4 μm²			CSI-2 2lanes	RGB		
T8EV5	2592 × 1944 5 MP	6.4 mm (1/4")	1.4 μm²			CSI-2 1lane	RGB		

== List of Toshiba TCM sensors ==
Model number	Number of effective pixels	Sensor size (diagonal)	Unit cell size	Sensitivity (typical value f/5.6)	Sensor saturation signal (minimum value)	Output	Subpixel layout	Release date	Utilizing devices
TCM3211PB	648 × 486 0.3 MP	6.4 mm (1/4")	5.6 μm²				RGB		
TCM3212GBA	648 × 486 0.3 MP	6.4 mm (1/4")	5.6 μm²				RGB		
TCM3221PBA	1376 × 1048 1.3 MP	6.4 mm (1/4")	2.8 μm²			CSI-2 2lanes	RGB		
TCM3232PBA	2008 × 1168 2.1 MP	8.5 mm (1/3")	2.7 μm²			CSI-2 2lanes	RGB		
TCM3232PB	2008 × 1168 2.1 MP	8.5 mm (1/3")	2.7 μm²			CSI-2 2lanes	RGB		

== See also ==
- Sony Exmor
- Sony HAD CCD
