= Sony Xperia Z series =

Android mobile phones and tablets

Sony Xperia series logo

Sony Xperia Z series is a former line of flagship Android smartphones and tablets in the Sony Xperia series manufactured by Sony Mobile from 2013 to 2016.

On February 25, 2016, Sony discontinued the Xperia Z series in favor of the Sony Xperia X series, but the device serving as the true successor of the Z5 is the Xperia XZ, Sony's flagship after the Xperia Z5 Premium.

== Models ==
=== Smartphones ===
==== Xperia Z ====
At the CES 2013 in Las Vegas, Sony announced the original Xperia Z. It is a smartphone with a 5-inch FHD screen size, 2GB of RAM, Quad Core processor and water and dust resistance, because of the last, many companies started to make phones with water and dust resistance including Samsung with the Samsung Galaxy S4 Active and their later model - the Samsung Galaxy S5. The Xperia Z won the ‘Best Smartphone' and ‘Best of Show' awards At CES 2013. According to a Sony executive, Mcdougall, early Xperia Z sales have been strong. He states, "It (the Xperia smartphone) sold over 150,000 units in its first week in Japan, taking a 24 percent market share straight away." "It may be a bit too early to say but the first signs are very positive."

==== Xperia ZR ====
First announced at CES 2013, Xperia ZR is a mid range smartphone with a 4.55 inch screen, 2GB of RAM, Quad core processor. The smartphone also has Ingress Protection Ratings of IP55 and IP58, making it dust protected, low pressure water jet protected, and waterproof. It was released on 17 May 2013 in Japan where it is marketed as the 'Xperia A'.

==== Xperia ZL ====
The Xperia ZL is a slightly changed variant of the Sony Xperia Z. The ZL compromises water and dust proofing for a thinner frame, an IR blaster, a dedicated camera button, slightly more battery capacity and a cheaper build.

==== Xperia Z1/Z1s ====
First announced at IFA 2013 in Berlin, the Sony Xperia Z1 is a high-end Android smartphone produced by Sony Mobile Communications AB. The Xperia Z1 is a dust resistance and waterproof phone with a rating of IP55 and 58. The main feature of the device is the 20.7 megapixels camera, paired with Sony's in-house G lens and its image processing algorithm called, BIONZ. Similar to its predecessor, the Sony Xperia Z, the phone features tempered glass covered by shatterproof film on front and back which is held together by a one piece aluminium frame. With Qualcomm's latest quad-core Snapdragon S800 processor clocked at 2.2Ghz and 2GB of RAM, it also contains a 5.0 inch Sony's Triluminos and its X-Reality Engine for better image and video viewing. Sony announced the Sony Xperia Z1s at CES 2014, a modified version of the Sony Xperia Z1 exclusive to T-Mobile US, was released in the United States.

==== Xperia Z1 Compact ====
First announced at CES 2014, the Xperia Z1 Compact is a smaller version of the 5-incher Xperia Z1 with a 4.3 inch HD 720p display. It does retain the same hardware as the Xperia Z1, such as the 20.7MP camera.

==== Xperia Z2 ====
First announced at MWC 2014, the Xperia Z2 continues the Xperia Z series with the latest Snapdragon 801 and enabled 4K video recording. It comes with latest Android Version (5.1.1 lollipop) with an optimized Xperia UI. Xperia Z2 has the same 20.7MP camera as Z1 and Z1 Compact. It has a much improved display now -Sony used IPS technology instead of TFT, which means that there is a very noticeable improvement in viewing angles and color accuracy.

==== Xperia Z3 ====
The Xperia Z3 was announced at the IFA 2014 in Berlin. As its predecessor, it will feature Snapdragon 801 and 4K video recording. The device has Remote Play, allowing users to play PlayStation 4 games. Unlike the Xperia Z2, it weighs 152g and has microSD support up to 128 GB – a 32 GB version is also available, with a new IP rating, IP65 and 68. The Xperia Z3 was released in September 2014.

The Xperia Z3 Dual, also known as Xperia Z3 D6633 has dual-SIM support.

==== Xperia Z3 Compact ====
Also announced at the IFA 2014 in Berlin, it comes with the same processor as the Xperia Z3. Unlike the Z1 Compact, its weight is 129g and has a 4.6" display. Its RAM has been reduced to 2GB from the 3GB of the Xperia Z3. Like its flagship, it has the same IP rating and was released in September 2014.

=== Phablets ===
==== Xperia Z Ultra ====
The Sony Xperia Z Ultra is the first phablet manufactured by Sony. The Xperia Z Ultra can be used to take notes or draw on with a regular pen or pencil. With a display of 6.44 inches, it has Sony's TRILUMINOS™ and X-Reality for mobile technology, with an OptiContrast panel to reduce reflection and enable clearer viewing even in bright sun lighting.

=== Tablets ===
==== Xperia Tablet Z ====
The Sony Xperia Tablet Z is a 10.1-inch tablet manufactured by Sony. First announced in Japan, the tablet was then announced globally in Barcelona at the Mobile World Congress on February 25, 2013. Weighing 1.09 pounds (495 grams) and just 0.27 inches (6.9 mm) thick, it is the thinnest and lightest 10-inch tablet in the world. Succeeding the Xperia Tablet S, the Xperia Tablet Z comes with a faster processor, a better front-facing camera, a higher-resolution screen, and Ingress Protection Ratings of IP55 and IP57, for dust-protected, water-jet protected, and waterproof in up to one meter of water for up to thirty minutes. The tablet was released in May 2013.

==== Xperia Z2 Tablet ====
The Sony Xperia Z2 Tablet was announced on February 24, 2014, as a successor to the Sony Xperia Tablet Z, featuring the same waterproof capabilities. It was the first tablet to run the 2.3 GHz Qualcomm Snapdragon 801 processor. Sony stated at the time of the unveiling that this tablet was the thinnest and lightest 10-inch tablet in the world. The release date was set to March 2014.

==== Xperia Z3 Tablet Compact ====
The Sony Xperia Z3 Compact Tablet was announced in September 2014. It comes with a 2.5 GHz Qualcomm Snapdragon 801 processor, as well as an 8.0" display. The tablet was scheduled to be released in October 2014.

==== Xperia Z4 Tablet ====
The Sony Xperia Z4 Tablet was announced on 2 March 2015. It comes with a 2 K resolution 10.0-inch screen and it is powered by Qualcomm Snapdragon 810 processor. The tablet was expected to be released in June 2015.

== Comparison ==
This table is primarily intended to show the differences between the model families of the Xperia Z series. The list only covers unlocked and international devices.

=== Phones ===
Code name	Market name	Release date	Android version	System on chip	RAM	Storage	Display	Weight	Battery (mAh)	Bluetooth	Wi-Fi	NFC	Camera	Network	Water and dust proof (IP)
Yuga	Sony Xperia Z	2013-02	4.1 / 4.2	1.5 GHz Qualcomm Snapdragon S4 Pro APQ8064, quad-core	2 GB	16 GB	5" FHD	146g	2330	4.0	802.11a/b/g/n, dual-band	Yes	Rear: 13.1 MP; Front: 2.2 MP	GSM / HSPA+ / LTE (Note: The C6603 variant of the Xperia Z is LTE capable, while the C6602 variant is not LTE capable.)	Yes (IP57)
Odin	Sony Xperia ZL	2013-04	4.1 / 4.2	1.5 GHz Qualcomm Snapdragon S4 Pro APQ8064, quad-core	2 GB	16 GB	5" FHD	151g	2370	4.0	802.11a/b/g/n, dual-band	Yes	Rear: 13 MP; Front: 2 MP	GSM / HSPA+ / LTE (Note: The C6503 & C6506 variants of the Xperia ZL are LTE capable, while the C6502 variant is not LTE capable.)	No
Dogo	Sony Xperia ZR; Xperia A	2013-05	4.1	1.5 GHz Qualcomm Snapdragon S4 Pro APQ8064, quad-core	2 GB	8 GB (ZR); 32 GB (A)	4.55" HD	138g	2300	4.0	802.11a/b/g/n, dual-band	Yes	Rear: 13 MP; Front: 0.3 MP	GSM / HSPA+ / LTE (Note: The C5503 variant of the Xperia ZR & the Xperia A are LTE capable, while the C5502 variant is not LTE capable.)	Yes (IP58)
Honami	Sony Xperia Z1	2013-10	4.2	2.2 GHz Qualcomm Snapdragon 800 8274, quad-core (non-LTE) (Note: The C6903, C6906 & C6943 variants of the Xperia Z1 are LTE capable, while the C6902 & L39h variants are not LTE capable.); 2.2 GHz Qualcomm Snapdragon 800 8974, quad-core (LTE)	2 GB	16 GB	5.0" FHD	170g	3000	4.0	802.11a/b/g/n/ac, dual-band	Yes	Rear: 20.7 MP; Front: 2 MP	GSM / HSPA+ / LTE	Yes (IP58)
Amami	Sony Xperia Z1 Compact	2014-02	4.3	2.2 GHz Qualcomm Snapdragon 800 8274, quad-core	2 GB	16 GB	4.3" HD IPS LCD	137g	2300	4.0	802.11a/b/g/n/ac, dual-band	Yes	Rear: 20.7 MP; Front: 2 MP	GSM / HSPA+ / LTE	Yes (IP58)
Sirius	Sony Xperia Z2	2014-03	4.4	2.3 GHz Qualcomm Snapdragon 801 8274, quad-core	3 GB	16 GB; External: supports up to 128 GB microSD/HC	5.2" FHD IPS LCD	158g	3200	4.0	802.11a/b/g/n/ac, dual-band	Yes	Rear: 20.7 MP; Front: 2.2 MP	GSM / HSPA+ / LTE	Yes (IP58)
Leo	Sony Xperia Z3	2014-09	4.4	2.5 GHz Qualcomm Snapdragon 801 8974, quad-core	3 GB	16 GB; External: supports up to 128 GB microSD/HC; 32 GB	5.2" FHD IPS LCD	152g	3100	4.0	802.11a/b/g/n/ac, dual-band	Yes	Rear: 20.7 MP; Front: 2.2 MP	GSM / HSPA+ / LTE	Yes (IP65 and 68)
Aries	Sony Xperia Z3 Compact	2014-09	4.4	2.5 GHz Qualcomm Snapdragon 801 8974, quad-core	2 GB	16 GB; External: supports up to 128 GB microSD/HC	4.6" HD	129g	2600	4.0	802.11a/b/g/n/ac, dual-band	Yes	Rear: 20.7 MP; Front: 2.2 MP	GSM / HSPA+ / LTE	Yes (IP65 and 68)
Ivy	Sony Xperia Z3+ (Sony Xperia Z4 in JAPAN)	2015-04	5.0	Quad-Core 1.5 GHz, Quad-Core 2.0 GHz Qualcomm Snapdragon 810 8994, Octa-Core	3 GB	32 GB External: supports up to 128 GB microSD / HC	5.2'' FHD IPS LCD	144g	2930	4.1	802.11a/b/g/n/ac, dual-band	Yes	Rear: 20.7 MP Front: 5.1 MP	GSM / HSPA+ / LTE	Yes (IP65 and IP68)
Sumire	Sony Xperia Z5	2015-10	5.1	Quad-core 2.0 GHz, Quad-core 1.5 GHz, Qualcomm Snapdragon 810 8994v2, Octa-Core	3 GB	32 GB External: supports up to 200 GB microSD / HC	5.2'' FHD IPS LCD	154g	2900	4.1	802.11a/b/g/n/ac, dual-band	Yes	Rear: 23 MP Front: 5.1 MP	GSM / HSPA+ / LTE	Yes (IP65 and IP68)
Satsuki	Sony Xperia Z5 Premium	2015-11	5.1	Quad-core 2.0 GHz, Quad-core 1.5 GHz, Qualcomm Snapdragon 810 8994v2, Octa-Core	3 GB	32 GB External: supports up to 256 GB microSD / HC	5.5 4KUHD IPS LCD	180g	3430	4.1	802.11a/b/g/n/ac, dual-band	Yes	Rear: 23 MP Front: 5.1 MP	GSM / HSPA+ / LTE	Yes (IP65 and IP68
Suzuran	Sony Xperia Z5 Compact	2015-10	5.1	2 GHz Qualcomm Snapdragon 810, octa-core	2 GB	32 GB; External: supports up to 200 GB microSD/HC	4.6" HD	138g	2700	4.1	802.11a/b/g/n/ac, dual-band	Yes	Rear: 23 MP; Front: 5 MP	GSM / HSPA+ / LTE	Yes (IP65 and IP68)

=== Phablets ===
Code name	Market name	Release date	Android version	System on chip	RAM	Storage	Display	Weight	Battery (mAh)	Bluetooth	Wi-Fi	NFC	Camera	Network	Water and dust proof (IP)
Togari	Sony Xperia Z Ultra	2013-09	4.4	2.2 GHz Qualcomm Snapdragon 800 8274, quad-core (non-LTE) (Note: The C6833 & C6806 variants of the Xperia Z Ultra are LTE capable, while the C6802 variant is not LTE capable.); 2.2 GHz Qualcomm Snapdragon 800 8974, quad-core (LTE)	2 GB	16 GB	6.44" FHD	212g	3050	4.0	802.11a/b/g/n/ac, dual-band	Yes	Rear: 8 MP; Front: 2 MP	GSM / HSPA+ / LTE	Yes (IP58)

=== Tablets ===
Code name	Market name	Release date	Android version	System on chip	RAM	Storage internal & (microSD)	Display	Weight	Battery (mAh)	Bluetooth	Wi-Fi	Camera	Water and dust proof (IP)
Pollux	Sony Xperia Tablet Z	2013-03	4.1	1.5 GHz Qualcomm Snapdragon S4 Pro APQ8064, quad-core	2 GB	16/32 GB	10.1" WUXGA	495g	6000	4.0	802.11b/g/n, dual-band	Rear: 8 MP; Front: 2 MP	Yes (IP57)
Castor	Sony Xperia Z2 Tablet	2014-03	4.4	2.3 GHz Qualcomm Snapdragon 801, quad-core	3 GB	16 GB (up to 64 GB)	10.1" WUXGA IPS LCD	439g	6000	4.0	802.11b/g/n/ac, dual-band	Rear: 8.1 MP; Front: 2.2 MP	Yes (IP55 and 58)
Scorpion	Sony Xperia Z3 Tablet Compact	2014-10	4.4	2.5 GHz Qualcomm Snapdragon 801 8974, quad-core	3 GB	16 GB (up to 128 GB)	8" WUXGA IPS LCD	270g	4500	4.0	802.11b/g/n, dual-band	Rear: 8.1 MP; Front: 2.2 MP	Yes (IP65 and 68)
Karin	Sony Xperia Z4 Tablet	2015-03	5.0	2.0 GHz Qualcomm Snapdragon 810 8974, Octa-core 64 bit	3 GB	32 GB (up to 128 GB)	10.1"	389g (Wi-Fi)/ 393g (LTE)	6000	4.1	802.11b/g/n, dual-band	Rear: 8.1 MP; Front: 5.1 MP	Yes (IP65 and 68)

== See also ==
- Sony Xperia
- Sony Xperia 1 series
