= Sony Xperia Z1 =

Android smartphone produced by Sony

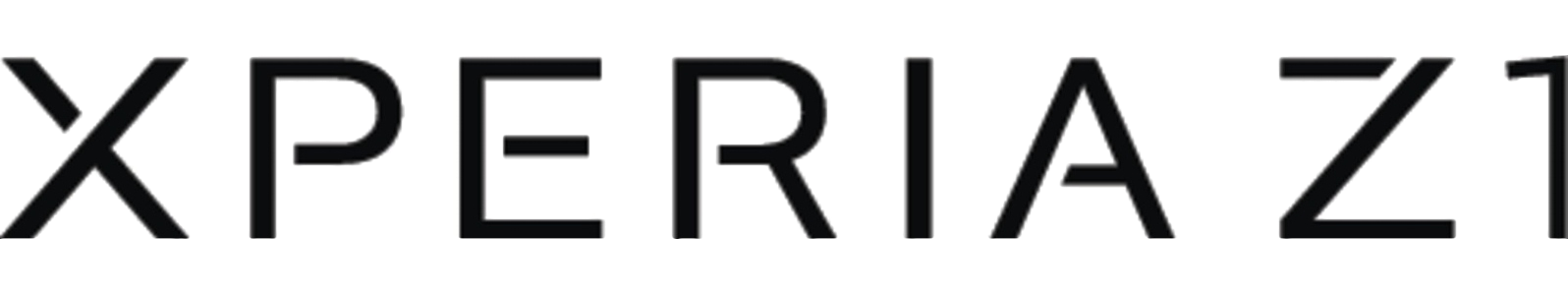

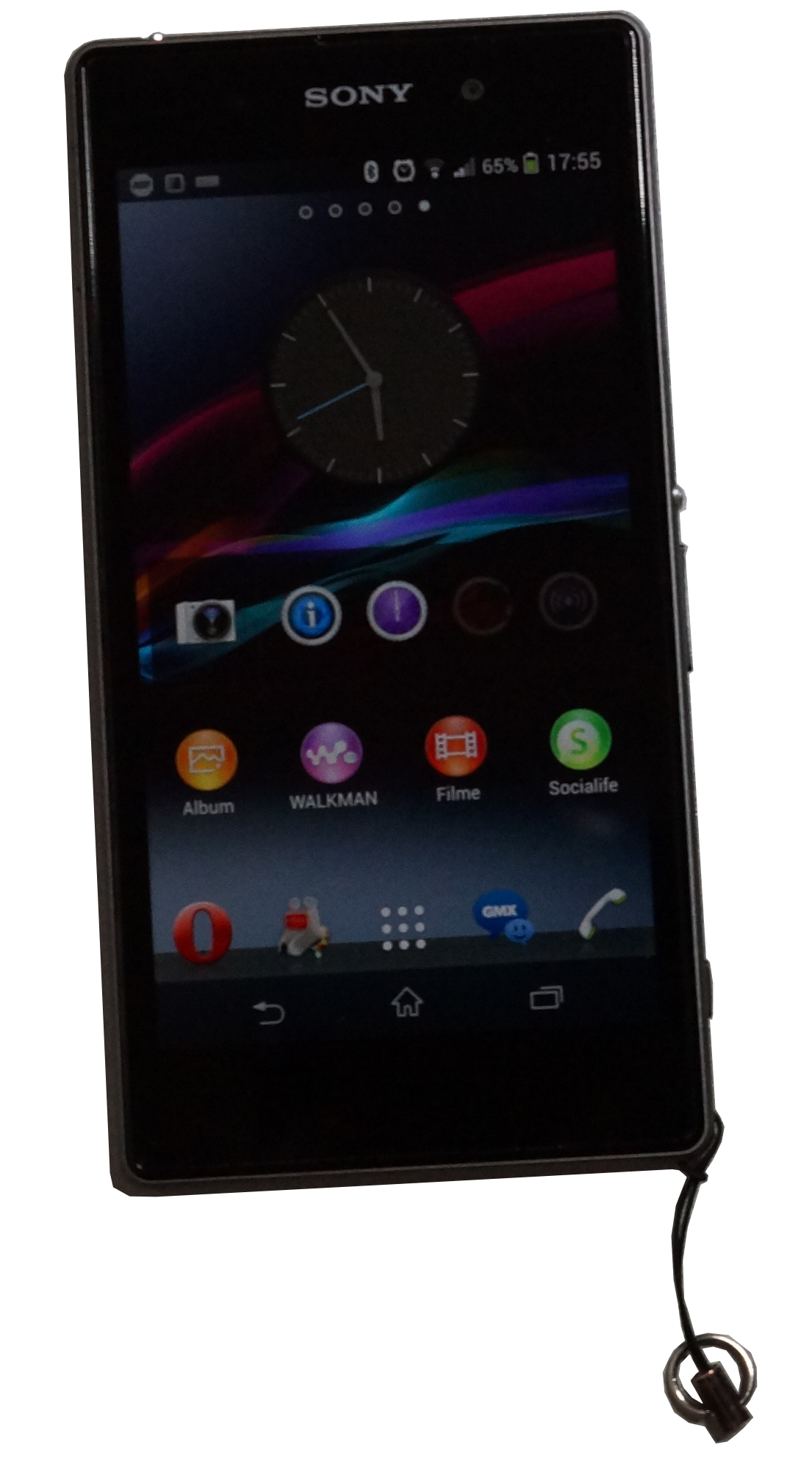
- Sony Xperia Z1
- Brand: Sony
- Manufacturer: Sony Mobile Communications
- Type: Touchscreen smartphone
- Series: Sony Xperia
- First released: 15 September 2013; 13 years ago
- Availability by region: 15 September 2013; 13 years ago (China, L39t variant) 20 September 2013; 13 years ago (UK) 30 September 2013; 13 years ago (Finland) 4 October 2013; 13 years ago (Asia) 15 October 2013; 13 years ago (Canada) 23 October 2013; 13 years ago (Japan, SOL23 variant exclusively for au by KDDI) 24 October 2013; 13 years ago (Japan, SO-01F variant exclusively for NTT DoCoMo) 13 January 2014; 12 years ago (USA, Z1s variant exclusively for T-Mobile US)
- Predecessor: Sony Xperia Z
- Successor: Sony Xperia Z2
- Related: Sony Xperia Z1 Compact; Sony Xperia Z Ultra; Sony Xperia Z1 SOL23 (Japan); Sony Xperia Z1 SO-01F (Japan); Sony Xperia Z1 f (Japan)
- Form factor: Slate
- Dimensions: 144 mm (5.7 in) H 74 mm (2.9 in) W 8.5 mm (0.33 in) D
- Weight: 170 g (6.0 oz)
- Operating system: Android 4.2.2 Jelly Bean (launch); Android 4.3 Jelly Bean; Android 4.4.2 KitKat (last version for SO-01F, SOL23); Android 4.4.4 KitKat; Android 5.0.2 Lollipop; Android 5.1.1 Lollipop (current)
- System-on-chip: Qualcomm Snapdragon 800
- CPU: 2.2 GHz quad-core Krait (2.2 GHz Qualcomm MSM8974 Quad Core)
- GPU: Adreno 330
- Memory: 2 GB RAM
- Storage: 16 GB (C6902/L39h, C6903, C6906, C6943); 32 GB (C6916, L39t, SOL23, SO-01F)
- Removable storage: up to 64 GB microSDXC
- Battery: non-user removable Li-ion 3000 mAh
- Rear camera: Sony G Lens 20.7 MP 1/2.3" Exmor RS IMX220 back-side illuminated sensor with BIONZ™ Engine for mobile image processor and LED flash 1080p video recording @ 30 frames/s 720p video recording @ 30 frames/s VIA root access 2160p video recording @ 30 frames/s 1080p video recording @ 60 frames/s (Exclusive to Android 5.0.2); 720p video recording @ 120 frames/s
- Front camera: 2 MP (1080p video recording)
- Display: 5 in (130 mm) Full HD TRILUMINOS™ Display with X-Reality™ Engine for Mobile (16,777,216 colours), 1920x1080 px (441 ppi)
- Connectivity: Wi-Fi DLNA; GPS/GLONASS; NFC; Bluetooth 4.0; Wireless Charging; MHL 2.0; USB 2.0 (Micro-B port, USB charging); USB OTG; FM-radio; ANT+ IR Blaster (SO-01F and SOL23 variants only)
- Data inputs: Multi-touch, capacitive touchscreen, proximity sensor, Gyroscope sensor, Compass sensor
- Model: C6902/L39h, C6903, C6906, C6916 (Z1s), C6943, L39t, SO-01F, SOL23
- Codename: Honami
- Other: Available in black, purple and white IP55 / IP58 (Dust protected, Water jet protected & Waterproof); PlayStation App; TrackID; 1seg (C6943, SO-01F and SOL23 variants only); Osaifu-Keitai (SO-01F and SOL23 variants only); LISMO (SOL23 variant only); NOTTV (SO-01F variant only); POBox Touch 6.2 (SO-01F and SOL23 variants only)
- Website: Official website

The Sony Xperia Z1 is an Android smartphone produced by Sony. The Z1, at that point known by the project code name "Honami", was unveiled during a press conference in IFA 2013 on 4 September 2013. The phone was released in China on 15 September 2013, in the UK on 20 September 2013, and entered more markets in October 2013. On 13 January 2014, the Sony Xperia Z1s, a modified version of the Sony Xperia Z1 exclusive to T-Mobile US, was released in the United States.

Like its predecessor, the Sony Xperia Z, the Xperia Z1 is water and dust-resistant, having an IP rating of IP55 and IP58. The key highlight of the Z1 is the 20.7 megapixel camera, paired with Sony's in-house G lens and its image processing algorithm called BIONZ. The phone also comes with Sony's new camera user interface, dedicated shutter button and has an aluminium and glass unibody design.

== Specifications ==
=== Hardware ===
The Sony Xperia Z1's design is "Omni-Balance", according to Sony, which is focused on creating balance and symmetry in all directions. Xperia Z1 has subtly rounded edges and smooth, reflective surfaces on all sides, which are held together by a skeleton frame made from aluminium. The phone features tempered glass, which is Sony's own, and they claim is even tougher than Gorilla Glass, front and back, covered by shatterproof film on front and back. The aluminium power button is placed on the right side of the device. A dedicated hardware shutter key for easy access to the camera is provided on the lower right side. The location is said to make operation easier. The metallic look and positioning of the power button is inspired by luxury watch crown design. Easy access to external memory card and sim card slots are provided. The sim card can be removed easily with bare hands. The phone is available in three colours: black, white, and purple. The Xperia Z1 is thicker (8.5 mm) and heavier (169 g) and has thicker screen bezels than the Xperia Z, even though the two phones share the same screen size. Sony said that the frame had to be enlarged due to the larger than average camera sensor. The camera sensor size is 1/2.3" same as commonly are used in bridge camera. The phone is certified waterproof to 1.5 m for up to 30 minutes. The Z1 is dust resistant with an IP rating of 55 and 58. Unlike the Xperia Z, the Xperia Z1 doesn't have a flap covering its headphone jack, but maintains its waterproofing, a move welcomed by many due to the waterproofing warranty on the Sony Xperia Z being reliant on all ports being sealed. Additional less obvious connectivity includes support for USB OTG allowing for the connection of external USB devices as well as support for MHL output connection. The Xperia Z1 comes with 2 GB of RAM and Qualcomm's quad-core Snapdragon 800 processor clocked at 2.15 GHz. It also contains a 5.0-inch Sony Triluminos and its X-Reality Engine for better image and video viewing, the display's resolution is 1920×1080 with 441 pixels per inch. The Sony Xperia Z1 has a 3000mAh battery.

=== Software ===
The Xperia Z1 was initially shipped with Android 4.2 (Jelly Bean) with Sony's custom launcher on top. Some notable additions to the software include Sony's Media applications – Walkman, Album and Videos. NFC is also a core feature of the device, allowing 'one touch' to mirror what is on the smartphone to compatible TVs or play music on a NFC wireless speaker. Additionally, the device includes a battery stamina mode which increases the phone's standby time up to 4 times. Several Google applications (such as Google Chrome, Google Play, Google search (with voice), Google Maps and Google Talk) already come preloaded. Sony also radically changed its camera user-interface; it added new features, such as TimeShift and Augmented reality (AR) effects such as a walking dinosaur.

As of firmware update .290 the bootloader can officially be unlocked without losing camera functionality.

On 28 January 2014 Sony began the roll-out of firmware update .136, in addition to bug fixes Sony included the White Balance feature which allows the user to customize the white balance of their display.

On 7 November 2013, Sony Mobile announced via their blog that the Xperia Z1 would receive the Android 4.3 (Jelly Bean) update in December. It also announced that the Android 4.4 update will eventually be released for the Xperia Z1.

On 19 March 2014, the Xperia Z1 received the Android 4.4.2 (KitKat) update.

On 27 June 2014, the Xperia Z1 received the Android 4.4.4 (KitKat) update, which corrected various bugs introduced in the previous Android 4.4.2 update.

On 18 November 2014, the Xperia Z1 (And other Xperia devices) got an update that removed the "What's new" application when swiping up, because of user complaints.

On 15 April 2015, Sony Mobile officially released the Android 5.0.2 Lollipop update for the Xperia Z1, starting with build number 14.5.A.0.242. The PlayStation App on the Xperia Z1 came preinstalled on the Lollipop update, whereas it was previously not preinstalled on earlier Jelly Bean and KitKat updates.

In September 2015, Sony Mobile officially released the Android 5.1.1 Lollipop update for the Xperia Z1, starting with build number 14.6.A.0.368.

On 5 November 2015, Sony Mobile officially released another update to newly released Android 5.1.1 Lollipop for the Xperia Z1, bearing the build number 14.6.A.1.216.

On 4 December 2015, Sony Mobile released another small bug-fixing update for the Xperia Z1 models with build number 14.6.A.1.236. Initial reports suggest few noticeable changes over the previous build (14.6.A.1.216).

== Features ==
=== Camera ===
Xperia Z1 camera modes

With a focus on camera, Xperia Z1 also introduces many new camera modes and apps.

- Social live, developed in cooperation with Bambuser, allows users to broadcast their video live via Facebook and receive comments from their friends in real time.
- Info-eye instantly gives information about the objects captured by Xperia Z1's camera.
- Timeshift-burst captures 61 frames within 2 seconds, starting before the shutter button is pressed, allowing users to select the best picture. But shooting in 1080p resolution.
- AR Effect switches camera to augmented reality effect mode and adds some fun animations to pictures.
- Creative Effect gives options for various photographic toning effects.
- Sweep Panorama takes panoramic views of almost 270 degrees viewing perspective.
- AR Fun (Added in recent update) allows user to fire projectiles at targets using augmented reality effect. (Not shown)
- Time Lapse (Added in recent update) allows user to make a time-lapse video, with extensive settings. (Not shown)
- Background defocus (Added in recent update) allows user to make a DSLR-like picture with background blur. (Not shown)

Although featuring similar CPU and GPU chipsets as used in the Samsung Galaxy Note 3 that supports 4K@30fps and 1080p@60fps video recording, the Xperia Z1's video recording is capped at 1080p@30fps. However, this limitation can be bypassed by applying custom third-party modifications to the device.

A gimmick in the Z1's camera software is the "Clear image zoom" feature within the “Superior Auto” mode, which is a simple lossless digital zoom enabled by a lower (8 megapixel) resolution setting on a 20 megapixel sensor.

=== Remote-controllable ===
The phone is capable of being fully remote-controlled from a computer through the free TeamViewer QuickSupport app.

== Variants ==
Model	FCC id	Carriers/regions	GSM bands	UMTS bands	LTE bands	Notes
C6902/L39h	PY7PM-0500	Worldwide	Quad	Penta	N/A	This model contains the MSM8274 chipset instead of the MSM8974
C6903	PY7PM-0450	Worldwide	Quad	Penta	1, 2, 3, 4, 5, 7, 8, 20	
C6906	PY7PM-0460	North America	Quad	Penta	1, 2, 4, 5, 7, 8, 17	
C6916 (Z1s)	PY7PM-0590	T-Mobile US (USA)	Quad	Penta	4, 17	This model has a plastic edge as request from T-Mobile to boost LTE speeds and reception. The notification LED is moved from the earpiece to a small hole next to the front light sensor. The rear Sony logo is replaced with "Xperia" and the Xperia logo is replaced with T-Mobile branding. A front and rear plastic film is pre-applied to prevent scratches on the glass. The Z1s is only available in black, and 32GB internal storage. It is also noted that the headphone jack has been moved along the top edge.
C6943	PY7PM-0650	Brazil	Quad	Penta	1, 2, 3, 4, 5, 7, 8, 20	This model is identical to C6903 but also supports ISDB-T International in Brazil
SOL23	PY7PM-0470	au by KDDI (Japan)	Quad	1, 2, 4, 5	1, 3, 11, 18	
SO-01F	PY7PM-0440	NTT DoCoMo (Japan)	Quad	1, 5, 6, 19	1, 3, 19, 21	
L39t		China	Quad	domestic TD-SCDMA: 34, 39 roaming only UMTS: 1, 2, 5	domestic: 38, 39, 40, 41 roaming only: 3, 7	

All variants support four 2G GSM bands 850/900/1800/1900 and five 3G UMTS band 850/900/1700/1900/2100 (except SO-01F model).

== Reception ==
A CNET.co.uk review liked the sleek, waterproof design, powerful core and sharp, bright screen. A Wired review by Dave Oliver thought the phone felt heavy but liked the screen, sharp image and covered expansion slot covers.

== See also ==
- Sony Xperia Z series

Preceded by Sony Xperia Z	Sony Xperia Z1; 2013	Succeeded by Sony Xperia Z2
