= Exmor =

Digital camera technology

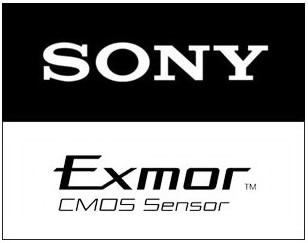
Sony Exmor Logo

Exmor is a series of CMOS image sensors developed by Sony, with integrated on-chip analog/digital signal conversion and noise reduction. Exmor sensors can be seen in consumer digital cameras and mobile phones.

== History ==
Sony Semiconductor Solutions was established in 2015 to specialize in developing CMOS image sensors.

The 2020 Intelligent Vision Sensor series features a processor and DRAM stacked vertically behind the image sensor. The first sensor of the series is the IMX500 and 501.

The IMX989 is Sony's first 1-inch camera sensor designed for smartphones. It was used in Sharp Aquos R7 and Xiaomi 12S Ultra smartphones.

== Versions ==
=== Exmor R ===
Exmor R is a back-illuminated version of Sony's CMOS image sensor. Exmor R was announced by Sony on 11 June 2008 and was the world's first mass-produced implementation of the back-illuminated sensor technology. Sony claims that Exmor R is approximately twice as sensitive as a normal front illuminated sensor.

This active pixel sensor is found in several Sony mobile phones and cameras as well as Apple's iPhone 4s and 5. Originally, Exmor R was limited to smaller sensors for camcorders, compact cameras and mobile phones, but the Sony ILCE-7RM2 full-frame camera introduced on the 10 June 2015 features an Exmor R sensor as well.

=== Exmor RS ===
Exmor RS was announced on 20 August 2012 and is the world's first stacked CMOS image sensor. Subsequently, Sony announced the first 3-layer stacked CMOS sensor, which added DRAM cell array in the middle.

From the Exmor RS line, IMX582 or IMX586 sensors are widely implemented as 48 megapixel smartphone cameras (e.g. Samsung Galaxy S20), with the sensors having almost identical specifications, but for the IMX586 supporting faster frame rates at 4K. In early 2020, the IMX586 was followed by the IMX686, enlarging the format to 1/1.72" (increasing resolution to 64 megapixels), but keeping the same pixel size. Pixel binning is used to reduce the high sensor resolution to standard photographic resolutions such as 4K, overcoming some of the traditional limitations of Bayer filtering.

=== STARVIS ===
STARVIS is a series of sensors with the Exmor RS family. It features high pixel sensitivity, making it suitable for low light applications. Industrial versions are finding applications in ambient-light surveillance systems. Commercial versions are finding applications in prosumer webcams with 4K HDR support, based on single exposure.

==== STARVIS 2 ====
From the second-generation STARVIS line (STARVIS 2), the IMX585 was announced on 29 June 2021, featuring a large image sensor format of 1/1.2", making it suitable for low light photography. Sony designed the STARVIS 2 sensor family for AI face recognition in surveillance applications with difficult lighting conditions. The sensor's high dynamic range assists with this task. It became available in a Razer Inc. prosumer webcam in January 2023. Larger sensor form factors decrease depth of field, which is often desired for teleconferencing webcams. Sony claims near DSLR quality for some applications.

==== Exmor T ====
Sony introduced the Exmor T with the Xperia 1 V smartphone on 10 May 2023.

==== LYTIA ====
On 7 November 2022, Sony announced their LYTIA brand of CMOS image sensors for mobile devices.

== See also ==
- Bionz – image processors used in Sony digital cameras
- Expeed – Nikon's counterpart for Bionz
- Canon DIGIC
- Charge-couped device (CCD), another type of image sensor circuit
- ISOCELL, image sensors manufactured by Samsung
- OmniVision, image sensors manufacturer
- Toshiba CMOS
