= List of devices using Qualcomm Snapdragon systems on chips =

Qualcomm Snapdragon
General information
- Launched: 2007; 19 years ago
- Designed by: Qualcomm

Physical specifications
- Cores: 1, 2, 4, 6, or 8

Architecture and classification
- Application: Mobile SoC and 1-in-1 PC
- Microarchitecture: ARM11, Cortex-A, Cortex-X1, Cortex-X2, Cortex-X3, Cortex-X4, Scorpion, Krait, Kryo
- Instruction set: ARMv6, ARMv7-A, ARMv8-A, ARMv9-A

This is a list of devices using Qualcomm Snapdragon systems on chips (SoC) made by Qualcomm for use in smartphones, tablets, laptops and 2-in-1 PCs.

== Snapdragon S1 ==
| Model number | Sampling availability | Devices |
|---|---|---|
| MSM7225 | 2007 | HTC Tattoo, Wildfire, Huawei U8110, IDEOS X2 U8500/Evolución UM840, Vodafone 858 Smart |
| MSM7625 | 2007 | HTC Wildfire A315c, Wildfire 6225, Huawei IDEOS C8150/U8150, M835, Ascend M860 |
| MSM7227 | 2008 | 600 MHz Alcatel OT-908 (T-Mobile Move), OT-980, OT-990, Coolpad W706, Garmin & Asus A10, M10, Gigabyte GSmart G1305 Boston, HighScreen Cosmo, HTC Aria, Gratia, HD mini, Legend, Wildfire S, Huawei Ideos X3, Pocket WiFi S II (S41HW), Sonic (U8650), LG GT540 Optimus, GD880 Mini, Optimus Chat (L-04C), Optimus Chic, Optimus Me, Optimus One (GSM), Micromax A70, Movi M1, Nexian A890 Journey, OlivePad VT-100, Optimus Boston, Palm Pixi (GSM), Samsung Galaxy 5 i5500 (Europa), Galaxy Fit, Galaxy Mini, i5510 Galaxy 551, Sony Ericsson Aspen (M1i), Xperia X8, Xperia X10 Mini, Xperia X10 Mini Pro, T-Mobile myTouch 3G Slide, ViewSonic ViewPad 7, WellCom A88, ZTE Blade, Racer, Merit (990G) 800 MHz Coolpad 7260, Huawei Smart Bar (S42HW), HTC ChaCha, Salsa, LG Optimus Hub, Optimus Net (P699), Motorola XT502, Odys Space, Samsung S5830 Galaxy Ace, Galaxy Gio, ZTE Blade S, N762, Skate |
| MSM7627 | 2008 | BlackBerry Curve (8530), Coolpad 5820, Huawei Evolución 2 CM980, Ascend II (M865C), Kyocera Zio, LG Optimus S, Optimus Q (L45C), LG Optimus V, Optimus Zip (L75C), VS740, Motorola Devour, ES400, Ouku Horizon P801W, Palm Pixi Plus, Samsung Galaxy Prevail, Galaxy Precedent (SCH-M828C), Galaxy Y (SCH-i509) (CDMA), Unimax MaxBravo (U670C), ZTE Score x500 |
| MSM7225A | Q4 2011 | 600 MHz HTC Desire C (GSM), Explorer, Motorola Defy Mini XT320 800 MHz Gigabyte GSmart G1342, Huawei Ascend Y100 (U8185), Ascend Y101 (U8186), Ascend Y200 (U8655), Ascend Y201 Pro, LG Optimus L3, Optimus L3 II, Optimus L5, Optimus Logic (L35G), Optimus Extreme (L40G), S-Nexian Mi320, Samsung Galaxy Discover (SCH-R740C, SGH-S730G), Sony Xperia miro, Xperia tipo, ZTE Illustra (Z778G), Whirl (Z660G) |
| MSM7625A | Q4 2011 | Hisense E860, Huawei Ascend Y (H866C), LG Optimus Dynamic (L38C), Karbonn A5, Samsung Galaxy Centura (SCH-S738C), Galaxy Discover (SCH-S735C), ZTE N855D, Valet (Z665C) |
| MSM7227A | Q4 2011 | 800 MHz Huawei Ascend Y200, Motorola Motoluxe XT615, Nokia Lumia 510, Lumia 610, Samsung Galaxy Mini 2 1 GHz Acer Liquid Glow, Advan Vandroid T1A, Alcatel One Touch Fire, HTC Desire V, Desire VC, Desire 200, Huawei Ascend Y210(D) (U8685), Ascend G300, Inspira (H867G), LG Optimus L7, Fireweb, Mobiistar Touch S03, Motorola Defy XT XT535, S-Nexian Mi430, Samsung Galaxy Ace Plus, Galaxy S Duos, Galaxy Young S6310/S6312, Omnia M, Sony Xperia E, Xperia J, ZTE Blade II, Blade III, Open |
| MSM7627A | Q4 2011 | Hisense E910, HTC Desire VC T328d, Huawei Ascend C8812, Glory (H868C), Karbonn A5, A15, LG Optimus Dynamic II (L39C), Micromax A56, A57, A87, Motorola Defy XT (XT555C), Walton Primo, ZTE Valet (Z665C) |
| MSM7225AB | | GeeksPhone Keon, LG Optimus L3 II, Optimus L3 II Dual |
| QSD8250 | Q4 2008 | Most Windows Phone 7.0 devices (excluding LG Optimus), Acer Stream/Liquid, Acer neoTouch S200, Dell Streak, Fujitsu Toshiba Mobile REGZA Phone T-01C, HP Compaq AirLife 100, HTC Desire, HD2, Nexus One, Huawei SmaKit S7, Lenovo LePhone, LG Optimus Q, Optimus Z, Panther, Pantech IM-A600S, IM-A650S, Sharp Lynx (SH-10B), Lynx 3D (SH-03C), Sony Ericsson Xperia X10, Toshiba Dynapocket (T-01B), TG01/TG02/TG03, Xolo QC800 tab |
| QSD8650 | Q4 2008 | Fujitsu F001 (FJ001), HTC Arrive, Droid Incredible, Evo 4G, Kyocera Echo, K009 (KY009), LG Apollo GW990, Fathom VS750, GW820 eXpo, GW825 IQ, Optimus 7, Quantum, NEC Casio CA007, Pantech Sirius an IS06 (PTI06), Sharp IS01 (SHI01), IS03 (SHI03), Sony Ericsson S004 (SO004), S005 (SO005), S006 (SO006), S007 (SO007), iida G11 (SOX02), Urbano Affare (SOY05), Toshiba Dynapocket IS02 (TSI01)/K01, Regza Phone IS04 (TSI04), Regza Phone T004 (TS004), T006 (TS006), T007 (TS007), T008 (TS008), X-Ray (TSX06) |

== Snapdragon S2 ==
| Model number | Sampling availability | Devices |
|---|---|---|
| MSM7230 | Q2 2010 | Acer Liquid Metal • Dell Flash, Smoke • HP Veer • HTC Desire Z; Huawei Ideos X5 (U8800) • NEC Casio Medias N-04C |
| MSM7630 | Q2 2010 | Casio G'zOne Commando • HTC Evo Shift 4G, Merge • Sky VegaXpress IM-A710K |
| APQ8055 | Q2 2010 | Nokia Lumia 900, Bambook Sunflower |
| MSM8255 | Q2 2010 | Acer Iconia Smart, Allegro • Fujitsu F-12C • HTC Desire HD, Desire S, Incredible S, Inspire 4G, One V, Radar; Huawei Ideos X5 (U8800 pro), Ideos X6 (U9000), Vision • LG Optimus Ultimate (L96G)/Sol E730, Eclypse; Motorola Pro+ • Pantech Vega X • Samsung Exhibit II 4G • Sharp Aquos Phone 003SH/005SH, Aquos Phone f (SH-13C), Aquos Phone the Hybrid (007SH/007SH J), Aquos Phone the Premium (009SH); Sony Ericsson Live with Walkman, Xperia active, Xperia arc, Xperia acro (SO-02C), Xperia pro, Xperia ray, Xperia neo, Xperia neo V, Xperia Play (GSM), Xperia Mini, Xperia Mini Pro • Sony Xperia Neo L; T-Mobile myTouch 4G • ZTE Tania, 008Z |
| MSM8655 | Q2 2010 | Fujitsu Toshiba IS12T • HTC Desire C (CDMA), Droid Incredible 2, Evo Design 4G, Rhyme, ThunderBolt; Kyocera Event, Hydro (EDGE), Rise • LG Optimus Showtime (L86C), Revolution (VS910) • Motorola Triumph; Pantech Mirach IS11PT • Samsung Conquer 4G • Sony Ericsson Xperia Play (CDMA), Xperia acro (IS11S); Sharp IS05 (SHI05) • Toshiba Regza Phone IS11T • ZTE Fury, Engage MT |
| MSM8255T | Q2 2010 | Alcatel OT-995 • BlackBerry Bold 9900/9930, BlackBerry Torch 9860 • Fujitsu Stylistic S01; HTC Flyer, Sensation XL, Titan, Titan II • Huawei U8860 Honor • Motorola Iron Rock XT626; Nokia Lumia 710, 800 • Samsung Focus S, Galaxy S Plus, Galaxy W, Omnia W, Rugby Smart; Sharp Aquos Phone SH-12C, Aquos Phone 006SH • Sony Ericsson Xperia arc S |
| MSM8655T | Q2 2010 | BlackBerry Torch 9810, Patagonia 9620 • Kyosera Digno ISW11K • NEC Casio Medias BR IS11N; Sharp Aquos Phone IS11SH, Aquos Phone IS12SH, Aquos Phone IS13SH • HP Pre 3 • ZTE Warp |

== Snapdragon S3 ==
| Model number | Sampling availability | Devices |
|---|---|---|
| APQ8060 | 2011 | HP TouchPad • HTC Amaze 4G, Jetstream, Raider 4G, Vivid • Le Pan II • LG Nitro HD • Pantech Element; Samsung Galaxy S II X (SGH-T989D), Galaxy S II LTE, Galaxy S Blaze 4G, Galaxy Tab 7.7 LTE |
| MSM8260 | Q3 2010 | 1.2 GHz: Asus Eee Pad Memo • HTC Evo 3D, Sensation • Huawei MediaPad (S7-301/302u) • LG Optimus LTE Tag; Samsung Galaxy Exhilarate (SGH-i577) • T-Mobile myTouch 4G Slide, SpringBoard • ZTE V71A, V9S; 1.5 GHz: HTC Sensation XE • KT Tech TAKE HD, TAKE JANUS, TAKE TACHY • Samsung Galaxy S II Skyrocket; Sony Xperia acro S, Xperia Ion, Xperia S • Xiaomi Mi 1; 1.7 GHz: HTC One S (Z560e) • Sony Xperia SL • Xiaomi Mi 1S |
| MSM8660 | Q3 2010 | HTC Evo 3D (CDMA), Rezound • Huawei MediaPad (S7-302c), LG Connect 4G, Lucid, Optimus LTE LU6200; Pantech Vega Racer, Sky LTE EX, Burst • Samsung Galaxy Note • Xiaomi Mi 1 (CDMA2000 for China Telecom) |

== Snapdragon S4 series ==
=== Snapdragon S4 Play ===
| Model number | Sampling availability | Devices |
|---|---|---|
| MSM8225 | 1H 2012 | Cherry Mobile Flare S100 • GeeksPhone Peak • HTC Desire SV, Desire X • Orange Nivo; Gionee Marathon M1; Huawei Ascend G510, Ascend G600, Ascend Y300 • LG Optimus L7 II (Dual) • Nokia Asha 230, X, X+, XL; Samsung Galaxy Core • ZTE (Vtelca) V8200+, Solar (Z795G) |
| MSM8625 | 1H 2012 | HTC One SC • Huawei Ascend Plus (H881C) • Samsung Galaxy Infinite (SCH-i759) • Smartfren Andromax C; ZTE Majesty (Z796C), Savvy (Z750C) |

=== Snapdragon S4 Plus ===
| Model number | Sampling availability | Devices |
|---|---|---|
| MSM8227 | 2H 2012 | HTC Windows Phone 8S • Sony Xperia M, Xperia M Dual; Nokia Lumia 520, Lumia 620, Lumia 720, Lumia 525 |
| MSM8627 | 2H 2012 | HTC Windows Phone 8S |
| APQ8030 | 3Q 2012 | |
| MSM8230 | 3Q 2012 | • See also: #Snapdragon 400 |
| MSM8630 | 3Q 2012 | • See also: #Snapdragon 400 |
| MSM8930 | 3Q 2012 | • See also: #Snapdragon 400 |
| APQ8060A | 2H 2012 | Lenovo IdeaTab S2110 |
| MSM8260A | Q1 2012 | Acer CloudMobile S500, Padfone • HTC One S (Z520e), Windows Phone 8X (selected versions); Haier w910 • Samsung Galaxy S Relay 4G • Sony Xperia T, Xperia TX • Vertu Ti; Nokia Lumia 920T |
| MSM8660A | Q1 2012 | HTC J (HTI13) (ISW13HT) • Sharp Aquos Phone Serie (ISW16SH) |
| MSM8960 | Q1 2012 | Asus Transformer Pad Infinity (3G/4G version) • BlackBerry Classic, Porsche Design (P'9983), Q10, Z10; HTC Droid Incredible 4G LTE, Evo 4G LTE, One X (North America), One XL, Windows Phone 8X; Huawei Ascend P1 LTE, Premia 4G • Kyocera Hydro Elite C6750, Hydro XTRM, Torque, Torque SKT01; LG Escape, Lucid 2, Mach, Optimus F5, Optimus F7, Optimus LTE II, Optimus Vu II, Spectrum 2; Motorola Atrix HD, Droid Razr M, Droid Razr HD (Razr HD outside US), Droid Razr Maxx HD; Nokia Lumia 810, Lumia 820, Lumia 822, Lumia 920, Lumia 925, Lumia 928, Lumia 1020; NEC Terrain • Panasonic Eluga Power • Pantech Discover, Perception, Flex, Vega PTL21 • Dell XPS 10; Qualcomm Snapdragon S4 Plus MSM8960 MDP/S • Samsung Ativ S, Galaxy S III (selected versions); Sharp Aquos Phone sv (SH-10D), Aquos Phone Zeta (SH-09D) • Toshiba Regza Phone (T-02D); Sony Xperia GX, Xperia SX, Xperia T LTE (Xperia TL in US), Xperia V • Xolo LT900; ZTE Avid 4G, Flash, Grand Era LTE, Grand X LTE, V96, Vital |

=== Snapdragon S4 Pro/Prime ===
| Model number | Sampling availability | Devices |
|---|---|---|
| APQ8064 | 2012 | ASUS PadFone 2 (A68) • HTC Droid DNA, J Butterfly • LG Optimus G, Nexus 4; Nubia Z5, Z5 Mini • Oppo Find 5, • Panasonic P-02E • Pantech Vega No.6, Vega R3; Qualcomm Snapdragon S4 Pro APQ8064 MDP/T • Sharp Aquos Phone Zeta (SH-02E); Sony Xperia UL, Xperia Z, Xperia ZL, Xperia ZR • Xiaomi Mi 2 |
| MSM8260A Pro | | Xiaomi Mi 2A |
| MSM8960T | Q2 2012 | Nokia Lumia 920T • Sony Xperia SP • Yota Devices YotaPhone C9660 |
| MSM8960T Pro (MSM8960AB) | | BlackBerry Z30 |
| MSM8960DT | December 19, 2013 | Motorola Droid Maxx, Droid Ultra, Droid Mini, Moto X |

== Snapdragon 2 series ==
=== Snapdragon 200 (2013) ===
| Model number | Sampling availability | Devices |
Snapdragon 200
| MSM8225Q | 2013 | Archos 45 Platinum, 50 Platinum, 53 Platinum, Bauhn WL-101GQC, BLU Studio 5.0 S, Studio 5.3 S, Casper Via A3216, CCE Motion Plus RK402, Faea F1, Highscreen Boost 2, Omega Prime Mini, HTC Desire 500, Desire 600, Desire 601, Desire 700 Dual Sim, Desire 709d, Desire 7088, Karbonn Titanium S1, Titanium S5, Micromax A113 Canvas Ego, A111 Canvas Doodle, Mito A355, Philips Xenium W7555, Panasonic P11, T11, Samsung Galaxy Win, Galaxy Win Pro, Xolo Q500, ZTE Blade V |
| MSM8625Q | 2013 | Coolpad 5890, 5950T Monster, 9150C Air, HTC Desire 500, Desire 600, Karbonn Titanium S5, Micromax A111 Canvas Doodle, EG111 Canvas Duet II, Prestigio MultiPhone 5300 DUO, MultiPhone 5400 DUO, Samsung Galaxy Win, Uniscope U W2014, ZTE Optik 2 |
| MSM8210 | 2013 | Huawei Ascend Y530, LG L35, L40, L40 Dual, L70, L70 Dual, L80 Dual, Motorola Moto E, Moto E Dual TV, Sony Xperia E1, Xperia E1 Dual, Nokia X2, Microsoft Lumia 435, Vodafone Smart 4, ZTE Concord II, Open II, Paragon, Sonata 2, Zinger, Acer Liquid M220 |
| MSM8610 | 2013 | Cherry Mobile Razor 2 (quad-core), Karbonn Titanium S1 Plus, Lava Iris 406q (quad-core), LG Optimus Exceed 2, Optimus Fuel (L34C), L40 Dual, L65 Dual, Ultimate 2 (L41C), Motorola Moto E, Smartfren Andromax C2, ZTE Paragon (z753g) |
| MSM8212 | 2013 | Alcatel One Touch Idol 2 Mini, Allview Impera I, Impera S, Asus ZenFone Go (ZB452KG), Huawei Ascend G6, Ascend G630, Honor Tablet, MediaPad 7 Youth2, Micromax A092 Canvas Unite, A121 Canvas Elanza 2, W092 Canvas Win, W121 Canvas Win, Microsoft Lumia 532, Lumia 535, Motorola Moto E (2nd gen) 3G only, Nokia Lumia 530, Lenovo A560, XOLO Q900S, Win Q1000 |
| MSM8612 | 2013 | HTC Desire 516, Desire 316, QMobile Noir LT-600, Smartfren Andromax G2, Andromax I3, Andromax I3s |
Qualcomm 205, Snapdragon 208, 210, 212 and 215
| MSM8905 (205) | 2017 | CAT B35, Nokia 8110 4G, 2720 Flip, 800 Tough, Smartfren Andromax Prime |
| MSM8208 (208) | 2014 | |
| MSM8909 (210) | 2014 | Acer Liquid Z330/M330; Archos 50b/55b Cobalt; Coolpad Catalyst, Illumina, Legacy Go; Huawei Honor 4A, Y6 (2015); HTC Desire 626s, Desire 520, Desire 530; Microsoft Lumia 550; Smartfren Andromax A; TCL Alcatel_4060A; Itel A22, A22 Pro; LG Rebel, Rebel 2, Risio 2, Spree; ZTE Blade A462 |
| MSM8909AA (212) | 2015 | Lenovo Yoga Tab 3, Microsoft Lumia 650, Jolla C, Smartfren Andromax E2, Andromax E2+, Evercoss Genpro X, Nokia 2, TP-Link Neffos Y5s |
| QM215 | 2019 | Alcatel 1A (2020) 5002F, 1B (2020) 5002D, AT&T Fusion Z, Motivate, Coolpad Tasker 10, Nokia 1.3, 1.4, Vsmart Star, Star 3, Bee Lite, LG K22, K22+, K32, K32+ |

== Snapdragon 4 series ==
=== Snapdragon 400 (2013) ===
| Model number | Sampling availability | Devices |
|---|---|---|
| APQ8026 | Q4 2013 | Asus ZenWatch, Zenwatch 2 (WI501Q), Asus Zenwatch 2 (WI502Q), LG G Pad 7.0, G Pad 8.0, G Pad 10.1, G Watch, G Watch R, Watch Urbane, Samsung Galaxy Tab Active, Gear Live, Sony SmartWatch 3, Motorola Moto 360 (2nd generation), Huawei Watch |
| MSM8226 | Q4 2013 | Asus PadFone mini 4.3, PadFone E, Atong H3, LG G2 Mini, G3 S D724, L90, L90 Dual, Microsoft Lumia 640, Lumia 640 XL, Mito Fantasy U, Motorola Moto G 8GB, Moto G dual 8GB, Moto G Colors Dual 16GB, Moto G (2nd Gen.), Nokia Lumia 630, Lumia 630 Dual SIM, Lumia 730 Dual SIM, Panasonic Eluga U, Prestigio PAP5507 Duo, Samsung Galaxy Grand 2, Galaxy S3 Neo+, Galaxy S5 Mini Duos, Galaxy Tab 4 8.0, Galaxy Tab 4 8.0 3G, Galaxy Tab 4 10.1 3G, Galaxy Tab 4 10.1, Galaxy Tab 4 Nook 10.1, Sony Xperia E3, Xperia E3 Dual, Xperia M2 Dual (D2302), Xperia M2 (D2305) |
| MSM8626 | Q4 2013 | |
| MSM8926 | Q4 2013 | Acer Liquid E600, Alcatel One Touch Idol S, OneTouch Pop 8S, OneTouch Pop S3, One Touch Pop S9, Allview V1 Viper S4G, Arrows M555/KA4, Asus ZenFone 5 A500KL, BenQ F5, T3, BLU Studio 5.0 LTE, Cat S50, Coolpad 5892-C-00, 7620L, 8729, 8702, Doov T90, Fujitsu Arrows M305/KA4, Gionee Ctrl V6L, GN715, ELIFE S5.1 (GN9005), Highscreen Spider, HTC Desire 610, Desire 612, One mini 2, One Remix, Huawei Ascend G535, Ascend P7 mini, EE Kestrel, InFocus M2, M510, M512, K-Touch Touch 5, Kogan Agora 4G, Kyocera Digno T, Hydro Icon, Hydro VIBE, THL L968, LG F90, G2 Mini LTE, G3 Beat, G Pad 7.0 LTE, G Pad 8.0, G Pad 8.0 LTE, G Pad 10.1, G Vista, Tribute, Volt, Wine Smart, Microsoft Lumia 640 LTE, Lumia 735 (Verizon CDMA version), Motorola Moto G LTE, Nokia Lumia 635, Lumia 636, Lumia 735, Lumia 830, Nubia 5S mini, Z5S mini LTE, Oppo Neo 5, Philips S399, QMobile Noir LT600, Samsung Galaxy Avant, Galaxy Core Lite LTE, Galaxy Core Mini 4G, Galaxy Grand 2 LTE-A, Galaxy Tab 4 7.0 LTE, Galaxy Tab 4 8.0 LTE, Galaxy Tab 4 10.1 LTE, Galaxy Tab Active LTE, Galaxy W, Tab Q, Sharp Aquos Crystal, Sony Xperia C3, Xperia E3 4G, Xperia M2 (D2303, D2305, D2306), Xperia M2 Aqua, TCL J730U, J938M, P688L, S838M, Uniscope US618, US818, US828, Unistar X3, Vivo X3F, X3L, X3V, Y22L, Y18L, Vtel X5, ZTE A880, Blade Apex2, Blade Vec 4G, Compel, Q505T, Q801U, Red Bull V5, Warp Sync, ZMax |
| APQ8028 | Q4 2013 | |
| MSM8228 | Q4 2013 | Allview V1 Viper S, Gigabyte GX2, Highscreen Boost 2 SE, HTC Desire 816 Dual, Lenovo Yoga Tablet 10 HD+, Samsung Galaxy S3 Neo, Galaxy S5 Mini, Sony Xperia T2 Ultra Dual, Xperia T3 3G Walton Primo S2, Xiaomi Redmi 1S (China Unicom), Xolo Q1100 |
| MSM8628 | Q4 2013 | Huawei B199, K-Touch M6, Uniscope XC2 E1230, Xiaomi Redmi 1S |
| MSM8928 | Q4 2013 | Gionee Elife S5.5L, HTC Desire 10 Lifestyle, Desire 650, Desire 816, Huawei Ascend Mate 2 4G, C199, Kyocera Brigadier, Oppo N1 mini, R1K, R1S, R3, R6007, Phicomm P660Lw, Sony Xperia T2 Ultra, Xperia T3 LTE, Xiaomi Redmi Note 4G, ZTE Star 1 |
| MSM8230 | | BlackBerry Q5, Z3, Gigabyte GSmart Simba SX1, HTC One SV (3G Version), Huawei Ascend W1, Ascend W2, LG Optimus L9 II, Samsung Galaxy Core Advance, Sony Xperia L, ZTE Sonata 4G |
| MSM8630 | | |
| MSM8930 | | Alcatel One Touch Idol S, BenQ F4, Coolpad Quatro II 4G 801 EM, HiSense X5T, HTC One VX, One SV (4G Version), One mini (601e), Windows Phone 8XT, Huawei Ascend G526, Ascend G740, LG Optimus F3, Optimus F3Q, Optimus F6, Enact, Nokia Lumia 625, Orange Boston 4G, Lumo 4G, Samsung Ativ S Neo, Galaxy Express (GT-I8730) Galaxy ACE 3 LTE (GT-S7275), ZTE Boost Max, Grand S Flex, Source, Unico LTE (Z930L), Warp 4G |
| MSM8930AA | | Alcatel OneTouch Sonic LTE, HTC First, One mini (LTE), Jolla Samsung ATIV S Neo |
| APQ8030AB | | |
| MSM8230AB | | Nokia Lumia 1320, Samsung Galaxy S4 Mini (GT-I9190), Galaxy S4 Mini Duos |
| MSM8630AB | | |
| MSM8930AB | | HTC Desire 601 Nokia Lumia 1320, Samsung Galaxy Express 2, Galaxy Golden, Galaxy Mega, Galaxy S4 Mini (GT-I9190, GT-I9195), Galaxy S4 Mini I9192 Duos, Galaxy S4 mini I9195 LTE, Galaxy Tab 3 7.0 (LTE Version) |

=== Snapdragon 410, 412 and 415 (2014/15) ===
| Model number | Sampling availability | Devices |
|---|---|---|
| APQ8016 (410) | 1H 2014 | 96Boards Dragonboard 410c, Modena; Alcatel OneTouch Pop 2 (OT-7044K); BLU Vivo Air LTE; Gree Phone; ASUS ZenFone Max (ZC550KL), ZenFone 2 Laser (ZE500KL); BQ Aquaris E5 4G; Coolpad E501; Yulong Coolpad 8860U; Cubot Zorro 001; HTC Desire 510, Desire 620, Desire 820q; Huawei Ascend G7, Ascend G620S, Ascend Y550, G621, Honor 4 Play, Y635; LG K10 (non-K430x version), F60, Lancet (VS820/VW820), Leon, X Screen; Lenovo A805e, A6000, Sisley S90, Vibe Z2; QMobile Noir Z8, Noir Z8 Plus, Noir Z9; Micromax Canvas Sliver 5; Motorola Moto E, Moto G; Oppo A37, Neo 5s, Neo 7; Samsung Galaxy A3, Galaxy A5, Galaxy Ace Style (LTE), Galaxy Ace 4, Galaxy E7, Galaxy J5, Galaxy Grand Max, Galaxy Grand Prime, Galaxy Mega 2 (SM-G7508Q), Galaxy Core Max, Galaxy S4 Mini Plus (GT-I9195I), Galaxy Tab 4 2015 (SM-T533); Smartfren Andromax Ec, Andromax Es, Andromax Q, Andromax Qi, Andromax R; TCL P520L; Vivo V1, Y13L, Y27; Vodafone Smart Tab 4G, Smart Prime 6; Yu Yuphoria; XOLO LT2000; Xiaomi Redmi 2, Redmi 2 Prime, Redmi 2 Pro; ZTE Lever, Q802D, V5 Max, V5S |
| MSM8916 (410) | 1H 2014 | |
| MSM8916 v2 (412) | 2H 2015 | BQ Aquaris X5; Lenovo K3, Vibe Z2 |
| MSM8929 (415) | | Alcatel OneTouch Pop Up; Coolpad R108; Hisense Pureshot, Pureshot Plus, C20 (King Kong 2); Lenovo Vibe K5; Micromax Canvas Amaze, Canvas Evok, Canvas Nitro 4G (E455); Smartfren Andromax R2 |

=== Snapdragon 425, 427, 430 and 435 (2015/16) ===
| Model number | Sampling availability | Devices |
|---|---|---|
| MSM8917 (425) | Q3 2016 | ASUS ZenFone Live (L2), ZenFone Max (M1) (16 GB); BQ Aquaris U Lite; Coolpad Canvas, Cool Play 6C, Splatter; Gionee Steel 3, M7 Mini; Infinix Hot 6 Pro, Hot 6X; itel S42; Vivo Y53; Nokia 2.1; Sharp Android One S1 (Japan); Huawei Honor 6C (Enjoy 6S in India, Nova Smart), MediaPad T3 8.0 2017, MediaPad T3 10 2017, Y6 Pro (2017) (P9 lite mini, Nova lite 2017), Y6 (2018), Y6 Prime (2018); Kyocera Android One S2 (Japan); Micromax Canvas Infinity; LG Aristo, Aristo 2, Aristo 3, Aristo 4, K8 (2017) (M200N, US215), K20 Plus (2017), K30, X4+, X300, Zone 4; Motorola Moto E4 (US), E5 Play; QMobile Q Infinity; Samsung Galaxy On5 (2016) Youth Edition, J2/J2 Pro (2018), J4+, J6+, J4 Core, Tab A (2017), Folder 2; Xiaomi Redmi 4A, Redmi 5A, Redmi Go, Redmi Note 5A (Redmi Y1 Lite in India); ZTE Blade A512 |
| MSM8920 (427) | Q1 2017 | Gionee S10C (S10 Lite in India), S10CL; Motorola Moto E5 Play, G6 Play |
| MSM8937 (430) | Q2 2016 | Archos 55 Diamond Selfie; ASUS ZenFone 3 Laser, ZenFone 3 Max (ZC553KL), ZenFone Max (M1) (32 GB); BLU Life One X2; BQ Aquaris U, Aquaris U Plus; Condor Plume L3 Plus; Gionee F6, F6L, S11 Lite; Hisense H10, Small Dolphin 2; Huawei Y7 (2018), Y7 Prime (2018) (Nova 2 lite in Malaysia), Y7 Pro (2018); Infinix Hot S3, Hot S3X; LG Stylus 2 Plus; Lenovo K6, K6 Note, K6 Power; Micromax Canvas Infinity Pro; Motorola Moto G5, G6 Play, E5 Plus (India, China); Medion X5520; Nokia 5, 6; SKY IM-100; Wiko U Feel Prime; Wileyfox Swift 2; Xiaomi Redmi 3S, Redmi 4 |
| MSM8940 (435) | Q4 2016 | Coolpad 5380CA, N1S, Note 6; Gionee M7 Power, Steel 2 Plus; HTC Exodus 1s; Huawei MediaPad M3 Lite, Y7 (Nova lite+, Ascend XT2 for AT&T), Y7 Prime (Enjoy 7 Plus in China, Honor Holly 4 Plus in India); LG K10 (2017) M257, Q6; Motorola Moto E5 Plus; Oppo A57; Palm Palm, 360 Vizza; Sugar F9, S9; Vsmart Joy 1, Joy 1+; Wiko View 2; Xiaomi Redmi 4X (Redmi 4 in India), Redmi Note 5A Prime (Redmi Y1 in India) |

=== Snapdragon 429, 439, 450 and 460 (2017–2020) ===
| Model number | Sampling availability | Devices |
|---|---|---|
| SDM429 (429) | Q2 2018 | Nokia 3.2; Samsung Galaxy Tab A (8.0", 2019) |
| SDM439 (439) | Q2 2018 | Redmi 7A, 8, 8A, 8A Pro (8A Dual in India) • Samsung Galaxy A01/M01 • Vivo Y93, Y95, U1, Y3 |
| SDM450 (450) | Q3 2017 | ASUS ZenFone 5 Lite/ZenFone 5Q; Blackberry Evolve; HTC Desire 12 Plus; Honor 7C; Huawei Honor 7C, Enjoy 9, Y7 (2019), Y7 Prime (2019), Y7 Pro (2019); LG K40 (USA); Motorola Moto G6; Realme 2, C1, C1 (2019); Samsung Galaxy A6+ (Galaxy A9 Star Lite in China), A02s/M02s/F02s, A11/M11, A20s, J8, Tab A (2018); Sugar C21, C13, F20, S11, S20, S30; Vivo V7+, V9 (Indonesia) (Y85); Vsmart Joy 2+; Xiaomi Redmi 5 |
| SM4250-AA (460) | Q1 2020 | AT&T Maestro Plus; Oppo A11s, A32/A33, A53/A53s; OnePlus Nord N100; Realme C15, C17; LG K92 5G; Motorola Moto E7 Plus, Moto G Play (2021), Moto G10/G10 Power; Nokia 3.4; TCL 20 SE; Vivo Y20/Y20i |

=== Snapdragon 480/480+ 5G (2021) ===
| Model number | Sampling availability | Devices |
|---|---|---|
| Snapdragon; 480 (SM4350) | Q1 2021 | AGM G1, G1 Pro; CAT S53; China Telecom Maimang 10 SE; China Unicom U-Magic 30e (VP003), 50; Motorola Moto G Stylus 5G, Moto G50; Nokia G50, G300, X10, X20, X100, XR20; OnePlus Nord N200 5G; Oppo A55s 5G, A74 5G, A93 5G; Redmi Note 10 JE, Note 10T (Japan); Sharp Aquos Wish; Sony Xperia Ace III; iQOO U3x; TCL Tab Pro 5G, 30 V 5G; Vivo Y31s, Y52s t1 (Y72 5G in India), Y53s |
| Snapdragon; 480+ (SM4350-AC) | Q4 2021 | Honor 70 Lite, Play 6C, Play 30, Play 30m, X8 5G; Nokia G400, G42; Motorola Moto G (2023), Moto G51 5G, Moto G53 5G (G53j 5G in Japan, G53s 5G for SoftBank, G53y 5G for Y!mobile), Moto G62 5G |

=== Snapdragon 4 (2022–2026) ===
| Model number | Sampling availability | Devices |
|---|---|---|
| Snapdragon; 4 Gen 1 (SM4375) | Q3 2022 | China Telecom Maimang 20; iQOO Z6 Lite; Vivo Y200 5G; Motorola Moto G (2024); Redmi Note 12 5G/Note 12R Pro |
| Snapdragon; 4 Gen 2 (SM4450) | Q2 2023 | Honor 200 Smart (Play 60 Plus in China), X7c 5G (X6b 5G), Play 9T; HMD Fusion; Lava Blaze Dragon; Mivi One; Poco M6 Pro 5G, M6 Plus 5G (2.3 GHz), M7 5G; Redmi 12 5G, 12R, Note 12R, 13 5G (2.3 GHz), Note 13R (2.3 GHz), 14C 5G, 14R; Sonim XP400; TCL K70 5G; Vivo V30 Lite, V30 SE, V40 Lite 5G (Indonesia), V40 SE 5G, Y6 (Y31t/Y500s), Y6t (Y60/Y60m), Y31 5G, Y32 5G, Y37 Pro, Y38, Y39, Y58 5G, Y100 (Indonesia), Y200e, Y200i, Y300, Y300i, Y400 5G, Y500i, Y600i |
| Snapdragon; 4s Gen 2 (SM4635) | Q3 2024 | Redmi A4 5G (Poco C75 5G) (2024); TCL Flip 4 5G, K32 5G (2025) |
| Snapdragon; 4 Gen 4 (SM4450-AF) | Q4 2025 | Honor 600 Smart (X7e Plus 5G), Play 11, Play 80 Plus (2026); Redmi Note 17 5G (Poco M8 Power) (2026) |
| Snapdragon; 4 Gen 5 (SM4850) | Q2 2026 | Oppo A7 Pro Max (2026); Poco M8x (2026); Redmi 17 5G (M100 in China) (2026) |

== Snapdragon 6 series ==
=== Snapdragon 600 (2013) ===
| Model number | Sampling availability | Devices |
|---|---|---|
| APQ8064-1AA (DEB/FLO); Advertised as S4 Pro | Q1 2013 | ASUS MeMO Pad FHD 10 LTE (ME302KL); Nexus 7 (2013) |
| APQ8064M | Q1 2013 | CompuLab CM-QS600; Inforce IFC6410; LeTV Super TV X60; Qubi; Xiaomi Mi TV |
| APQ8064T | Q1 2013 | Amazon Fire TV; ASUS PadFone Infinity; LG G Pad 8.3, Optimus G Pro, Gx; HTC One Max; InFocus IN810, IN815; JiaYu S1; Oppo N1, Find 5; Panasonic Eluga P (P-03E); Pantech Vega Iron; Samsung Galaxy S4 (i9505), Galaxy S4 Active; Vivo Xplay; Xiaomi Mi 2S; ZTE Grand Memo |
| APQ8064AB | Q1 2013 | HTC Butterfly S; Samsung Galaxy S4 (i9505/i9515) |

=== Snapdragon 610, 615 and 616 (2014/15) ===
| Model number | Sampling availability | Devices |
|---|---|---|
| MSM8936 (610) | Q3 2014 | Alcatel One Touch Pop Up; Micromax Canvas Nitro 4G; Panasonic Eluga Switch |
| MSM8939 (615) | Q3 2014 | Archos 50 Diamond; ASUS ZenFone 2 Laser (ZE551KL), ZenFone Selfie (ZD551KL); BQ Aquaris M5, Aquaris M5.5; Coolpad F2 LTE, TipTop Max; Gigaset Me Pure; HTC Desire 820, 826; Huawei P8 lite (US) •; Lenovo Vibe Shot, Vibe P1; LG G PAD x8.3; Motorola Moto G Turbo Edition, Moto X Play; Oppo R5/R5s/R7/R7 lite; Panasonic Eluga Switch; Silent Circle Blackphone 2; Smartisan U1 (Nut); Samsung Galaxy A5 (2016) (China), Galaxy A7; Sony Xperia M4 Aqua; Xiaomi Mi 4i; YU Yureka; ZTE Blade S6, Nubia Z9 Mini |
| MSM8939 v2 (616) | Q3 2015 | ASUS ZenFone 2 Laser (ZE601KL); Huawei Honor 5X (GR5), Maimang 4, Shot X (Honor 7i in China); Lenovo Lemon 3, Vibe K5 Plus; Xiaomi Redmi 3, Redmi 3 Prime; ZTE Axon Mini |

=== Snapdragon 617, 625 and 626 (2015/16) ===
| Model number | Sampling availability | Devices |
|---|---|---|
| MSM8952 (617) | Q4 2015 | AGM X1, Alcatel OneTouch Idol 4, CAT S60, Hisense Pureshot Plus 2, HTC One A9, Huawei G9, Honor 5A, LG G Vista 2, LYF Water F1, Sharp Aquos Xx3 mini, Motorola Moto G4, Moto G4 Plus, NuAns Neo, Nubia Z11 mini Samsung Galaxy C5, VAIO phone biz, Phone A, ZTE Zmax Pro |
| MSM8953 (625) | Q2 2016 | Alcatel Idol 5S, Asus ZenFone 3 (5.2") (ZE520KL), ZenFone 3 (5.5") (ZE552KL), ZenFone 3 Zoom (ZenFone Zoom S in Indonesia) (ZE553KL), ZenFone 3 Deluxe (5.5") (ZS550KL), Zenfone 4 Selfie Pro (ZD552KL), Bkav BPhone 2017, BlackBerry KeyOne, Motion, Coolpad Cool M7, Freetel Rai2 Dual, HiBy R8, Hisense A2 Pro, Huawei Nova, Nova Plus (G9 Plus in China, Maimang 5 for China Telecom), Lenovo K9 Plus, P2, S5, Meizu M6 Note, Motorola Moto Z Play, Moto G5 Plus, Moto G5S Plus, One, Nubia M2, N3, V18, Z11s mini, Oppo R9s, Samsung Galaxy C7, Galaxy On7 (2016) (China), Smartisan U2 Pro (32 GB), U3, Vivo X9, V5 Plus, Y79, ZTE Axon 7 MAX, Axon Max 2, Blade Max 3, Blade V8 Pro, Xiaomi Mi 5X (Mi A1), Mi A2 Lite (Redmi 6 Pro), Mi Max 2, Redmi 4 Prime, Redmi Note 4 (Qualcomm) (Redmi Note 4X (32 GB) in China), Redmi 5 Plus (Redmi Note 5 in India), Redmi S2 (Redmi Y2 in India), YotaPhone 3, Yu Yureka 2 |
| MSM8953 Pro (626) | Q4 2016 | 10.or (pronounce as tenor) G; BQ Aquaris X, Aquaris X Pro; Meizu 15 Lite (Meizu M15 in China); Motorola Moto Z2 Play; Samsung Galaxy C5 Pro, Galaxy C7 Pro; Smartisan U2 Pro (64,128 GB); Vivo V9 (Outside Indonesia); Wiko Wim |

=== Snapdragon 650 (618), 652 (620) and 653 (2015/16) ===
| Model number | Sampling availability | Devices |
|---|---|---|
| MSM8956 (650) | Q1 2016 | ASUS ZenPad 3 8.0 • Sony Xperia X, Xperia X Compact; Xiaomi Redmi Note 3 Pro, Mi Max (16 GB/32 GB) • Zebra TC70, Zebra TC75 |
| MSM8976 (652) | Q1 2016 | Alcatel OneTouch Idol 4S (6070K/6070Y) • Archos Diamond Alpha • BQ Aquaris X5 Plus • Coolpad Cool 1; ASUS ZenPad 3s 8.0, ZenFone 3 Ultra (ZU680KL) • HTC 10 Lifestyle, U11 EYEs • Oppo R9 Plus • LG G5 SE; LeEco Le 2 (India X520), Le S3, LeRee Le 3 • Lenovo Phab 2 Pro • LYF Water F1S • Micromax Dual 5 • Nubia Z17 Mini, Z11 Max; Samsung Galaxy Tab S2 (T713, T813, T817), Galaxy A9, Galaxy A9 Pro • Qiku 360 Q5 • 8848 M3; Vivo V3 Max, Xplay5, X6s, X6s Plus, X7, X7 Plus, X9s • Xiaomi Mi Max (64/128 GB, Mi Max Prime in China) |
| MSM8976 Pro (653) | Q4 2016 | AGM X2 • Coolpad Cool Play6 • Gionee M2017, M6S Plus • Nubia Z17 Mini, Z17s Mini, Z17 Lite; Oppo R9s Plus, F3 Plus • Qiku 360 N5, 360 N5s • Samsung Galaxy C9 Pro • Vivo X9 Plus, X9s Plus |

=== Snapdragon 630, 636 and 660 (2017) ===
| Model Number | Sampling availability | Devices |
|---|---|---|
| SDM630 | Q2 2017 | 360 N6, N6 Lite, Allview Soul X7 Pro, Asus ZenFone 4 ZE554KL, ZenFone 5 Lite, HTC U11 Life (HTC X2 in Japan), Lenovo K9 Note, Motorola Moto X4, Moto G6 Plus, Nokia 6.1, 7, Sharp Aquos C10, Aquos D10, Aquos S2 64 GB, Aquos S3, Aquos S3 Mini, Aquos Sense Plus, Sony Xperia XA2, Xperia XA2 Ultra, Xperia XA2 Plus, Xperia 10 |
| SDM636 | Q3 2017 | Smartisan U3 Pro SE, Asus Zenfone 5 ZE620KL, Zenfone Max Pro (M1), BlackBerry Key2 LE, HTC U12 Life, Huawei Honor 8X Max (4 GB RAM), Infinix Zero 6, Zero 6 Pro, Lenovo K5 Pro, Lenovo S5 Pro, Lenovo Z5, Meizu E3, Motorola Moto G7 Plus, Moto Z3 Play, One Power (P30 Note in China), P30, Moto X5, Nokia 6.1 Plus (X6 in China), 7.1, 6.2, Sony Xperia 10 Plus, T-Mobile Revvlry+, Vivo Z1i, Xiaomi Redmi Note 5 (Note 5 Pro in India), Note 5 AI Dual Camera, Note 6 Pro, Xiaomi Mi Max 3 |
| SDM660 | Q2 2017 | Asus Zenfone Max Pro M2, Zenfone 4, Blackberry Key2, Evolve X, CAT S62, Gionee M7 Plus, Samsung Galaxy S Light Luxury, A8 Star (Also called A9 Star), A6s, A9 (2018) (A9s), OPPO R11, R11 Plus, R11s, R11s Plus, R15 Pro, R15 Dream Mirror, K1 (64 GB only, 128 GB model is called R15x), R17 Neo (also called RX17 Neo in Europe), Cat S62 Pro, Sony Xperia XA3, Sharp Aquos S2 128 GB, Aquos S3 128 GB, Aquos R Compact, Vivo V9 6 GB (Indonesia), V11 Pro, X20, X20 Plus, X20 Plus UD, X21, X21 UD, X21s, Z1, X23 Symphony, Lenovo S5 Pro GT, Realme 2 Pro, Redmi Note 7 (India), Note 7 (International, Note 7S in India), Honor 8X Max (6 GB RAM), Huawei Y Max (Enjoy Max in China), Meizu 15, Nokia X71, 7 Plus, 7.2, Vsmart Active 1, Active 1+, 360 N7 Lite, N7, Smartisan U3 Pro, Xiaomi Mi Note 3, Mi 8 Lite, Mi 6X (Mi A2 outside China with Android One), Mi Pad 4, Mi Pad 4 Plus, ZTE Nubia Z18 Mini (ZTE Nubia M3) |

=== Snapdragon 632 and 670 (2018) ===
| Model number | Sampling availability | Devices |
|---|---|---|
| SDM632 (632) | Q2 2018 | ASUS ZenFone Max (M2) (ZB633KL) • Fairphone 3 • Huawei Honor 8C • LG W30 Pro; Meizu Note 8 • Motorola Moto E (2020), Moto G7, G7 Play, G7 Power • Redmi 7, Y3; T-Mobile Revvlry • Vsmart Joy 3, Joy 3+ NFC (Russia) |
| SDM670 (670) | Q3 2018 | Google Pixel 3a, Pixel 3a XL; Oppo R17; Samsung Galaxy Tab S5e; Vivo X23, Z3 (4 GB RAM) |

=== Snapdragon 662, 665, 675 and 678 (2019/20) ===
| Model Number | Sampling availability | Devices |
|---|---|---|
| SM6115 (662) | Q1 2020 | Hisense Hi Reader Pro, Crosscall Action X-5, Core M-5Honor 50 Lite, Huawei Nova 8i, Lenovo K12 Note, K12 Pro, K13 Pro, Tab P11, Xiaoxin Pad (2020), Motorola Defy (2021), Moto G9 Play (Moto G9 in India), Moto G9 Power, Moto G30, Moto G Power (2021), Nokia 5.4, C300, G100, Onyx BOOX Max Lumi, Note 5, Note Air2, Note Air2 Plus, Nova Air C, Page, Palma, Tab Mini C, Tab Ultra, Tab Ultra C, Tab X, Oppo A73, A74, A95, F17, F19, F19s, Reno6 Lite, Poco M3, Realme 7i (Asia), Redmi 9T (9 Power in India), Note 9 4G, Sonim XP3plus, XP5plus, Sony PlayStation Portal, Samsung Galaxy Tab A7 10.4 (2020), TCL 20L, 20L+, Vivo iQOO U1x, Y20T, Y31, Y51a, F(x)tec PRO¹ X |
| SM6125 (665) | Q2 2019 | Coolpad Legacy Brisa, Crosscall Core T-5, Crosscall Core X-5, HiBy R6 III, R6 Pro II, HTC Desire 20 Pro, Motorola Moto G Fast, Motorola Moto G Power, Moto G Pro, Moto G Stylus, Moto G8, Moto G8 Plus, Moto G8 Power, One Vision Plus. Nokia 5.3, Oppo A5 (2020), A11, A9 (2020) (A11x in China), A52, A72, A92, Reno3 A, Realme 5, 5i, 5s, Narzo 20A, Redmi Note 8, Note 8T, Reliance JioBook NB2112QB, RugGear RG935, Shanling M9 Plus, Sharp SH-T01, Sony Xperia 10 II, TCL 10 Plus, 10L, 10 Tabmid, 20S, Tabmax 10.4, TAB Disney Edition/Family Edition, T-Mobile Revvl 4+, Vivo S1 Prime, S1 Pro, U3x (China), U10, V17 (Russia), V20 SE, X50 Lite, Y9s, Y50, Y51, Y70, Vsmart Joy 4, Xiaomi Mi CC9e (Mi A3 outside China with Android One) |
| SM6150 (675) | Q1 2019 | Meizu Note 9, 16Xs, Vivo V15 Pro (S1 Pro in China), V17 Pro, V19 (Indonesia), X27 (128 GB), Z5i, U3 (U20 in India), Redmi Note 7 Pro, Samsung Galaxy M40 (Galaxy A60 in China), Galaxy A70, Galaxy A70s, Motorola Moto Z4, One Zoom, One Hyper, TCL Plex, 10 Pro, LG Q70 |
| SM6150-AC (678) | Q4 2020 | Moto G Stylus (2021), Redmi Note 10 |

=== Snapdragon 680 4G, 685 4G, 690 5G and 695 5G (2020–23) ===
| Model Number | Sampling availability | Devices |
|---|---|---|
| SM6225 (680 4G) | Q4 2021 | Chuwi HiPad Max, HMD Vibe, Honor Pad 8, Pad X8a, X7, X7b, X8, X8b, X9, Huawei Enjoy 60 Pro, Enjoy 60X, Nova 9 SE, Nova 10 SE, Nova 11 SE/Nova 12 SE, Nova 10 Youth, Nova 11i, Nova 12i (Enjoy 70 Pro in China), Nova 13i, Nova 14i, Nova Y90 (Enjoy 50 Pro in China), Nova Y91, iQOO U5x, Z6 4G, Lenovo Tab K11 Plus, Xiaoxin Pad (2022), LG Ultra Tab, Motorola Moto G32, Moto G42, Moto G52, Moto G Play (2024), Moto Tab G62, Oppo A36, A60, A76, A77s, A78 4G, A96, F21 Pro, K10, Pad Air, Reno7, Reno8, Realme 9, 9i, Redmi 10C, 10 (India), 10 Power, Note 11, Pad SE, Samsung Galaxy A23, Galaxy A05s, Galaxy M14, Vivo T1 44 W, T1x 4G/T1x (India), Y21e, Y21t, Y22s, Y27s, Y32, Y32t (V2180A), Y33t, Y35, Y36, Y55 |
| SM6225-AD (685 4G) | Q1 2023 | Honor 400 Smart (X7d), Pad X9 (Pad X8 Pro in China), Pad X9a, X7c, X7e Plus, Lenovo Xiaoxin Pad (2024), Oppo Reno12 F (Reno11 FS), Redmi 15 (Poco M7), Note 12, Note 13, Realme 12/13, 12 Lite/C67 4G, C85, C85 Pro, Tecno Megapad SE, Vivo V40 Lite, V50 Lite, V60 Lite, Y29, Y100, Y200, Y400 |
| SM6350 (690 5G) | Q2 2020 | FFALCON Thunderbird FF1, Hi Nova 9z, HTC Desire 21 Pro 5G, LG K92 5G, OnePlus Nord N10 5G, Sharp Aquos Sense 5G, Aquos Sense6, Sony Xperia 10 III, TCL 20 5G |
| SM6375 (695 5G) | Q4 2021 | China Unicom U-Magic 50 Plus, Honor Magic4 Lite, Magic5 Lite, X9 5G, X9a, X40, Hi Nova 9 SE, Nova 10 SE, HTC Desire 22 Pro, iQOO U5, Z6, Z7s, Z7x/Z7x (m), Lenovo Tab M10 5G, Motorola Edge 30 Neo, Moto G52j 5G, Moto G62 5G (India), Moto G71 5G, Moto G71s, Moto G82, Moto G84, Moto G34, Moto G Stylus 5G (2022), Nokia G60, X30, XR21 (HMD XR21), OnePlus Nord CE 2 Lite 5G, Nord CE 3 Lite 5G, Nord CE4 Lite, Nord N20 5G, Nord N30 5G, Oppo A1 5G, A1 Pro, A3 5G, A96 (China), A98 (F23 in India), Reno7 A, Reno7 Lite/Reno7 Z 5G/Reno8 Lite (F21 Pro 5G in India), Reno8 T 5G, Reno8 Z (F21s Pro 5G in India), Reno9 A, K10x, K11x, K12x (China), Poco X4 Pro 5G, X5 5G, Realme 9 5G (outside India), 9 Pro, 10 Pro, Pad X, Q5/Q5 Special, V25, Redmi Note 11 Pro 5G (Global) (Note 11 Pro+ 5G in India, Note 11E Pro in China), Samsung Galaxy A23 5G, Galaxy Tab A9+, Sharp Simple Smartphone 6, Simple Smartphone 7, Aquos Sense6s, Aquos Sense7, Aquos Sense7 Plus, Basio Active, Basio Active2, Sony Xperia 10 IV, Xperia 10 V, Vivo T1 (India), T2 (India), V29e, V29 Lite, V30 Lite, Y78 (Outside of China), Y78+, Y78+ (t1), Y100A, Y100 (China), Y200 Pro, Y300 Plus, Wiko 5G, Hi Enjoy 60 Pro |

=== Snapdragon 6 (2022–2026) ===
| Model number | Sampling availability | Devices |
|---|---|---|
| Snapdragon; 6 Gen 1 (SM6450) | Q1 2023 | Alldocube Palm Play mini 2 Wi-Fi (2024), iPlay 60 mini Turbo (2024); Honor Magic6 Lite (X9b), Magic7 Lite (X9c), Pad Z7 (2024), Pad 9 (2023), X50 (2023), X60 Pro (2024); iQOO Z8x (2023), Z9x (2024); Motorola Edge 50 Fusion (Latin America), Moto G Stylus 5G (2023), Moto G Stylus 5G (2024); Oppo A5 5G (China), F29 5G, Reno13 F 5G/FS 5G, Reno14 F/FS (2025), Reno15 F/FS (2026); Realme 12 Pro (2024), Realme 12 Pro (Extreme Edition), P1 Pro 5G (2024); Sharp Aquos Sense8 (2023) • Sony Xperia 10 VI (2024); T-Mobile REVVL 7 (T Phone 2), REVVL 7 Pro (T Phone 2 Pro) (2024); Vivo T3x 5G (2024), V30e 5G (Global/India), V40 Lite 5G (2024), Y78t (2023), Y100i Power (2023), Y200 5G (China), Y200t (2024), Y300 Pro (2024) |
| Snapdragon; 6s 4G Gen 1 (SM6115-AC) | Q3 2024 | Oppo A3, A3x (2024), A5, A5 Pro, A5x (2025) |
| Snapdragon; 6s 4G Gen 2 | Q4 2025 | Honor X8d (2025); Poco Pad C1; Redmi Note 17, Pad 2 9.7 (Redmi Pad 2 SE in China) (2026); Vivo Y31d (2026) |
| Snapdragon; 6s Gen 3 (SM6375-AC) | Q2 2024 | Honor 400 Smart 5G (X7d 5G) (2025), Play 80 Pro (2026); Motorola Moto G45 5G, Moto G85 (Moto S50 Neo in China) (2024); Redmi 15 5G (Poco M7 Plus, Poco M8s, Note 15R in China) (2025) |
| Snapdragon; 6 Gen 3 (SM6475-AB) | Q3 2024 | FCNT Raku Smartphone F-53E; Motorola Moto G75 5G (2024), Moto G Stylus (2025), Moto G Stylus (2026); Poco M8 5G (2026); Redmi Note 15 5G (2025), Note 15 SE 5G (2026); Samsung Galaxy A36 5G (2025), Galaxy A27 5G, Galaxy M47 5G/F70 Pro (2026); Sony Xperia 10 VII (2025), Xperia 10 VIII (2026) |
| Snapdragon; 6 Gen 4 (SM6650) | Q1 2025 | Honor Turbo (2026), X9d (Magic8 Lite), X70 (2025), X70 Pro Max (2026); Nothing Phone 4b (2026); Oppo K13 (K12s in China) (2025); Realme 14 5G, P3 (Neo7x in China) (2025) |
| Snapdragon; 6s Gen 4 (SM6435-AA) | Q4 2025 | Motorola Moto G57, Moto G57 Power (2025), Moto G Max (2026); Poco X8 (2026); Redmi Note 17 Pro (2026) |
| Snapdragon; 6 Gen 5 (SM6850) | Q2 2026 | Honor X80 Pro Max (2026); Poco X8 Power (2026); Redmi Note 17 Pro Max (2026) |

== Snapdragon 7 series ==
=== Snapdragon 710, 712, 720G and 730/730G/732G (2018–2020) ===
| Model number | Sampling availability | Devices |
|---|---|---|
| SDM710 (710) | Q2 2018 | 360 N7 Pro; Coolpad 26 Tibetan Peak Edition; HTC U19e; Lenovo Z5s, Z5 Pro, Z6 SE; Meizu 16X, X8; Motorola Razr (2019); Nokia 8.1 (X7 in China); Oppo R17 Pro (RX17 Pro in Europe), Reno, Reno A, K3; Realme 3 Pro (X Lite in China), X; Samsung Galaxy A8s (Galaxy A9 Pro (2019) in South Korea); Smartisan Pro 2s; Vivo NEX A, NEX A UD, X27 (256 GB), X27 Pro, Z3 (6 GB RAM), Z5x; Xiaomi Mi 8 SE, Mi 9 Lite (Mi CC9 in China), Mi CC9 Meitu Edition |
| SDM712 (712) | Q1 2019 | Realme 5 Pro (Realme Q in China), XT; Vivo Z5x 712 (Z1 Pro in India), Z5 (Z1x in India), S5; Xiaomi Mi 9 SE |
| SM7125 (720G) | Q1 2020 | iQOO U1; Logitech G Cloud; Oppo Reno4, Reno4 Pro, Reno5, Reno6; Poco M2 Pro; Redmi Note 9S (Note 9 Pro & Note 10 Lite in India), Note 9 Pro, Note 9 Pro Max; Realme 6 Pro, 7 Pro, 8 Pro; Samsung Galaxy A52, Galaxy A72, Galaxy Tab S6 Lite (2022); Sharp Aquos Sense4, Aquos Sense4 Plus; Vivo V20, V21e, Y50t |
| SM7150-AA (730) | Q2 2019 | Samsung Galaxy A80, Galaxy A71, Galaxy M51; Lenovo Z6; Redmi K20 (Xiaomi Mi 9T); Vivo X50 |
| SM7150-AB (730G) | Q2 2019 | Google Pixel 4a; Lenovo Tab P11 Pro; Motorola Moto G9 Plus, One Fusion+; Oppo K5, Reno2; Realme X2; Redmi K30 (Poco X2 in India); Xiaomi Mi Note 10 (Mi CC9 Pro in China), Note 10 Pro (Mi CC9 Pro PEin China) Mi Note 10 Lite |
| SM7150-AC (732G) | Q3 2020 | Motorola Moto G40 Fusion, G60; Poco X3, X3 NFC; Redmi Note 10 Pro, Note 10 Pro Max, Note 12 Pro; Xiaomi Mi 11 Lite |

=== Snapdragon 750G and 765/765G/768G 5G (2020) ===
| Model number | Sampling availability | Devices |
|---|---|---|
| SM7225 (750G) | Q4 2020 | Fairphone 4 • Lenovo Xiaoxin Pad Plus (2021), Tab P11 5G • Motorola Moto G 5G (One 5G Ace); Oppo Reno5 K 5G • OnePlus Nord CE 5G • Realme Q3 • TCL 20 Pro 5G • Sharp Aquos Zero6; Samsung Galaxy A42/M42, Galaxy A52, Galaxy F23/M23, Galaxy F52 5G, Galaxy Tab S7 FE; Xiaomi Mi 10T Lite, Mi 10i (Redmi Note 9 Pro 5G in China) |
| SM7250-AA (765) | Q1 2020 | Balmuda Phone • Motorola Moto G 5G Plus (One 5G) • Oppo Reno3 Youth; Sharp Aquos Zero5G Basic • TCL 10 5G |
| SM7250-AB (765G) | Q1 2020 | Google Pixel 4a (5G), 5, 5a • HTC U20 5G • iQOO Z1x • LG Velvet, Wing, Q92 5G; Motorola Edge, Razr (5G) • Nokia 8.3 5G • Nubia Red Magic 5G Lite (Nubia Play 5G); Oppo Reno3 Pro 5G (Find X2 Neo), Reno4 5G, Reno4 Pro 5G, Reno5 5G, Reno5 A, Reno3 Vitality Edition (Find X2 Lite), K7 5G • OnePlus Nord; Realme X50 5G, X50m 5G (X50 in Europe), X50t • Redmi K30 5G, K30i 5G; Samsung Galaxy A51 5G UW, Galaxy A71 5G UW • TCL 10 5G • Tosot G5; Vivo Z6 5G, S7 5G (V20 Pro), X50e, X50 5G, X50 Pro (X51); Xiaomi Mi 10 Lite, Mi 10 Lite Zoom • ZTE Axon 11, Axon 20, Axon 20 Premium |
| SM7250-AC (768G) | Q2 2020 | iQOO Z3 • Oppo K9 5G • Realme Q3 Pro Special • Redmi K30 5G Speed • ZTE A31, S30 Pro |

=== Snapdragon 778G/778G+, 780G and 782G 5G (2021–23) ===
| Model number | Sampling availability | Devices |
|---|---|---|
| SM7325 (778G) | Q2 2021 | Honor 50, 50 Pro, 60, V Purse • Hi Nova 9, Nova 9 Pro, Nova 10, Nova 10 Pro, Nova 11; Huawei Mate 50E (4G-only), Nova 9 (4G-only), Nova 9 Pro (4G-only), Nova 10 (4G-only), Nova 10 Pro (4G-only), Nova 11 (4G-only), Nova 11 Pro (4G-only), Nova 11 Ultra (4G-only), Nova 12 Lite (4G-only) (Nova 12s outside China), P50E (4G-only), Pocket S (4G-only), MatePad 2022 (BAH4-W19/BAH4-AL00) • Motorola Edge 20, Edge (2021), Edge Lite Luxury; Oppo K9s, K10 EE, Reno7 5G (China), Reno9, Reno10 (China), Reno10 Pro (outside China); Poco X5 Pro (Redmi Note 12 Pro Speed in China) • Realme 9 5G SE, GT ME, Q3s, Q3t; Samsung Galaxy A52s 5G, Galaxy A73 5G, Galaxy M52 5G, Galaxy Tab Active4 Pro, Galaxy Tab S7 FE (Wi-Fi model only), Galaxy Xcover 6 Pro • iQOO Z5, Z6 Pro; Vivo T1 (China), T1 Pro • Wiko X70 • Xiaomi 11 Lite 5G NE (Mi 11 LE in China), 12 Lite, Civi |
| SM7325-AE (778G+) | Q4 2021 | Honor 60 Pro, 70 • iQOO Z6 (China), Z6 Vitality • Motorola Edge 30 • Nothing Phone (1); Vivo S17, V29 • Xiaomi Civi 1S |
| SM7325-AF (782G) | Q4 2022 | Honor 80 • iQOO Z7 (China/Indonesia) • OnePlus Nord CE 3 5G • Oppo K11 |
| SM7350-AB (780G) | Q1 2021 | Xiaomi Mi 11 Lite 5G |
| QCM6490 (based on 778G) | Q3 2023 | Fairphone 5, ShiftPhone 8.1 |

=== Snapdragon 7 (2022–2026) ===
| Model number | Sampling availability | Devices |
|---|---|---|
| Snapdragon; 7 Gen 1 (SM7450-AB) | Q2 2022 | Honor 90 (2.5 GHz) • HTC U23, U23 Pro • Huawei MatePad 11.5 (MatePad 2023 in China); Motorola Edge 50 (2.5 GHz), Razr 40/Razr (2023) (2.5 GHz) • Nubia Flip • Oppo Reno8 Pro (China); Samsung Galaxy F55 5G (C55 5G in China), M55 5G, M55s 5G • Xiaomi 13 Lite, Civi 2 |
| Snapdragon; 7s Gen 2 (SM7435-AB) | Q3 2023 | HMD Skyline (2024); Meizu Lucky 08 (2024); Motorola Edge 50 Fusion, Edge (2024), Edge 60 Stylus, Moto G96, Moto G67 Power (Moto G100 in China) (2025); Poco Pad, X6 (2024); Realme 12 Pro+, 13 Pro, 13 Pro+ (2024), 14 Pro Lite (2025), P2 Pro (2024); Redmi Note 13 Pro 5G (2024), Pad Pro(2024); Sharp Aquos sense9 (2024) |
| Snapdragon; 7+ Gen 2 (SM7475-AB) | Q1 2023 | Poco F5 (Redmi Note 12 Turbo in China) • Realme GT Neo5 SE |
| Snapdragon; 7 Gen 3 (SM7550-AB) | Q4 2023 | Honor 100 (2023), 200, 300 (2024), 400, Pad 10, Power (2025); HTC U24 Pro (2024) • iQOO Z9 (Global/China), Z9s Pro (2024); Motorola Edge 50 Pro, Edge 50s Pro (2024); OnePlus Nord CE4 (2024); Oppo K12, K12 Plus (2024), F31 Pro+ (A6 Max/A6 GT/K13s in China) (2025); Sonim XP Pro (2024); Vivo S18 (2023), S19, S20, T3 Pro 5G, V30, V40 5G, Y200 GT (2024), V50 (2025) |
| Snapdragon; 7s Gen 3 (SM7635) | Q3 2024 | iQOO Z10 (2025); Lenovo ThinkTab X11 Gen 1 (2026); Meizu Note 22 Pro (Note 16 Pro in China) (2025); Motorola Edge 70 Fusion (2026); Nothing Phone 3a, Phone 3a Pro (2025); Realme 14 Pro+, P3 Pro 5G (2025); Redmi Note 14 Pro+ (2024); Sharp Aquos sense10 (2025); Vivo T4 5G, Y300 Pro+ (2025); Samsung Galaxy XCover 7 Pro, Galaxy Tab Active 5 Pro (2025); Fairphone Gen. 6 (2025) |
| Snapdragon; 7+ Gen 3 (SM7675-AB) | Q1 2024 | OnePlus Nord 4, Ace 3V (2024) •; Realme GT 6T, GT Neo6 SE (2024); Poco Pad X1 (2026); Sharp Aquos R9 (2024), Aquos R10 (2025); Xiaomi Pad 7 (2024) |
| Snapdragon; 7 Gen 4 (SM7750-AB) | Q2 2025 | Honor 400 (China) (2025), 600 (2026); Motorola Edge 70 (Moto X70 Air in China) (2025); Nothing Phone 4a Pro (2026); Oppo Reno15c (2025), Reno15 (Global) Reno16 (2026); Realme 15 Pro, P4 Pro (2025), 16 Pro+ (2026); Vivo S30, T4 Pro, V60 (2025), V70, V80 (2026) |
| Snapdragon; 7s Gen 4 (SM7635-AC) | Q3 2025 | Infinix Note 60 Pro (2026); Motorola Edge 70 Fusion (India), Edge 70 Fusion+ (2026); Nothing Phone 4a (2026); OnePlus Nord CE6, Turbo 6V (2026); Poco M8 Pro, Pad M1 (2026); Redmi Note 15 Pro+, Pad 2 Pro (2025); Vivo T5 Pro (iQOO Z11), Y600 Turbo (2026) |

== Snapdragon 8 series ==
=== Snapdragon 800, 801 and 805 (2013/14) ===
| Model number | Sampling availability | Devices |
|---|---|---|
| APQ8074AA (800) | Q2 2013 | 2.15 GHz: Sony Xperia Z Ultra (Wi-Fi edition); 2.26 GHz: Amazon Kindle Fire HDX Tablet |
| MSM8274AA (800) | Q2 2013 | 2.15 GHz: IUNI U2, Sony Xperia Z Ultra (HSPA+ edition); 2.26 GHz: Allview X1 Xtreme, Lenovo Vibe Z, QMobile Noir Quatro Z5, Walton Primo ZX |
| MSM8674AA (800) | Q2 2013 | |
| MSM8974AA (800) | Q2 2013 | 2.15 GHz: Acer Liquid S2, Asus PadFone Infinity; Gionee ELIFE E7; Sharp Aquos Xx 302SH, Aquos Xx mini 303SH; Sony Xperia Z Ultra, Xperia Z1 (Z1s), Xperia Z1 Compact; ZTE Nubia Z5s; 2.26 GHz: Amazon Fire Phone; Lenovo Vibe Z LTE; LG G Flex, G Pro 2, G2, Nexus 5, Vu 3; Microsoft Surface Mini (prototype); Nokia Lumia 1520, Lumia Icon, Lumia 930; Pantech Vega LTE-A, Vega Secret Note, Vega Secret UP; Samsung ATIV SE, Galaxy J, Galaxy Round, Galaxy Note 3 (LTE variant), Galaxy Note 10.1 2014 Edition (LTE variant), Galaxy Note Pro 12.2 (LTE variant), Galaxy S4 LTE+, Galaxy S4 LTE-A, Galaxy Tab Pro (12.2 & 10.1) (LTE variant), Galaxy Tab Pro 8.4, Galaxy Tab S 10.5 LTE, Galaxy Tab S 8.4 LTE; YotaPhone 2; ZTE Grand S II LTE |
| MSM8974AA v3 (801) | Q3 2014 | BlackBerry Passport; IUNI U3; OnePlus X (with 578 MHz GPU, Oppo A30 in China), Oppo N3; Vivo Xshot Elite |
| APQ8074AB v3 (801) | Q4 2013 | Sony Xperia Z2 Tablet (WiFi-only variant) |
| MSM8274AB (800) | Q4 2013 | BLU Life Pure XL; Xiaomi Mi 3W (China Unicom WCDMA version) |
| MSM8674AB v3 (801) | Q2 2013 | Xiaomi Mi 3C (China Telecom CDMA version) |
| MSM8974AB v3 (801) | Q4 2013 | Asus PadFone S; BKAV BPhone; Fairphone 2; Fujitsu Arrows NX F-02G, Arrows NX F-05F, Arrows Tab F-03G; Hisense X1, X9T; HTC Desire Eye, One (M8) (International version), One (M8) Eye; IUNI U3, Coolpad 8971; Oppo Find 7a (International edition); Panasonic Lumix Smart Camera CM1; Pantech Vega Iron 2 (A910); Sharp Aquos Crystal X, Aquos Xx 304SH, Aquos Zeta SH-04F; Sony Xperia Z2 Tablet (LTE variant), Xperia Z2a, Xperia Z2, Xperia ZL2 SOL25; Vertu Aster; Vivo Xplay 3S; ZTE Nubia Z5S LTE, Nubia W5 |
| MSM8274AC v3 (801) | Q2 2014 | Lenovo Vibe Z2 Pro (K920); Smartisan T1, Xiaomi Mi 4W (China Unicom WCDMA version) |
| MSM8974AC v3 (801) | Q1 2014 | BKAV BPhone 2015; Gionee ELIFE E7L; Infobar A03; InFocus M810; IUNI U3; HTC Butterfly 2, Desire Eye, One (E8), One (M8) Eye, One (M8) (Asia version); LG G3, Isai FL, Isai VL; Lenovo K920 TD-LTE (China Mobile version); Motorola Moto X (2nd Gen.), Lex L11; OnePlus One; Oppo Find 7; Panasonic Lumix Smart Camera CM1; Philips i966 Aurora; Samsung Galaxy S5, Galaxy S5 Active, Galaxy S5 Duos, Galaxy S5 Sport, Galaxy S5 TD-LTE; Sharp Aquos Crystal X; Sony Xperia Z3, Xperia Z3 Compact, Xperia Z3 Tablet Compact, Xperia Z3v, Xperia Z3 Dual; Vertu Aste; Vivo Xshot Ultimate; Xiaomi Mi 4, Mi Note; ZTE Nubia W5, Nubia X6 (TD-LTE 128 GB), Nubia Z7, Nubia Z7 Max; ZUK Z1 |
| APQ8084 (805) | Q1 2014 | Amazon Fire HDX 8.9; Inforce IFC6540, LG G3 Cat.6, Motorola Droid Turbo (Moto MAXX outside USA), Nexus 6 (Moto X Pro in mainland China), Samsung Galaxy Note Edge, Galaxy Note 4 LTE, Galaxy Note 4 Duos, Galaxy S5 LTE-A (Korea), Galaxy S5+ |

=== Snapdragon 808 and 810 (2015) ===
| Model number | Sampling availability | Devices |
|---|---|---|
| MSM8992 (808) | Q3 2014 | Acer Liquid Jade Primo, Liquid Jade 2; BlackBerry Priv; Lenovo Vibe X3; LG G4, V10, X mach/X fast; Microsoft Lumia 950; Motorola Moto X Style/Pure Edition; Nexus 5X; Nextbit Robin; Qiku Q Terra/Flagship; Sharp Aquos Zeta (SH-01H), Aquos Compact (SH-02H), Aquos Xx2, Aquos Xx2 mini, Aquos Serie mini (SHV33), Disney Mobile on docomo (DM-01H); Samsung SM-G9198; Smartisan T2; Xiaomi Mi 4c, Mi 4S |
| MSM8994 (810) | Q3 2014 | BenQ F52; Coolpad Fengshang C+; Doogee F3 Ltd; Fujitsu Arrows F-04G; Gigaset Me, Me Pro; HTC Butterfly 3, One M9, Bolt (USA) (HTC 10 evo (Intl)); LG G Flex 2; LeTV Le Max Le One Pro; Microsoft Lumia 950 XL; Motorola Droid Turbo 2/Moto X Force; Nexus 6P; OnePlus 2; Qiku Prime; Qualcomm Snapdragon MDP; Sirin Labs Solarin; Sharp Aquos Zeta (SH-03G), Aquos Pad (SH-05G), Aquos Xx; Sony Xperia Z3+ (Xperia Z4 in Japan), Xperia Z4 Tablet, Xperia Z5, Xperia Z5 Premium, Xperia Z5 Compact; Xiaomi Mi Note Pro; Vertu Signature Touch; YU Yutopia; ZTE Axon, Axon Pro, Axon Lux, Axon Elite, Nubia Z9, Nubia Z9 Elite, Nubia Z9 Exclusive, Nubia Z9 Max; Nubia Z9 Max Elite |

=== Snapdragon 820 and 821 (2016) ===
| Model number | Sampling availability | Devices |
|---|---|---|
| MSM8996 (820) | Q4 2015 | Alcatel Idol 4S Windows 10 Mobile (6071 W); Asus ZenFone 3 Deluxe (5.7" 64 GB) (ZS570KL); BlackBerry DTEK60, Light L16, 8848 M4; Gree Phone 2 (G0215D), Gree Phone Color World (G0245D); HP Elite X3, HTC 10; LG G5, LG Q8, LG V20; LeEco (LeTv) Le Max 2 (X820), LeEco (LeTv) Le Max Pro (X910); LeEco (LeTv) Le Pro 3 Elite (LEX722), LeEco (LeTv) Le X920 (prototype); Motorola Moto Z (USA), Motorola Moto Z Force; OnePlus 3, Qiku 360 Q5 Plus; Samsung Galaxy S7 (SM-G9300/A/P/T/U/V); Samsung Galaxy S7 Edge (SM-G9350/A/P/T/U/V); Samsung Galaxy S7 Active, Samsung Galaxy Tab S3, Samsung W2017; Samsung Galaxy Note 7 (North America/China/HongKong/Japan); Sharp Aquos Zeta SH-04H, Sharp Aquos Serie SHV34, Sharp Aquos XX3; Sony Xperia X Performance, Sony Xperia XZ, Sony Xperia XZs; TCL 950, Vertu Constellation; Vivo Xplay 5 Elite, Vivo Xplay 6; Xiaomi Mi 5 (64 GB/128 GB); ZTE Axon 7, ZTE Nubia Z11; ZUK Z2 (Lenovo Z2 Plus in India), ZUK Z2 Pro |
| MSM8996; Lite (820) | Q1 2016 | Motorola Moto Z (non-USA model); Xiaomi Mi 5 (32 GB) |
| MSM8996; Pro-AB (821) | Q2 2016 | HTC U Ultra; Google Pixel, Google Pixel XL; Xiaomi Mi 5s |
| MSM8996; Pro-AC (821) | Q3 2016 | Asus Zenfone AR, Asus Zenfone Ares (2018); Asus ZenFone 3 Deluxe (5.7" 256 GB) (ZS570KL); Gree Phone G3s (G0335D); LG G6, LG G6+, LG G7 Fit, LG Q9, LG G Pad 5 10.1; LeEco Le Pro 3, LeEco Le Max3 (LEX850) (prototype); LeEco Cool Changer S1, LeEco Le Turbo (LEX950) (prototype); Oculus Go; OnePlus 3T, Smartisan M1, Smartisan M1L; Xiaomi Mi 5s Plus, Xiaomi Mi Note 2, Xiaomi Mi MIX; ZTE Axon 7s, ZTE Axon M, ZUK Edge |

=== Snapdragon 835 (2017) ===
| Model number | Sampling availability | Devices |
|---|---|---|
| MSM8998 (835) | Q2 2017 | ASUS ZenFone 4 Pro (Z01GD); Essential PH-1; F(x)tec PRO¹; Google Pixel 2, Pixel 2 XL; HTC U11, U11+; LG G7 One, Signature Edition, V30, V30+, V30S ThinQ, V30S+ ThinQ; Motorola Moto Z3, Moto Z2 Force; Nokia 8, 8 Sirocco; OnePlus 5, 5T; Oculus Quest; Razer Phone; Red Hydrogen One; Samsung Galaxy S8 (USA/Canada/China/Hong-Kong/Japan), Galaxy S8+ (USA/Canada/China/Hong-Kong/Japan); Galaxy S8 Active (AT&T USA), Galaxy Note 8 (USA/Canada/China/Hong-Kong/Japan); Galaxy Tab S4, W2018; Sharp Aquos R, Aquos V; Sony Xperia XZ Premium, Xperia XZ1, Xperia XZ1 Compact; Xiaomi Mi 6, Mi MIX 2, Achilles prototype (Cancelled); ZTE Nubia Z17, Nubia Z17S, Nubia Red Magic |

=== Snapdragon 845 (2018) ===
| Model number | Sampling availability | Devices |
|---|---|---|
| SDM845 | Q1 2018 | ASUS ROG Phone (2.96 GHz), ASUS ZenFone 5Z; Black Shark, Helo; Google Pixel 3, Pixel 3 XL; HTC Exodus 1, U12+; LG G7 ThinQ, G7+ ThinQ, V35 ThinQ, V35+ ThinQ, V40 ThinQ, V40+ ThinQ, Signature Edition (2018), Velvet (4G); Meizu 16th, 16th Plus, Zero; Nokia 9 PureView; Nubia Red Magic Mars, X, Z18; OnePlus 6, OnePlus 6T, OnePlus 6T (McLaren Edition); Oppo Find X, Find X SuperVOOC, Find X (Automobili Lamborghini Edition); Razer Phone 2; Samsung Galaxy S9 (USA/Canada/China/Hong-Kong/Japan/Latin America); Galaxy S9+ (USA/Canada/China/Hong-Kong/Japan/Latin America), Galaxy Note 9 (USA/Canada/China/Hong-Kong/Japan/Latin America), W2019; Sharp Aquos R2, Sharp Aquos R2 Compact, Sharp Aquos Zero; Shiftphone Shift6mq • Smartisan R1; Sony Xperia XZ2, Xperia XZ2 Compact, Xperia XZ2 Premium, Xperia XZ3; Vivo iQOO Neo, NEX (S), NEX Dual Display; Xiaomi Mi 8, Mi 8 Explorer Edition, Mi MIX 2S, Mi MIX 3, Mi MIX 3 (The Palace Museum Edition), Pocophone F1, Mi 8 Pro (Mi 8 UD in China); ZTE Axon 9 Pro |

=== Snapdragon 855/855+ (2019) and 860 (2021) ===
| Model number | Sampling availability | Devices |
|---|---|---|
| SM8150 (855) | Q1 2019 | ASUS ZenFone 6 (ASUS 6Z in India); Black Shark 2 • China Mobile Forerunner X1; Google Pixel 4, Google Pixel 4 XL; HTC 5G Hub • Vivo iQOO Neo 855; LG G8 ThinQ, G8s ThinQ, V50 ThinQ, G8x ThinQ (USA)/V50s ThinQ (South Korea); Lenovo Z5 Pro GT, Lenovo Z6 Pro (4G/5G); Meizu 16s, 16T; Microsoft Surface Duo; Nubia Red Magic 3, mini 5G; OnePlus 7, 7 Pro (4G/5G); Oppo Reno 10x Zoom, Oppo Reno 5G; Redmi K20 Pro (Xiaomi Mi 9T Pro) • Royole Flexpai; Samsung Galaxy A90 5G, Galaxy Fold, Galaxy Tab S6, Galaxy S10 (USA/Canada/China/Hong-Kong/Japan/Latin America); Galaxy S10+ (USA/Canada/China/Hong-Kong/Japan/Latin America); Galaxy S10e (USA/Canada/China/Hong-Kong/Japan/Latin America); Galaxy S10 5G (USA), Galaxy S10 Lite; Galaxy Note 10 (USA/Canada/China/Hong-Kong/Taiwan/Japan/Latin America); Galaxy Note 10+ (USA/Canada/Hong-Kong/Taiwan/Japan/Latin America); Sharp Aquos R3, Sharp Aquos Zero 2; Sony Xperia 1, Xperia 5; Xiaomi Mi 9, Mi MIX 3 5G; ZTE Axon 10 Pro (4G/5G) |
| SM8150-AC (855+) | Q3 2019 | ASUS ROG Phone II; Black Shark 2 Pro; Vivo iQOO Pro (4G/5G), iQOO Neo 855 Racing; Meizu 16s Pro • Oppo Reno Ace; Nubia Red Magic 3s, Nubia Z20; OnePlus 7T, OnePlus 7T Pro (4G/5G); Realme X2 Pro, Realme X3, Realme X3 SuperZoom; Redmi K20 Pro (Premium Edition); Samsung Galaxy A82 5G, Samsung Galaxy Z Flip, Samsung W20 5G; Samsung Galaxy Quantum2 (Galaxy A82 5G in South Korea); Smartisan Pro 3; Vivo NEX 3 (4G/5G); Xiaomi Mi 9 Pro |
| SM8150-AD (860) | Q1 2021 | Poco X3 Pro; Xiaomi Pad 5 |

=== Snapdragon 865/865+ 5G (2020) and 870 5G (2021) ===
| Model number | Sampling availability | Devices |
|---|---|---|
| SM8250 (865) | Q1 2020 | ASUS ROG Phone 3 Strix, ASUS ZenFone 7; Black Shark 3, Black Shark 3S, Black Shark 3 Pro; FCNT Arrows 5G • 8848 M6; Huawei MatePad 11 (2021), Huawei MatePad 11 (2023); Vivo iQOO 3 (4G/5G), iQOO Neo3, iQOO 5, iQOO 5 Pro; LG V60 ThinQ • Motorola Edge+; Meizu 17, Meizu 17 Pro; Nubia Red Magic 5G, Nubia Red Magic 5S; Oppo Find X2, Oppo Find X2 Pro, Oppo Find X3 Neo; Oppo Find X2 Pro (Automobili Lamborghini Edition); Oppo Ace2, Oppo Reno5 Pro+ (Oppo Find X3 Neo); OnePlus 8, OnePlus 8 Pro, OnePlus 8T; Realme X50 Pro, Realme X50 Pro Play; Redmi K30 Pro (Poco F2 Pro), Redmi K30 Pro Zoom, Redmi K30S Ultra; Royole FlexPai 2 • Vertu Ayxta Fold (based on Royole FlexPai 2); Samsung Galaxy S20 (North America); Samsung Galaxy S20 Plus (North America/China); Samsung Galaxy S20 Ultra (North America); Samsung Galaxy S20 FE LTE (Post April 2021); Samsung Galaxy S20 FE 5G (North America); Sharp Aquos R5G • Smartisan R2; Sony Xperia 1 II, Sony Xperia 5 II, Sony Xperia PRO; Vivo NEX 3S, Vivo X50 Pro+; Xiaomi Mi 10, Xiaomi Mi 10 Pro, Xiaomi Mi 10 Ultra; Xiaomi Mi 10T (Redmi K30S Ultra), Xiaomi Mi 10T Pro; ZTE Axon 10s Pro; AYN Thor Lite (2025) |
| SM8250-AB (865+) | Q2 2020 | ASUS ROG Phone 3, ASUS ZenFone 7 Pro; Lenovo Legion Duel, Lenovo Legion Phone Pro; Samsung Galaxy Note 20 (North America/China/Korea); Samsung Galaxy Note 20 Ultra (North America/China/Korea); Samsung Galaxy Tab S7, Samsung Galaxy Tab S7+, Samsung W21; Samsung Galaxy Z Flip 5G, Samsung Galaxy Z Fold2 5G |
| SM8250-AC (870) | Q1 2021 | Black Shark 4, Black Shark 4S, Black Shark 5, Black Shark 5 High Energy; Huawei MatePad Pro 10.8 (2021), Huawei MatePad Pro 11 (GOT-W29); Huawei MatePad 11 (PaperMatte Edition) (2023); Vivo iQOO Neo5 (iQOO 7 in India), iQOO Neo5 Lite, iQOO Neo5 SE; iQOO Pad Air, iQOO Neo6 (international, a.k.a. Neo6 SE in China); Lenovo Legion Y700 (2022), Lenovo Yoga Pad Pro (Lenovo Yoga Pad 13); Lenovo Tab P12 Pro (Xiaoxin Pad Pro 12.6 in China), Lenovo Xiaoxin Pad Pro 12.7; Lenovo Xiaoxin Pad Pro 2021, Lenovo Xiaoxin Pad Pro 2022 (Snapdragon); Motorola Edge S (Moto G100), Motorola Edge 20 Pro (Edge S Pro); Meizu 18X • Nubia Z40 • OnePlus 9R • Poco F4 • Tosot G7 (G0615D); Oppo Pad, Oppo Find X3, Oppo Reno6 Pro (Snapdragon), Oppo Reno6 Pro+; Realme GT Explorer (Master Edition), Realme GT Neo2; Realme Q5 Pro (Realme GT Neo3T outside China); Redmi K40 (Poco F3/Poco Mi 11X), Redmi K40S; Vivo Pad, Vivo Pad Air, Vivo S16, Vivo T2 (Cancelled); Vivo X60 (Outside mainland China), Vivo X60 Pro (Outside mainland China); Xiaomi Mi 10S, Xiaomi 12X, Xiaomi Pad 6; Xiaomi Pad 5 Pro (Wi-Fi & 5G), Xiaomi Pad 5 Pro 12.4; ZTE Axon 30, ZTE Axon 30S, ZTE Axon 40 Pro, ZTE A41 |

=== Snapdragon 888/888+ 5G (2021) ===
| Model number | Sampling availability | Tablets |
|---|---|---|
| SM8350 (888) | Q1 2021 | ASUS ROG Phone 5, ASUS ROG Phone 5 Pro, ASUS ROG Phone 5 Ultimate; ASUS ZenFone 8 (ASUS 8Z in India), ASUS ZenFone 8 Flip; Black Shark 4 Pro, Black Shark 5 RS (8 GB RAM); Honor MagicPad, Honor Magic3, Honor X40 GT, Honor X40 GT Racing Edition; Huawei MatePad Air, Huawei MatePad Pro 11 (GOT-W09/GOT-AL09/GOT-AL19); Huawei P50 (4G-only), Huawei P50 Pocket (4G-only); Huawei P50 Pro (JAD-AL00/JAD-AL80) (4G-only); Huawei Mate Xs 2 (4G-only), Huawei Mate Xs 2 Premium Edition (4G-only); Infinix Xpad GT • iQOO 7 (China), 7 Legend, 8, Neo5s (9 SE in India); Vivo iQOO 9 SE; LG Velvet 2 Pro (Unreleased), LG Rollable (Unreleased); Lenovo Legion Duel 2 (Legion Phone 2 Pro); Meizu 18, Meizu 18 Pro • Nubia Pad 3D, Nubia Z30 Pro; Nubia Red Magic 6, Nubia Red Magic 6 Pro, Nubia Red Magic 6R; OnePlus 9, OnePlus 9 Pro, OnePlus 9RT; Oppo Find X3 Pro, Oppo Find X3 Pro Mars, Oppo Find X3 Pro Lensman; Oppo Find X5, Oppo Find N, Oppo K10 Pro; Realme GT, Realme GT2, Realme Flash (Demo Prototype); Redmi K40 Pro, Redmi K40 Pro+ (Xiaomi Mi 11i/Mi 11X Pro); Smartphone for Snapdragon Insiders; Samsung Galaxy S21 (USA/Mainland China/Hong Kong/Taiwan); Samsung Galaxy S21+ (USA/Mainland China/Hong Kong/Taiwan); Samsung Galaxy S21 Ultra (USA/Mainland China/Hong Kong/Taiwan); Samsung Galaxy S21 FE (USA/Europe/Mainland China/Hong Kong/Taiwan/India 2023 model); Samsung Galaxy Z Fold 3, Samsung Galaxy Z Flip 3, Samsung W22; Sony Xperia 1 III, Sony Xperia 5 III, Sony Xperia PRO-I; Sharp Aquos R6 • Leitz Phone 1; Microsoft Surface Duo 2 • TD Tech P50; Vivo X60 Pro+, Vivo X60t Pro+; Xiaomi Mi 11, Xiaomi Mi 11 Pro, Xiaomi Mi 11 Ultra, Xiaomi 11T Pro, Xiaomi Mi MIX Fold; ZTE Axon 30 Pro, ZTE Axon 30 Ultra, ZTE A31 Pro, ZTE A31 Ultra; iVERTU 5G (based on ZTE Axon 30 Pro) |
| SM8350-AC (888+) | Q3 2021 | ASUS ROG Phone 5s, ASUS ROG Phone 5s Pro; Black Shark 4S Pro, Black Shark 5 RS (12 GB RAM); Honor Magic3 Pro, Honor Magic3 Pro+; Vivo iQOO 8 Pro, iQOO 9 (India/Global); Meizu 18s, Meizu 18s Pro; Motorola Edge S30 (Moto G200 5G); Motorola Moto S30 Pro (Edge 30 Fusion); Nubia Red Magic 6s Pro; Realme GT 2 Fold (Cancelled); Vivo X70 Pro+; Xiaomi MIX 4 |

=== Snapdragon 8/8+ Gen 1 (2022) ===
| Model number | Sampling availability | Devices |
|---|---|---|
| Snapdragon; 8 Gen 1 (SM8450) | Q1 2022 | Honor Magic4, Honor Magic4 Pro, Honor Magic4 Ultimate, Honor Magic V; Vivo iQOO Neo6 (China), iQOO 9 (China), iQOO 9 Pro; Lenovo Legion Y90 • Leitz Phone 2 • Black Shark 5 Pro; Motorola Edge X30 / Edge 30 Pro / Edge+ (2022), Motorola Edge X30 PRC; Nubia Red Magic 7, Nubia Red Magic 7 Pro, Nubia Z40 Pro; OnePlus 10 Pro • Oppo Find X5 Pro • Realme GT2 Pro; Redmi K50 • Poco F4 GT (Redmi K50G in China); Redmi K50 (Mercedes-AMG PETRONAS Formula One Team Edition); Samsung Galaxy S22 (North America/China/Japan/Southeast Asia/Latin America/South Korea); Samsung Galaxy S22+ (North America/China/Japan/Southeast Asia/Latin America/South Korea); Samsung Galaxy S22 Ultra (North America/China/Japan/Southeast Asia/Latin America/South Korea); Samsung Galaxy S23 FE (North America/China/); Samsung Galaxy Tab S8, Samsung Galaxy Tab S8+, Samsung Galaxy Tab S8 Ultra; Sharp Aquos R7, Sharp Aquos R7s; Sony Xperia 1 IV, Sony Xperia 1 IV (Gaming Edition), Sony Xperia 5 IV; Vertu Metavertu (based on Nubia Z40 Pro); Vivo X80 Pro, Vivo X Fold, Vivo X Note; Xiaomi 12, Xiaomi 12 Pro; ZTE Axon 40 Ultra, ZTE A41 Ultra, ZTE A41 Ultra Premium |
| Snapdragon; 8+ Gen 1 (SM8475) | Q3 2022 | ASUS ROG Phone 6, ROG Phone 6 Pro, ZenFone 9 • BYD Yangwang U8 (cockpit); iQOO 10 (9T in India), 10 Pro, Neo7 Racing (Neo7 Pro in India), Neo8 (3.0 GHz); Honor 80 GT (3.0 GHz), 80 Pro (3.0 GHz), 80 Pro Flat (3.0 GHz), 90 Pro (3.0 GHz), X50 GT (3.0 GHz); Honor X50 Pro (3.0 GHz), X60 GT (3.2 GHz), Magic Vs (3.0 GHz), Magic Vs Ultimate, Magic Vs2 (3.0 GHz); Huawei Mate 50 (4G-only), Mate 50 Pro (4G-only), Mate 50 RS (Porsche Design) (4G-only); Huawei Mate X3 (4G-only), Mate X3 (Premium Edition) (4G-only), P60 (3.0 GHz) (4G-only), Huawei P60 Pro (4G-only), P60 Art (4G-only) • Lenovo Legion Y70, Legion Y700 (2023, Legion Tab in India); Motorola Edge 30 Ultra (X30 Pro in China), ThinkPhone by Motorola, Razr (2022), Razr 40 Ultra/Razr+; Nubia Red Magic 7S, Red Magic 7S Pro, Red Magic 7S Pro Flash, Red Magic Gaming Tablet, Z40S Pro; Nothing Phone (2) (3.0 GHz), OnePlus 10T (Ace Pro in China), OnePlus 11R (Ace 2 in China); Oppo Find N2 (3.0 GHz), Reno9 Pro+ (3.0 GHz), Reno10 Pro+ (3.0 GHz), Reno11 Pro; Realme GT2 Explorer Master, GT Neo5 (3.0 GHz), GT3 (3.0 GHz); Redmi K50 Ultra, K50 (Mercedes-AMG PETRONAS Formula One Team Summer Edition); Redmi K60 (Poco F5 Pro outside China) (3.0 GHz), Samsung Galaxy Z Fold 4, Galaxy Z Flip 4, W23, W23 Flip; Vivo X Flip (3.0 GHz), X Fold+ • Solana Mobile Saga (OSOM OV1), Xiaomi 12S, 12S Pro, 12S Ultra, 12T Pro; Xiaomi Pad 6 Pro, Pad 6 Max 14, MIX Fold 2, ZTE Axon 50 Ultra, Axon Pad |

=== Snapdragon 8 Gen 2 (2022–2023) ===
| Model number | Sampling availability | Devices |
|---|---|---|
| Snapdragon; 8 Gen 2 (SM8550-AB) | Q4 2022 | ASUS ROG Phone 7, ROG Phone 7 Ultimate, ZenFone 10 • Ayn Odin2; Honor Magic5, Magic5 Pro, Magic5 Ultimate, Magic Vs3, 90 GT, 100 Pro; iQOO (Vivo) 11, 11 Pro, 11S, Neo9 (Neo9 Pro in India); Leitz Phone 3; Meizu 20, 20 Pro, 20 Infinity, 20 Classic, 21 Note; Motorola Edge 40 Pro (X40 Pro in China), Edge+ (2023); Nubia Pad 3D II, Red Magic 8 Pro, Red Magic 8 Pro+, Z50, Z50S, Z50 Ultra; OnePlus 11, 12R (Ace 3 in China), Ace 2 Pro, Open; Oppo Find X6 Pro, Find N3 (OnePlus Open), Find N3 (Premium Edition); Redmi K70 (Poco F6 Pro outside China), K60 Pro, K60 (Champion Edition); Sharp Aquos R8, Aquos R8 Pro, Aquos R8s, Aquos R8s Pro • Realme GT5; Sony Xperia 1 V, Xperia 5 V, PDT-FP1 • Vivo X90 Pro+, X Fold2, X Fold3; Xiaomi 13, 13 Pro, 13 Ultra, Pad 6S Pro 12.4 • ZTE Axon 60 Ultra |
| Snapdragon; 8 Gen 2 (SM8550-AC) | Q1 2023 | Snapdragon 8 Gen 2 (Leading Version); Honor Magic V2, Magic V2 Ultimate, Magic V2 RSR (Porsche Design); Nubia Red Magic 8S Pro, Red Magic 8S Pro+, Z50S Pro; Vertu Metavertu2 (based on Nubia Z50S Pro); Xiaomi MIX Fold 3 • NIO Phone N24; Snapdragon 8 Gen 2 (For Galaxy); Samsung Galaxy S23, Galaxy S23+, Galaxy S23 Ultra; Galaxy Tab S9, Galaxy Tab S9+, Galaxy Tab S9 Ultra; Galaxy Z Flip 5, Galaxy Z Fold 5, W24, W24 Flip |

=== Snapdragon 8/8s Gen 3 (2023–2024) ===
| Model number | Sampling availability | Devices |
|---|---|---|
| Snapdragon; 8s Gen 3 (SM8635) | Q1 2024 | Honor 200 Pro, MagicPad 2 12.3, Pad GT Pro 12.3 (Tablet GT Pro); iQOO Z9 Turbo (2024), Z9 Turbo L (2025); Motorola Edge 50 Ultra (Moto X50 Ultra in China), Razr 50 Ultra/Razr+ (2024); OnePlus Nord 5 (2025); Redmi Turbo 3 (Poco F6 outside China), Turbo 3 (Harry Potter Edition); Realme GT 6 (Global), GT Neo6; Sharp Aquos R9 Pro; Vivo Pad3 (iQOO Pad2) (2024), Pad5e (2025), V70 Elite (S50 in China) (2026); Xiaomi 14 Civi (Civi 4 Pro in China), Pad 7 Pro (2024) |
| Snapdragon; 8 Gen 3 (SM8650-AB) | Q4 2023 | ASUS ROG Phone 8, ROG Phone 8 Pro, ROG Phone 9 FE, ZenFone 11 Ultra; Honor 300 Pro, 300 Ultra, 400 Pro, GT, Magic V3, Magic6, Magic6 Pro, Honor Magic6 Ultimate, Magic6 RSR (Porsche Design), Pad GT2 Pro, V Flip 2; iQOO 12, 12 Pro, Neo9S Pro+, Neo10 Pro; Lenovo Legion Tab Gen 3 (2025), Legion Y700 (China 2024), Lenovo Yoga Pad Pro AI, Yoga Tab Plus (TB520FU), Yoga Tab (2025); Meizu 21, 21 Pro; NIO Phone 2; Nubia Red Magic 9 Pro, Red Magic 9 Pro+ (Bumblebee Edition), Red Magic 10 Air, Nubia Tablet Pro, Z60 Ultra, Z60 Ultra (Dragon Edition/Photographer Edition); OnePlus 12, 13R, Ace 3 Pro, Ace 5, Pad 2 (Pad Pro in China); Oppo Find X7 Ultra; Polestar Phone; Realme GT5 Pro, GT6 (China); Redmi K70 Pro, K70 Pro (Automobili Lamborghini SQUADRA CORSE), K80 (Poco F7 Pro outside China) (2024); Valve Steam Frame (2026); Vivo X100 Ultra, X Fold3 Pro (2024), X Fold5 (2025); Sony Xperia 1 VI (2024); Xiaomi 14, 14 Pro, 14 Pro Ti, 14 Pro (2023) Ti Satellite, 14 Ultra, 14 Ultra Ti (2024); MIX Flip, MIX Fold 4 (2024) |
| Snapdragon; 8 Gen 3 (SM8650-AC) | Q1 2024 | Snapdragon 8 Gen 3 (Leading Version); Nubia Red Magic 9S Pro, Red Magic 9S Pro+, Red Magic Nova; Nubia Z60 Ultra (Leading Version), Z60S Pro • Oppo Pad 3 Pro; Snapdragon 8 Gen 3 (For Galaxy); Samsung Galaxy S24 (only for US, Canada, Japan, China and Taiwan); Samsung Galaxy S24+ (only for US, Canada, Japan, China and Taiwan); Samsung Galaxy S24 Ultra, Galaxy Z Fold Special Edition; Samsung Galaxy Z Flip 6, Galaxy Z Fold 6 |

=== Snapdragon 8 Elite/8s Gen 4 (2024–2025) ===
| Model number | Sampling availability | Devices |
|---|---|---|
| Snapdragon; 8s Gen 4 (SM8735) | Q2 2025 | Honor 500 (2025), Pad 20 Pro, Magicpad 4 12.1 (2026); iQOO Z10 Turbo Pro, Neo 10 (2025); Lenovo Idea Tab Pro Gen 2 (2026); Meizu 22 (2025); Motorola Moto Pad 70 Pro (2026); Nothing Phone 3 (2025); OnePlus Turbo 6 (2026); Oppo K13 Turbo Pro (2025); Redmi Turbo 4 Pro (Poco F7 outside China) (2025); Sharp Aquos R11 (2026); Xiaomi Civi 5 Pro, Pad 8 (2025) |
| Snapdragon; 8 Elite (SM8750-AB) | Q4 2024 | ASUS ROG Phone 9, ROG Phone 9 Pro (2024), ZenFone 12 Ultra (2025); Honor Magic7, Magic7 Pro, Magic7 RSR (Porsche Design) (2024), Magic V5, 500 Pro (2025), 600 Pro, Win RT (2026); Lenovo Legion Y700 Gen 4 (2025), Legion Y900 13 (2026); Motorola Razr 60 Ultra (Razr Ultra in the US) (2025); Nubia Fold (2025), Red Magic 10 Pro (Global/China), Red Magic 10 Pro+ (2024), RedMagic X (Golden Saga) (2025), Red Magic 11 Air (2026); Nubia Z70 Ultra, Z70S Ultra, Z70S Ultra (Photographer Edition) (2025); OnePlus 13 (2024), 13s, 13T (2025), Ace 5 Pro (2024), Ace 6, Pad 2 Pro, Pad 3 (2025); Oppo Find X8 Ultra (2025), Pad 4 Pro (2025); Vivo iQOO 13 (2024), iQOO Neo11, X200 Ultra (2025); Realme GT7 Pro (GT 7 Pro outside China) (2024), GT7 Pro (Racing Edition), GT8 (2025); Redmi K80 Pro (Automobili Lamborghini SQUADRA CORSE), K80 Pro (Poco F7 Ultra outside China) (2024), K90 (Poco F8 Pro outside China) (2025), K90 Ultra (2026); Sony Xperia 1 VII (2025); Xiaomi 15, 15 Pro (2024), 15 Ultra, MIX Flip 2, Pad 8 Pro (2025) |
| Snapdragon; 8 Elite (SM8750-3-AB) | Q1 2025 | Oppo Find N5 |
| Snapdragon; 8 Elite (SM8750-AC) | Q1 2025 | Snapdragon 8 Elite (Leading Version); Honor GT Pro (2025); Nubia Red Magic 10S Pro, Red Magic 10S Pro+ (2025); Snapdragon 8 Elite (For Galaxy); Samsung Galaxy S25, Galaxy S25+, Galaxy S25 Edge, Galaxy S25 Ultra (2025); Galaxy Z Fold 7, Galaxy Z TriFold (2025) |

=== Snapdragon 8 Gen 5/8 Elite Gen 5/8 Elite Gen 5 V Series (2025-2026) ===
| Model number | Sampling availability | Devices |
|---|---|---|
| Snapdragon; 8 Gen 5 (SM8845) | Q3 2025 | Honor Magicpad3 12.3, Magicpad4, 700 Pro (2026); Lenovo Legion Y70 (2026); iQOO 15R, Z11 Turbo (2026); Motorola Edge Max, Razr Fold, Signature (2026); OnePlus 15R, Ace 6T (2025); Realme Neo8 (2026); Vivo S50 Pro mini (2025), X300 E, X300 FE (2026) |
| Snapdragon; 8 Elite Gen 5 (SM8850-AC) | Q4 2025 | Honor Magic8, Magic8 Pro, Magicpad 3 Pro 13.3 (2025), Magic8 RSR (Porsche Design), Magic V6, Magic9, Win, Win RT, Win Pad or Tablet, Robot Phone (2026); iQOO 15 (2025), 15 Ultra, Pad Pro 8.8 (2026); Nubia NaviX Ultra (2026), Red Magic 11 Pro, Red Magic 11 Pro+ (2025), RedMagic Astra 2 (2026), Z80 Ultra (2025); OnePlus 15 (2025), 15T, Pad 4 (OnePlus Pad 3 Pro and Oppo Pad 5 Pro in China), Ace 7 Pro (2026); Oppo Find N6 (7-core) Find X9 Ultra, Pad Mini, Pad 5 Pro (2026); Realme GT8 Pro (GT 8 Pro outside China) (2025), GT8 Pro (Aston Martin Formula 1 Limited Edition) (2025); Redmi K90 Pro Max (Poco F8 Ultra outside China), K90 Pro Max (Automobili Lamborghini SQUADRA CORSE) (2025), K100 Pro Max (Poco F9 Ultra outside China) (2026); Sony Xperia 1 VIII (2026); Vivo X300 Ultra, Pad6 Pro (iQOO Pad6 Pro) (2026); Xiaomi 17, 17 Max, 17 Pro, 17 Pro Max, 17 Ultra (2025); 17 Ultra Leica Edition (Leica Leitzphone powered by Xiaomi outside China) (2025), 17 Max (2026) |
| Snapdragon; 8 Elite Gen 5 V Series (SM8850-1-AB) | Q3 2026 | OnePlus Ace 7 (2026); Redmi K100 Pro (Poco F9 Pro outside China) (2026) |
| Snapdragon; 8 Elite Gen 5 (SM8850-1-AD) | Q1 2026 | Snapdragon 8 Elite (Leading Version); Lenovo Legion Y700 AI (2026); Nubia Red Magic 11S Pro, Red Magic 11S Pro+ (2026); Samsung W27 (2026); Snapdragon 8 Elite Gen 5 (For Galaxy); Samsung Galaxy S26 (only for US and China) (2026); Galaxy S26+ (only for US and China) (2026); Galaxy S26 Ultra (2026); Galaxy Z Fold 8, Galaxy Z Fold 8 Ultra (2026); Galaxy Z Flip 8 (only for US and China) (2026) |

=== Snapdragon 8 Elite Gen 6/8 Elite Extreme Gen 6 (2026) ===
| Model number | Sampling availability | Devices |
|---|---|---|
| Snapdragon 8 Elite Gen 6 (SM8950) | Q3 2026 | Xiaomi 18 Pro (2026) |
| Snapdragon 8 Elite Extreme Gen 6 (SM8975) | Q3 2026 | Xiaomi 18 Pro Max (2026); Motorola Signature 27 (2026); iQOO 16, Pad Ultra (2026); Honor Magic9 Pro Max, Win2 (2026); OnePlus 16 (2026); Nubia Red Magic 12 Pro, Red Magic 12 Pro+ (2026) |

== Mobile Compute Platforms ==
=== Snapdragon 835 and 850, 7c/7c+, 8c and 8cx ===
| Model number | Sampling availability | Devices |
|---|---|---|
| Snapdragon; 835 (MSM8998) | Q2 2018 | Asus NovaGo; AllView Allbook Q; HP Envy X2; Lenovo Miix 630; Thomson NEO Z3; Thomson NEO Z3 PRO 13.3" |
| Snapdragon; 850 (SDM850) | Q3 2018 | Huawei MateBook E (2019); Hyrican Study/ EnWo Pad One; Lenovo Yoga C630 WOS; MaiBenBen XiaoMai X228; Microsoft HoloLens2; Pipo W12; Samsung Galaxy Book2; Thomson NEO Z3 PRO 12.5" |
| Snapdragon; 7c | 2020 | Acer Chromebook 511; Acer Chromebook Spin 513; HP Chromebook x2 11; ECS LIVA QC710; JP.IK Turn Connect T101; JP.IK Leap Connect T304; Positivo Wise N1212S |
| Snapdragon; 7c Gen 2 | Q2 2021 | Asus ExpertBook B3 Detachable; HP Laptop 14; Lenovo 10w; Lenovo Ideapad Duet 5 Chromebook Gen 6; Samsung Galaxy Book Go |
| Snapdragon; 7c+ Gen 3 | Q4 2021 | Samsung Galaxy Book2 Go |
| Snapdragon; 8c | 2020 | Lenovo IdeaPad 4G/LTE |
| Snapdragon; 8cx | Q3 2019 | Lenovo Flex 5G; Lenovo IdeaPad 5G; Lenovo Yoga 5G; Samsung Galaxy Book S |
| Snapdragon; 8cx Gen 2 | Q3 2020 | Acer Spin 7; Dell Inspiron 14; HP Elite Folio; Huawei MateBook E Go LTE; Samsung Galaxy Book Go 5G; Xiaomi Book S |
| Snapdragon; 8cx Gen 3 | Q4 2021 | Huawei MateBook E Go Performance; Huawei MateBook E Go 2023 (2.69 GHz); Lenovo ThinkPad X13s; Samsung Galaxy Book2 Pro 360; Windows Dev Kit 2023 |

=== Microsoft SQ1, SQ2 and SQ3 ===
| Model number | Sampling availability | Devices |
|---|---|---|
| Microsoft SQ1 | Q3 2019 | Microsoft Surface Pro X (8 GB) |
| Microsoft SQ2 | Q3 2020 | Microsoft Surface Pro X (16 GB) |
| Microsoft SQ3 | Q4 2022 | Microsoft Surface Pro 9 |

=== Snapdragon X series ===
| Model number | Sampling availability | Devices |
|---|---|---|
| X1-26-100 | Q1 2025 | Asus Vivobook 14 (X1407Q); Asus Vivobook S14 (S3407Q); Asus Vivobook S16 (S3607Q); Asus Zenbook A14 (UX3407); HP EliteBook 6 (G1q); Lenovo IdeaCentre Mini x (01Q8X10); Lenovo IdeaPad Slim 3x (15Q8X10); Lenovo IdeaPad 5x 2-in-1 (14Q8X9); Lenovo IdeaPad Slim 5x (14Q8X9); Lenovo ThinkBook 16 Gen 7 (QOY); Lenovo ThinkCentre neo 50q (QC) |
| X1P-42-100 | Q2 2024 | Acer Swift Go 14 AI; Asus ProArt PZ13; Asus Vivobook S15 (Q5507); Asus Zenbook A14 (UX3407); Dell Inspiron 14 5441; Dell Latitude 5455; HP EliteBook Ultra; HP OmniBook 5 14; HP OmniBook X; Lenovo IdeaPad 5x 2-in-1 (14Q8X9); Lenovo IdeaPad Slim 5x (14Q8X9); Lenovo ThinkBook 16 Gen 7 (QOY); Lenovo ThinkPad T14s Gen 6 (Snapdragon); Microsoft Surface Laptop 7; Microsoft Surface Pro 12"; Samsung Galaxy Book4 Edge 15 |
| X1P-46-100 | Q2 2024 | |
| X1P-64-100 | Q2 2024 | Acer Swift 14 AI (SF14-11); Asus Vivobook S15 (S5507); Dell Inspiron 14 5441; Dell Inspiron 14 Plus 7441; Dell Latitude 5455; Dell Latitude 7455; Lenovo IdeaCentre Mini x (01Q8X10); Lenovo Yoga Slim 7x (14Q8X9); Microsoft Surface Laptop 7; Microsoft Surface Pro 11 Copilot+ (IPS) (June 2024) |
| X1P-66-100 | Q2 2024 | |
| X1E-78-100 | Q2 2024 | Acer Swift 14 AI (SF14-11); Asus Vivobook S15 (S5507); Asus Zenbook A14 (UX3407); HP EliteBook Ultra 14 (G1q); HP OmniBook X 14; Lenovo ThinkPad T14s Gen 6 (Snapdragon); Lenovo Yoga Slim 7x (14Q8X9); Medion SPRCHRGD 14 S1 Elite |
| X1E-80-100 | Q2 2024 | Dell Latitude 7455; Dell XPS 13 9345; Honor MagicBook Art 14 (Snapdragon); Microsoft Surface Laptop 7; Microsoft Surface Pro 11 Copilot+ (OLED) (July 2024); Samsung Galaxy Book4 Edge 14 / 16 |
| X1E-84-100 | Q2 2024 | Samsung Galaxy Book4 Edge 16 |
| X1E-00-1DE | Q2 2024 | |

== See also ==
- List of Qualcomm Snapdragon systems on chips
