= HTC Butterfly 3 =

Android smartphone

- Manufacturer: HTC
- Type: Smartphone
- Predecessor: HTC Butterfly 2
- Form factor: Slate
- Dimensions: 151 mm (5.9 in) H 73 mm (2.9 in) W 10 mm (0.39 in) D
- Weight: 161 g (5.7 oz)
- Operating system: Android 5.0 "Lollipop"
- System-on-chip: Qualcomm Snapdragon 810
- CPU: Quad-core ARM Cortex A57 and quad-core A53 (64-bit support)
- GPU: Adreno 430
- Memory: 3 GB LPDDR4 RAM
- Storage: 32 GB
- Removable storage: microSD up to 128 GB
- Battery: 2,700 mAh Li-Po
- Codename: B3

The HTC Butterfly 3 is an Android smartphone manufactured and marketed by HTC. The device is an international variant of the HTC J Butterfly (HTV31) which was sold only in Japan and the Butterfly 3 was first launched in Taiwan on October 20, 2015. However, HTC later on stated that the Butterfly 3 will be sold only in Taiwan.

== History ==
The J Butterfly was announced in May 2015 and the Butterfly 3 was announced along with the HTC One M9+ Supreme Camera Edition in a press conference held in Japan in September 2015. An international version was announced on 29 September 2015.
