= HTC Desire 520 =

Android smartphone

- Manufacturer: HTC
- Series: HTC Desire
- First released: August 2015; Released in November 2015
- Compatible networks: GSM 850 / 900 / 1800 / 1900, HSDPA 850 / 1900, 4G 2, 4, 5, 17
- Color: Slate Gray
- Dimensions: 139.8 x 68.9 x 9.1 mm (5.50 x 2.71 x 0.36 in)
- Operating system: Android 5.1 (Lollipop), Sense 7 UI
- System-on-chip: Qualcomm MSM8909 Snapdragon 210 (28 nm)
- CPU: Quad-core 1.1 GHz Cortex-A7
- GPU: Adreno 304
- Memory: 1GB RAM
- Storage: 8GB eMMC 4.5
- Battery: Li-Ion 2000 mAh, removable
- Rear camera: 8 MP, AF with LED flash Video: 720p@30fps
- Front camera: 2 MP; Video: 720p@30fps
- Data inputs: Accelerometer, proximity

The HTC Desire 520 is a low-end Android smartphone released by HTC in 2015. The phone received mixed reviews. CNET described the phone as "a cheap Android device that sacrifices too much". Gadget Guy noted the phone's long battery life, but also described the phone as "one of the slowest phones they have ever reviewed" and its screen quality as sub-par.
