= Nokia G300 =

2021 smartphone by Nokia

- Brand: Nokia
- Manufacturer: HMD Global
- Type: Smartphone
- Series: Nokia G series
- First released: October 19, 2021
- Availability by region: United States
- Predecessor: Nokia G20
- Compatible networks: GSM / HSPA / LTE / 5G
- Form factor: Slate
- Color: Meteor Grey
- Dimensions: 169.4×78.4×9.3 mm (6.67×3.09×0.37 in)
- Weight: 210 g (7 oz)
- Operating system: Android 11
- System-on-chip: Qualcomm Snapdragon 480 5G
- CPU: Octa-core (2×2.0 GHz Kryo 460 & 6×1.8 GHz Kryo 460)
- GPU: Adreno 619
- Memory: 4 GB RAM
- Storage: 64 GB
- Removable storage: microSDXC (expandable)
- Battery: 4470 mAh (non-removable)
- Charging: 18 W fast charging
- Rear camera: 16 MP (wide) + 5 MP (ultra-wide) + 2 MP (depth)
- Front camera: 8 MP
- Display: 6.52 in (166 mm) IPS LCD, 720 × 1600 pixels, 20:9 aspect ratio
- Sound: Loudspeaker, 3.5 mm headphone jack
- Connectivity: Wi-Fi 802.11 a/b/g/n/ac, Bluetooth 5.0, GPS, NFC, USB-C
- Model: N1374DL

Nokia G300 is an Android-based smartphone developed by Nokia Mobile, a brand licensed by HMD Global. It was announced on 12 October 2021 and released in the United States on 19 October 2021. The device is part of Nokia's G-series lineup of budget smartphones and supports 5G connectivity.

The phone was initially offered through prepaid carriers such as Tracfone and Straight Talk Wireless. At launch, the Nokia G300 was priced at approximately US$199 and positioned as one of Nokia's most affordable 5G smartphones.

== Specifications ==
=== Hardware ===
The Nokia G300 is powered by the Qualcomm Snapdragon 480 5G system-on-chip and includes 4 GB of RAM and 64 GB of internal storage, which can be expanded via a microSD card. The device features a side-mounted fingerprint sensor integrated into the power button.

The smartphone has a 6.52-inch IPS LCD display with a resolution of 720 × 1600 pixels and a 20:9 aspect ratio. The device measures approximately 169.4 × 78.4 × 9.3 mm and weighs about 210 g.

=== Camera ===
The Nokia G300 includes a triple-camera system on the rear consisting of a 16-megapixel primary camera, a 5-megapixel ultra-wide camera, and a 2-megapixel depth sensor. The front camera uses an 8-megapixel sensor for selfies and video calls.

=== Battery and connectivity ===
The device is powered by a 4,470 mAh non-removable battery and supports 18-watt fast charging. Connectivity options include 5G, LTE, Wi-Fi 802.11 a/b/g/n/ac, Bluetooth 5.0, NFC, USB-C, and a 3.5 mm headphone jack.

=== Software ===
The Nokia G300 runs Android 11 out of the box and follows Nokia Mobile's approach of providing a near-stock Android experience.

=== Availability ===
The Nokia G300 was released in the United States in October 2021 and was available primarily through prepaid carriers. The device was offered in a single color option, Meteor Grey, and a single configuration with 4 GB of RAM and 64 GB of storage.

== Development ==
The Nokia G300 was introduced as part of Nokia Mobile's G-series lineup of budget smartphones. The device was designed to offer 5G connectivity at a lower price point, targeting prepaid carrier markets in the United States.

== Reception ==
Technology publications described the Nokia G300 as an entry-level smartphone aimed at the prepaid market. Reviewers noted that the device focused on affordability and basic functionality rather than flagship-level specifications. The Verge described the phone as offering “bread-and-butter features” such as a fingerprint sensor, large battery, and headphone jack while maintaining a low price point of around US$199.

Coverage by Android Central highlighted the device as HMD Global's most affordable 5G smartphone at launch, noting its Snapdragon 480 processor, 6.52-inch display, and 4,470 mAh battery as key features for the budget segment.

Technology website TechRadar reported that the device was positioned among the least expensive 5G smartphones in the United States market, although its overall design and hardware specifications reflected its entry-level price category.
