= Motorola Edge S =

Android phones developed by Motorola Mobility

- Manufacturer: Motorola Mobility
- Series: Edge
- First released: 3 February 2021; 5 years ago
- Compatible networks: 2G EDGE, GPRS/3G HSPA, HSPA+/4G LTE, LTE+, 5G
- Form factor: Slate
- Dimensions: 168.40 mm × 74.00 mm × 9.7 mm (6.630 in × 2.913 in × 0.382 in)
- Weight: 215 g (7.6 oz)
- Operating system: Original: Android 11
- System-on-chip: Qualcomm Snapdragon 870 5G
- CPU: octa-core 3.2 GHz (1x 3.2 GHz Kryo 585 Prime + 3x 2.42 GHz Kryo 585 Gold + 4x 1.8 GHz Kryo 585 Silver)
- GPU: Adreno 640
- Model: XT2125-4

The Motorola Edge S is an Android smartphones developed by Motorola Mobility, a subsidiary of Lenovo.

== Specifications ==
The Motorola Edge S uses the Snapdragon 870G processor with the Adreno 640 GPU. It has up to 8 GB RAM and 256 GB storage options which can be further expanded by adding a microSD card. It has a 6.7 in (170 mm) LCD display with a resolution of 2520×1080 pixels and a refresh rate of 90 Hz. It has a battery capacity of 5000 mAh with a support of 20 W fast charge. It has 3.5 mm jack with a loudspeaker. The main camera set up at the back is a triple camera combination one with a wide 64 MP, other with an ultrawide 16 MP, and one more with 2 MP depth. The front camera is dual camera set up one with a wide 16 MP wide, and other with an ultrawide 8 MP. Motorola Edge S launched with Android 11 installed, and can be upgraded to Android 12.
