= Huawei M835 =

Android smartphone manufactured by Huawei

The Huawei M835 is an Android smartphone manufactured by Huawei and sold by MetroPCS. It was also known as C8500 or C8511.

It was released in July 2011 and is almost the same size as Huawei Ideos U8150, but uses a different chipset. It also differs from that model by working on CDMA networks rather than GSM, and custom ROMs are not interchangeable between them.
