= Xiaomi Mi 8 SE =

Android smartphone developed by Xiaomi

- Manufacturer: Xiaomi
- Type: Smartphone
- First released: May 31, 2018
- Availability by region: June 8, 2018
- Successor: Xiaomi Mi 9 SE
- Related: Xiaomi Mi 8 Lite
- Compatible networks: 2G, 3G, 4G LTE
- Form factor: Slate
- Colors: Gray, Blue, Red, Gold
- Weight: 5.78 oz (164 g)
- Operating system: Android 8.1 (Oreo) with MIUI 9.5 (Initial); Android 10 with MIUI 12
- System-on-chip: Qualcomm SDM710 Snapdragon 710 (10 nm)
- CPU: Octa-core (2x2.2 GHz Cortex-A75 & 6x1.7 GHz Cortex-A55)
- GPU: Adreno 616
- Memory: 4GB / 6GB
- Storage: 64GB / 128 GB
- SIM: Duo NanoSIM
- Battery: 3120 mAh
- Rear camera: 12 MP, f/1.9, 1/2.55", 1.4µm, dual pixel PDAF; 5 MP, f/2.0, (depth)
- Front camera: 20 MP, f/2.0, (wide), 1/3", 0.9µm
- Display: Super AMOLED, HDR; 5.88 inches, 87.6 cm2 (~81.3% screen-to-body ratio); 1080 x 2244 pixels, 18.7:9 ratio (~423 ppi density)
- Sound: loudspeaker
- Connectivity: Wi-Fi, GPS, GLONASS, Galileo, BeiDou, QZSS
- Data inputs: USB 2.0 Type C, 3.5mm audio jack

The Xiaomi Mi 8 SE is a mid-range Android smartphone manufactured and released in May 2018 by Xiaomi, along with the Mi 8 and the Mi 8 Explorer Edition in Shenzhen, China. It was launched on June 8, 2018 and also released to commemorate its 8th-year anniversary.

The Mi 8 SE was initially launched on Android 8.1 Oreo with the MIUI 9.5 UI. The phone received multiple software updates:

- In August 2018, the Mi 8 SE was updated to the MIUI 10 UI (Android 9) along with the Mi Mix 2.
- In July 2020, the Mi 8 SE was updated to the MIUI 12 UI (Android 10) along with the Mi 10 Lite.
