= Nokia G50 =

2021 smartphone model

- Brand: Nokia
- Manufacturer: HMD Global
- Type: Smartphone
- Series: Nokia G series
- First released: September 2021
- Predecessor: Nokia G20
- Compatible networks: GSM / HSPA / LTE / 5G
- Form factor: Slate
- Colors: Ocean Blue, Midnight Sun
- Dimensions: 173.8×77.7×8.9 mm (6.84×3.06×0.35 in)
- Weight: 220 g (8 oz)
- CPU: Octa-core (2×2.0 GHz Kryo 460 & 6×1.8 GHz Kryo 460)
- GPU: Adreno 619
- Memory: 4 GB / 6 GB RAM
- Storage: 64 GB / 128 GB
- Removable storage: microSDXC (dedicated slot)
- Battery: 5000 mAh Li-Po (non-removable)
- Charging: 18 W wired
- Rear camera: 48 MP (wide) + 5 MP (ultrawide) + 2 MP (depth)
- Front camera: 8 MP
- Display: 6.82 in (173 mm) IPS LCD, HD+ (720 × 1560 pixels)
- Sound: Loudspeaker, 3.5 mm headphone jack
- Connectivity: Wi-Fi 802.11 a/b/g/n/ac, Bluetooth 5.0, GPS, NFC (market dependent), USB-C

The Nokia G50 is an Android smartphone developed by HMD Global under the Nokia brand. It was announced in September 2021 and is part of the company's G-series lineup.

== Hardware ==
The Nokia G50 is powered by the Qualcomm Snapdragon 480 5G system-on-chip, paired with 4 GB or 6 GB of RAM and internal storage configurations of 64 GB or 128 GB. Storage can be expanded using a microSD card.

The smartphone features a 6.82-inch IPS LCD display with HD+ resolution and a waterdrop-style notch for the front camera. The device includes a triple rear camera setup consisting of a 48-megapixel main sensor, a 5-megapixel ultra-wide sensor, and a 2-megapixel depth sensor. The front-facing camera has an 8-megapixel sensor.

The device is equipped with a 5000 mAh battery designed to provide extended usage between charges. Charging is supported through a USB-C port.

== Software ==
The Nokia G50 ships with Android 11 and uses a near-stock Android interface without extensive manufacturer customizations. HMD Global announced software support that includes operating system upgrades and regular security updates.

== Connectivity ==
The smartphone supports 5G, 4G LTE, Wi-Fi, Bluetooth, GPS, and NFC in selected regions. Additional features include a 3.5 mm headphone jack and support for Google Assistant through a dedicated hardware button.
