= LG GD880 Mini =

2010 LG multimedia feature phone

LG Mini (GD880)
- Manufacturer: LG Electronics
- Availability by region: April 2010
- Predecessor: LG KM900 (Arena)
- Compatible networks: GSM 850/900/1800/1900, UMTS 900/1200, GPRS, EDGE, HSDPA 7.2 Mbit/s, HSUPA 2 Mbit/s
- Form factor: Slate
- Dimensions: 102×47.6×10.6 mm (4.02×1.87×0.42 in)
- Weight: 99 g (3 oz)
- Operating system: Proprietary
- Memory: 330 MB Internal Flash
- Removable storage: microSD (up to 32 GB)
- Battery: Li-ion, 1000mAh
- Rear camera: 5 megapixel CMOS
- Display: 3.2", 854 x 480 pixel capacitive MultiTouch touchscreen, 256K TFT, Corning Gorilla Glass protection
- Connectivity: Wi-Fi, Bluetooth 2.1, A-GPS
- Data inputs: Capacitive Multitouch Touchscreen

LG GD880i Mini is a multimedia feature phone released by LG Electronics in April 2010. The Mini is very similar feature wise to the LG KM900 Arena with exception to the display and internal memory.

The LG Mini is a metallic cased phone with a black face plate and a silver metallic bar running across the top with the video call camera and earpiece. There are no keys on the front of the phone. On the top there is a 3.5mm stereo audio jack, microUSB port and a power/lock/unlock key. On the right there is a single volume rocker and on the left there is the microSD card slot under a metal sliding cover and a camera key at the bottom. The back is black plastic with the camera at the top and an LG logo at the bottom.

== Multimedia ==
- Records in MPEG4 up to VGA resolution.
- 5-megapixel (2560 x 1920 pixels) autofocus main camera.
