= Windows Dev Kit 2023 =

Compact desktop computer

- Codename: Project Volterra
- Developer: Microsoft
- Type: Compact desktop
- Released: October 24, 2022
- Introductory price: US$599
- Operating system: Windows 11 Pro
- System on a chip: Qualcomm Snapdragon 8cx Gen 3
- Memory: 32 GB RAM (LPDDR4X)
- Storage: 512 GB SSD
- Graphics: Qualcomm Adreno
- Connectivity: Wi-Fi 6, Bluetooth 5.1, three USB-A ports, two USB-C ports, Mini DisplayPort, Ethernet
- Dimensions: 196 mm x 152 mm x 27.6 mm (8 in x 6 in x 1.1 in)
- Weight: 960 grams (2.12 lb)
- Marketing target: Software developers

Windows Dev Kit 2023 (also known as Project Volterra) is an ARM-based compact desktop computer for software developers, developed by Microsoft. It was announced during the Build conference on May 24, 2022, and was released on October 24, 2022.

Windows Dev Kit 2023 came pre-loaded with Windows 11 Pro and features a Qualcomm Snapdragon 8cx Gen 3 system-on-a-chip (SoC), 32 GB LPDDR4X RAM, 512 GB NVMe SSD, Wi-Fi 6, Bluetooth 5.1, three USB-A, two USB-C (with DisplayPort Alternate Mode support), one Mini DisplayPort (with HBR2 support), and one physical Gigabit Ethernet port (embedded USB). It can support up to three external monitors simultaneously. The USB-C ports provide USB-PD but the device itself cannot be powered by them. The device's shell design is "made with 20% recycled ocean plastic".

Windows Dev Kit 2023 contains a neural processing unit (NPU), enabling developers "to run hardware-accelerated AI tasks and machine learning workloads".

== Development ==
The Windows Dev Kit 2023 was developed by the Microsoft Surface and Qualcomm as the first developer kit for Windows on ARM. The internals of the device are based on that of the Surface Pro 9 with 5G. Unlike the ARM version of the Surface Pro, the System on a chip is the Qualcomm Snapdragon 8cx Gen 3 rather than Microsoft's customized Microsoft SQ3.

== Availability ==
The device was released on October 24, 2022, in Australia, Canada, China, France, Germany, Japan, the United Kingdom, and the United States.
