= Alcatel One Touch 980 =

Smartphone manufactured by TCL Communication

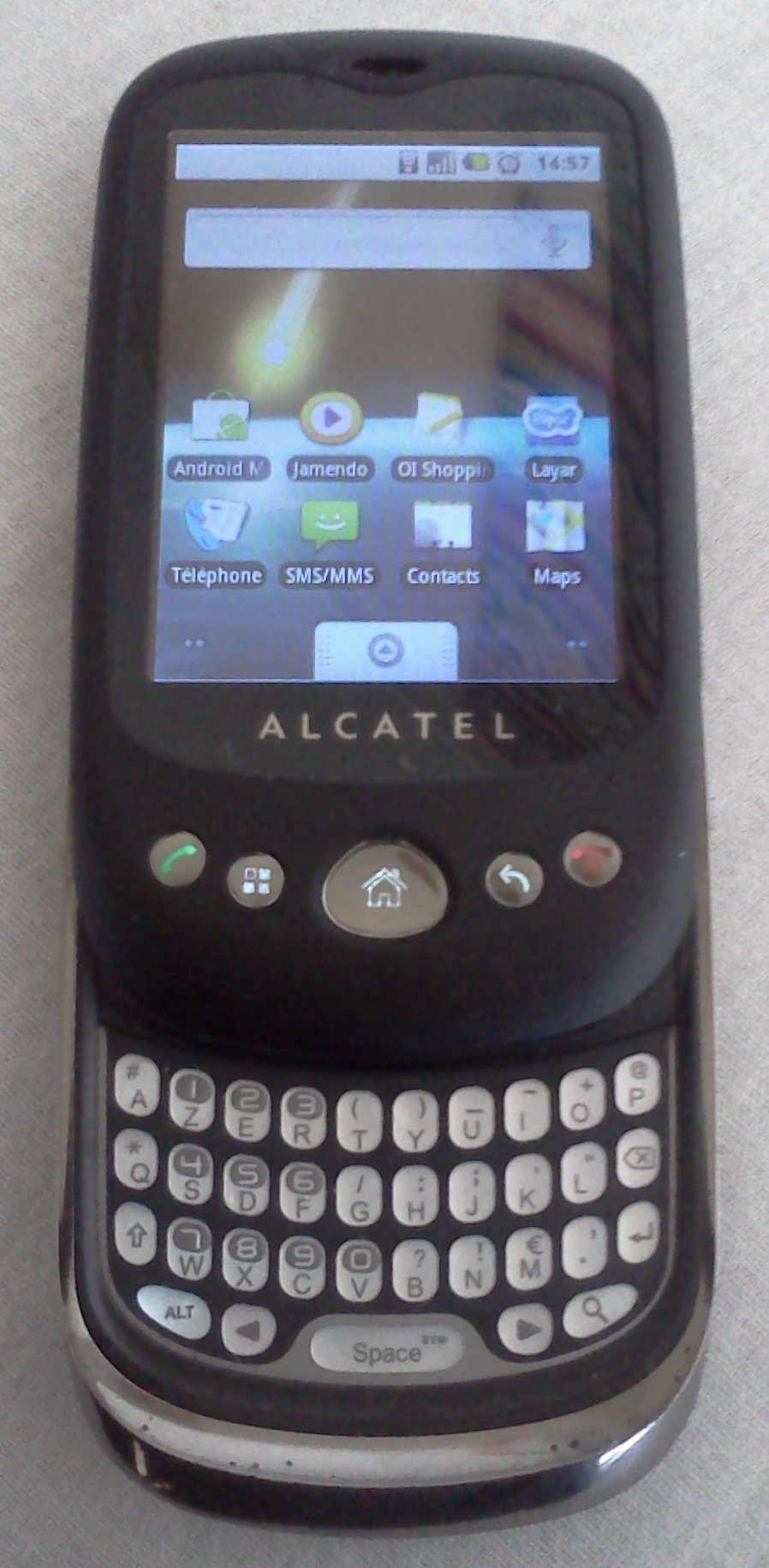
- Manufacturer: TCL Communication
- Type: Touchscreen smartphone
- Series: One Touch
- First released: United Kingdom; 24 August 2010; 15 years ago
- Availability by region: Launch date dependent on country, beginning August 2010
- Form factor: Slider
- Dimensions: 112.5 mm (4.43 in) (h); 60.4 mm (2.38 in) (w); 15.9 mm (0.63 in) (d)
- Weight: 152 g (5.4 oz)
- Operating system: Android 2.1 (Éclair)
- CPU: Qualcomm 600 MHz CPU (MSM7227 ARM11 processor)
- Memory: 256 MB
- Storage: 512 MB EEPROM (only 194 MB accessible)
- Removable storage: microSD card (up to 32 GB)
- Battery: 1150 mAh; Internal rechargeable lithium-ion battery, 8 hours talk time and 400 hours stand-by time User replaceable
- Rear camera: 2 megapixels
- Display: 2.8 in (71 mm) touchscreen, 320x240 QVGA LCD
- Connectivity: Wi-Fi 802.11b/g; Bluetooth v2.0 with A2DP; micro USB 2.0, 3.5 mm TRRS
- Data inputs: Resistive touchscreen QWERTY keyboard A-GPS; Accelerometer; Magnetometer
- SAR: 0.531 W/kg (head); 0.967 W/kg (body)
- References: "Alcatel OT-980 specs". Phone Arena. 1 September 2010.

The Alcatel One Touch 980 (stylized as one touch 980 and commonly abbreviated as Alcatel OT-980) is a touchscreen slider smartphone manufactured by TCL Communication. The phone was announced on February 15, 2010 at the Mobile World Congress. The Alcatel One Touch 980 was the first Alcatel to run the Android operating system, running version 2.1 "Éclair". The phone has been noted to resemble the Palm Prē.

== Reception ==
The One Touch 980 has been met with mixed reviews. CNET UK awarded the phone 2.5 out of 5 stars, praising the phone for its budget price, QWERTY keyboard and decent performance but criticizing the screen sensitivity and how outdated the user interface felt. TechRadar gave the phone 3 out of 5 stars, praising its battery life but criticizing the camera and the phone's thickness.
