= Xiaomi Pad 6 =

Android tablet developed by Xiaomi

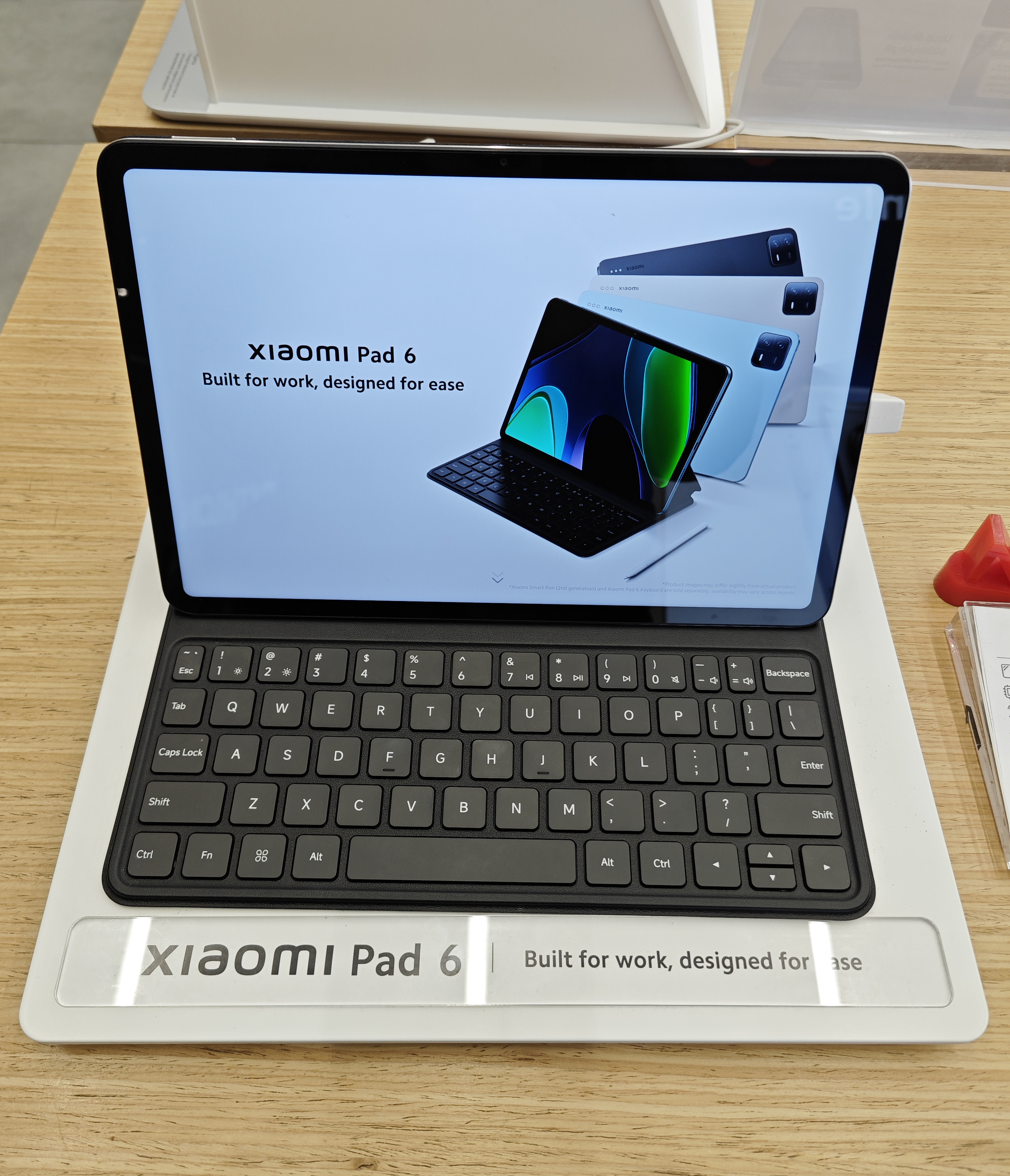
- Xiaomi Pad 6 displayed with Keyboard attachment in a showroom
- Manufacturer: Xiaomi
- Type: Tablet
- Series: Xiaomi Pad Series
- First released: April 18, 2023; 3 years ago
- Predecessor: Xiaomi Pad 5
- Related: Xiaomi Pad 6S Pro 12.4
- Dimensions: 254 x 165.2 x 6.5 mm (10.0 x 6.50 x 0.26 in)(Pad 6/Pro); 318.6 x 206.1 x 6.5 mm (12.54 x 8.11 x 0.26 in)(Pad 6 Max 14)
- Weight: 490 g (17 oz) (Pad 6/Pro) 750g (Pad 6 Max 14)
- Operating system: Android 13 based MIUI 14 upgradeable to Android 14 based Xiaomi HyperOS
- System-on-chip: Qualcomm Snapdragon 870 (Pad 6), Qualcomm Snapdragon 8+ Gen 1 (Pad 6 Pro, Pad 6 Max 14)
- CPU: Octa-core (1x3.2 GHz Kryo 585 & 3x2.42 GHz Kryo 585 & 4x1.80 GHz Kryo 585)(Pad 6); Octa-core (1x3.19 GHz Cortex-X2 & 3x2.75 GHz Cortex-A710 & 4x1.80 GHz Cortex-A510)(Pad 6 Pro, Pad 6 Max 14)
- GPU: Adreno 650 (Pad 6), Adreno 730 (Pad 6 Pro, Pad 6 Max 14)
- Memory: 6/8GB (Pad 6), 8/12GB (Pad 6 Pro), 8/12/16GB(Pad 6 Max 14) LPDDR5
- Storage: 128/256GB(Pad 6), 128/256/512GB (Pad 6 Pro), 256/512GB and 1TB (Pad 6 Max 14) UFS 3.1
- Removable storage: Not Supported
- SIM: Not supported
- Battery: 8840mAh(Pad 6), 8600 mAh (Pad 6 Pro), 10000 mAh (Pad 6 Max 14)
- Charging: Xiaomi Pad 6: 33W MI Turbo Charge Xiaomi Pad 6 Pro/Max 14: 67W Mi Turbo Charge
- Rear camera: Pad 6:13 MP, f/2.2, PDAF; Pad 6 Pro/Max 14: 50 MP, f/1.8, (wide), 1/2.76", 0.64µm, PDAF; 2 MP, f/2.4, (depth)
- Front camera: 8 MP, f/2.2, 1/4", 1.12µm(Pad 6); 20 MP, f/2.2, (wide), 1/3.4", 0.8µm(Pad 6 Pro/Max 14)
- Display: Pad 6/Pro:IPS LCD, 1B colors, 144Hz, HDR10, Dolby Vision, 550 nits 11.0 inches, 350.9 cm2 (~83.6% screen-to-body ratio); 1800 x 2880 pixels, 16:10 ratio (~309 ppi density); Corning Gorilla Glass 3 Pad 6 Max 14:IPS LCD, 1B colors, 120Hz, HDR10, Dolby Vision, 600 nits (peak); 14.0 inches, 573.0 cm2 (~87.3% screen-to-body ratio); 1800 x 2880 pixels, 16:10 ratio (~242 ppi density)
- Connectivity: Wi-Fi 802.11 a/b/g/n/a/6, dual-band, Wi-Fi Direct Bluetooth 5.2 USB Type-C 3.2, accessory connector, DisplayPort Out
- Data inputs: USB Type-C 3.1, Fingerprint Sensor(Pro and Max only), Keyboard Support, Magnetic Xiaomi Smart Pen Gen 2
- Codename: Xiaomi Pad 6: pipa Xiaomi Pad 6 Pro: liuqin Xiaomi Pad 6 Max 14: yudi
- Development status: Supported
- Website: https://www.mi.com/global/product/xiaomi-pad-6

The Xiaomi Pad 6 is a line of mid-range to high end tablets manufactured by Xiaomi. These 3 tablets were introduced in China in 2023 while Xiaomi Pad 6 was released globally as well. All these tablets are equipped with Qualcomm's 8 Series Snapdragon Chipset. A newer version, Xiaomi Pad 6S Pro 12.4 was also released in 2024 which packs better specifications and bigger display for the Global Markets. With these tablets, Xiaomi also released accessories like Folio Case, Keyboard attachment as well as Xiaomi's 2nd Generation Smart Pen.

The tablets also received update to Xiaomi's new Xiaomi HyperOS based on Android 14 in 2024.
