= ZTE Skate =

Android-based smartphone

- Manufacturer: ZTE
- Type: Slate smartphone
- First released: September 2011
- Dimensions: 127.6 mm (5.02 in) H 68 mm (2.7 in) W 9.8 mm (0.39 in) D
- Weight: 148 g (5.2 oz)
- Operating system: Android 2.3
- CPU: Qualcomm MSM7227-1-Turbo 800 MHz processor with Adreno 200 GPU
- Memory: 512 MB RAM
- Storage: 512 MB NAND; 2 GB microSD memory card (SD 2.0 compatible) microSD slot: supports up to 32 GB
- Battery: 1400 mAh; Internal rechargeable lithium-ion battery
- Rear camera: 5.0 megapixel with auto focus
- Display: 480 × 800 px, 4.3 in (110 mm), WVGA, TFT LCD capacitive touchscreen
- Connectivity: Wi-Fi (802.11 b/g), Bluetooth 2.1+EDR, GSM 850 900 1800 1900 MHz HSPA/WCDMA 900 2100 MHz, GPS
- Data inputs: Multi-touch capacitive touchscreen display, 3-axis accelerometer, digital compass, proximity and ambient light sensors
- Other: Proximity sensor, accelerometer, FM radio, compass, GPS, A-GPS.

The ZTE Skate (also marketed as ZTE V960 in China) is a phone manufactured by China's ZTE Corporation for the Android platform. It went on sale in March 2011 in Europe as the Orange Monte Carlo locked to the Orange network. There is also an upgrade version named ZTE U960 with 1 GHz processor and allowing use of the WCDMA and TD-SCDMA dual-card dual-standard.

== See also ==
- List of Android smartphones
