= Vivo V9 =

2018 Android smartphone from Vivo

- Brand: Vivo Communication Technology Co
- Manufacturer: Vivo Communication Technology Co
- Type: Touchscreen Smartphone
- First released: April 2018
- Predecessor: Vivo V7+
- Successor: Vivo V11
- Compatible networks: 2G, 3G, 4G LTE
- Dimensions: 154.80×75.00×7.90 cm (60.94×29.53×3.11 in)
- Weight: 150 g (5 oz)
- Operating system: Android 8.1 Oreo with Funtouch OS 4.0
- System-on-chip: Qualcomm Snapdragon 450 (V9 Indonesia); Qualcomm Snapdragon 626 (Global)
- CPU: Octa-core 2.2 GHz Cortex-A53 (Global)
- GPU: Adreno 506
- Memory: 4 GB RAM
- Storage: 64 GB
- Removable storage: microSD, up to 256 GB
- Battery: Non-removable Li-Ion 3260 mAh battery
- Rear camera: 13MP + 2MP (Indonesia); 16MP + 5MP (Global)
- Front camera: 24MP
- Display: 6.3 inch Full HD+

Vivo V9 is an Android smartphone developed by Vivo Communication Technology Co. It was initially released in April 2018.The phone has 64 GB of internal storage and 4 GB of RAM. A microSD card can be inserted for up to an additional 256 GB. The phone has an Octa-core 2.2 GHz Cortex-A53 CPU and an Adreno 506 GPU.

== Specifications ==
=== Software ===
As of June 2019, this smartphone comes with Android 8.1 (Oreo) with FunTouch OS developed by Vivo. The FunTouch OS is an enhanced version of Android designed to give an easier user experience for larger smartphones.

=== Hardware ===
The Vivo V9 has 64 GB of internal storage, 4 GB of RAM, and up to an additional 256 GB via microSD. The rear-facing camera has a resolution of 16 MP and also an 5 MP secondary camera for depth effect, front-facing camera comes with 24 MP(f2.0). The phone has an octa-core 2.2 GHz Cortex-A53 CPU and an Adreno 506 GPU. 1

=== Variant ===
Version	V9 Youth (Indonesia V9) (Y85)	V9 (Global)	6 GB version
Processor	Qualcomm Snapdragon 450	Qualcomm Snapdragon 626	Qualcomm Snapdragon 660
Memory	32 GB + 4 GB; 64 GB + 4 GB	64 GB + 4 GB	64 GB + 6 GB
Rear Camera	16 MP + 2 MP; 13 MP + 2 MP (China only)	16 MP + 5 MP	13 MP + 2 MP
Front Camera	16 MP	24 MP	12 MP

== History ==
Vivo V9 was first released in India in April 2019.

== Reviews ==
The phone has been described as overhyped but also a "great midrange smartphone".
