= Lenovo Vibe K5 =

Lenovo smartphone released in June 2016

- Brand: Lenovo
- Type: Smartphone
- First released: June 13, 2016
- Compatible networks: 2G; 3G; 4G
- Dimensions: 142×71×8 mm (5.59×2.80×0.31 in)
- Weight: 142 g (5.01 oz)
- Operating system: Android 5.1 (Lollipop)
- System-on-chip: Qualcomm Snapdragon 415
- CPU: Octa-core (4x1.5 GHz Cortex-A53 & 4x1.2 GHz Cortex-A53)
- GPU: Adreno 405
- Memory: 2 GB RAM
- Storage: 16 GB internal storage, eMMC 4.5
- Removable storage: microSDHC card (dedicated slot)
- SIM: Dual SIM (Micro-SIM, dual stand-by)
- Battery: Capacity: 2750 mAh; Type: Li-ion, removable
- Rear camera: Single camera: 13 MP, f/2.2 Features: LED flash, HDR, panorama Video: 1080p @ 30fps
- Front camera: Single camera: 5 MP, f/2.8
- Display: Type: IPS LCD; Size: 5.0 inches, 68.9 cm²; Resolution: 720 x 1280 pixels; Ratio: 16:9; PPI density: ~294 ppi
- Sound: Stereo speakers; 3.5 mm jack
- Connectivity: Wi-Fi: Wi-Fi 802.11 b/g/n, Wi-Fi hotspot; Bluetooth: Bluetooth 4.1, A2DP, LE; GPS: Yes, with A-GPS; NFC: No; Radio: FM Radio; USB: microUSB 2.0, USB On-The-Go
- Data inputs: Sensors: Accelerometer; Proximity sensor
- Model: A6020a40
- Development status: Discontinued

The Lenovo Vibe K5 is an Android-based smartphone released on June 13, 2016, by Lenovo. It has 13 MP rear camera and 5 MP front camera. It has 2 GB RAM and 16 GB internal storage.

== Specifications ==
=== Cameras ===
The Lenovo Vibe K5 has a 13 MP (f/2.2) single rear camera. It also has a LED Flash, and it also supports HDR and Panorama. It can record video in 1080p @ 30fps. It also has a 5 MP (f/2.8) single front camera.

=== Battery ===
The Lenovo Vibe K5 has a 2750 mAh Li-ion removable battery.

=== Display ===
The Lenovo Vibe K5 has a 5.0 inch IPS LCD with a resolution of 720 x 1280 pixels. Its ratio is 16:9 and ppi density is 294 ppi.

=== Operating System ===
The Lenovo Vibe K5 has Android 5.1 (Lollipop) Operating System.

=== CPU ===
The Lenovo Vibe K5 has Qualcomm Snapdragon 415 chipset and Octa-core (4x1.5 GHz Cortex-A53 & 4x1.2 GHz Cortex-A53) CPU. It also has Adreno 405 GPU.

=== Memory ===
The Lenovo Vibe K5 has 2 GB RAM and 16 GB (eMMC 4.5) internal storage.

=== Sound ===
The Lenovo Vibe K5 has stereo speakers and 3.5 mm jack.

=== Connectivity ===
The Lenovo Vibe K5 supports Wi-Fi 802.11 b/g/n, Wi-Fi Hotspot, Bluetooth 4.1, GPS (with A-GPS), FM Radio, microUSB 2.0 and USB On-The-Go. It also supports 2G, 3G and 4G networks.

=== Body ===
The Lenovo Vibe K5 has Glass front, aluminum/plastic back and aluminum frame. Its weight is 142 g (5.01 oz). Its dimensions are 142 mm x 71 mm x 8 mm. Its colors are Champagne Gold and Platinum Silver.

=== Sensors ===
The Lenovo Vibe K5 has an Accelerometer and a Proximity sensor.

== See also ==
- Lenovo Vibe K4 Note
- Lenovo
- Android (operating system)
