= Huawei Ideos X3 =

2011 Android smartphone

Huawei U8510 IDEOS X3
- Brand: Huawei
- Developer: Huawei
- Manufacturer: Huawei
- Type: Smartphone
- Series: IDEOS
- First released: Singapore June 2, 2011; 15 years ago
- Compatible networks: GSM / HSPA
- Form factor: Slate
- Colors: Black; Silver; Red
- Dimensions: 110 mm (4.3 in) H 56.5 mm (2.22 in) W 11.2 mm (0.44 in) D
- Weight: 104 g (3.7 oz)
- Operating system: Android 2.3 (Gingerbread)
- System-on-chip: Qualcomm MSM7227 Snapdragon S1
- CPU: 600 MHz ARM 11
- GPU: Adreno 200
- Memory: 256 MB RAM
- Storage: 512 MB
- Removable storage: microSDHC (dedicated slot)
- SIM: Mini-SIM
- Battery: Removable Li-Po 1200 mAh battery
- Rear camera: 3.15 MP
- Front camera: No
- Display: TFT, 3.2 inches, 320 x 480 pixels
- Model: U8510-0

The Huawei Ideos X3 is an Android touchscreen smartphone developed and manufactured by Huawei. It was unveiled on February 15, 2011, at MWC 2011 in Barcelona and released in July 2011 in Singapore.

It features a 3.2-inch TFT display, an Adreno 200 graphics processor, and a 3.2-megapixel rear-facing camera and a VGA front camera.
