= HTC Butterfly 2 =

Smartphone manufactured by HTC

The HTC Butterfly 2 is an Android smartphone released by HTC in 2014.

Kevin Nether of Android Authority called it "basically the One (M8) in a plastic body", praising its dust and water resistance but not its relatively low build quality. Aloysius Low of CNET described it as "one of [HTC]'s best smartphones".
