= Slow motion =

Effect in filmmaking

Slow motion video of a glass cup smashing on a concrete floor

A hovering drone in slow motion.

Slow motion (commonly abbreviated as slow-mo or slo-mo) is an effect in film-making whereby time appears to be slowed down. It was invented by the Austrian priest August Musger in the early 20th century. This can be accomplished through the use of high-speed cameras and then playing the footage produced by such cameras at a normal rate like 30 fps, or in post production through the use of software.

Typically this style is achieved when each film frame is captured at a rate much faster than it will be played back. When replayed at normal speed, time appears to be moving more slowly. A term for creating slow motion film is overcranking which refers to hand cranking an early camera at a faster rate than normal (i.e. faster than 24 frames per second). Slow motion can also be achieved by playing normally recorded footage at a slower speed. This technique is more often applied to video subjected to instant replay than to film. A third technique uses computer software post-processing to fabricate digitally interpolated frames between the frames that were shot. Motion can be slowed further by combining techniques, such as for example by interpolating between overcranked frames. The traditional method for achieving super-slow motion is through high-speed photography, a more sophisticated technique that uses specialized equipment to record fast phenomena, usually for scientific applications.

Slow motion is ubiquitous in modern filmmaking. It is used by a diverse range of directors to achieve diverse effects. Some classic subjects of slow-motion include:

- Athletic activities of all kinds, to demonstrate skill and style.
- To recapture a key moment in an athletic game, typically shown as a replay.
- Natural phenomena, such as a drop of water hitting a glass.

Slow motion can also be used for artistic effect, to create a romantic or suspenseful aura or to stress a moment in time. Vsevolod Pudovkin, for instance, used slow motion in a suicide scene in his 1933 film The Deserter, in which a man jumping into a river seems sucked down by the slowly splashing waves. Another example is Face/Off, in which John Woo used the same technique in the movements of a flock of flying pigeons. The Matrix made a distinct success in applying the effect into action scenes through the use of multiple cameras, as well as mixing slow-motion with live action in other scenes. Japanese director Akira Kurosawa was a pioneer using this technique in his 1954 movie Seven Samurai. American director Sam Peckinpah was another classic lover of the use of slow motion. The technique is especially associated with explosion effect shots and underwater footage.

The opposite of slow motion is fast motion. Cinematographers refer to fast motion as undercranking since it was originally achieved by cranking a handcranked camera slower than normal. It is often used for comic, or occasional stylistic effect. Extreme fast motion is known as time lapse photography; a frame of, say, a growing plant is taken every few hours; when the frames are played back at normal speed, the plant is seen to grow before the viewer's eyes.

The concept of slow motion may have existed before the invention of the motion picture: the Japanese theatrical form Noh employs very slow movements.

== How slow motion works ==
There are two ways in which slow motion can be achieved in modern cinematography. Both involve a camera and a projector. A projector refers to a classical film projector in a movie theater, but the same basic rules apply to a television screen and any other device that displays consecutive images at a constant frame rate.

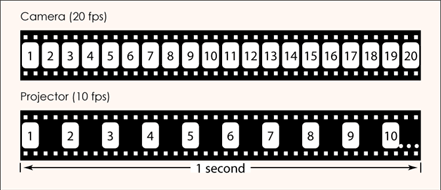

=== Overcranking ===
For purposes of making the above illustration readable, a projection speed of 10 frames per second (fps) has been selected (the 24 fps film standard makes slow overcranking rare but nevertheless available on professional equipment).

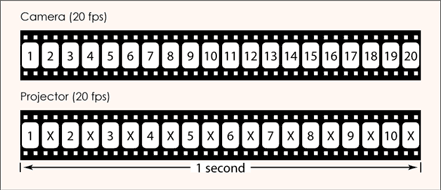
Frames marked with an X must be fabricated.

=== Time stretching ===
The second type of slow motion is achieved during post production. This is known as time-stretching or digital slow motion. This type of slow motion is achieved by inserting new frames in between frames that have actually been photographed. The effect is similar to overcranking as the actual motion occurs over a longer time.

Since the necessary frames were never photographed, new frames must be fabricated. Sometimes the new frames are simply repeats of the preceding frames but more often they are created by interpolating between frames. (Often this motion interpolation is, effectively, a short dissolve between still frames). Many complicated algorithms exist that can track motion between frames and generate intermediate frames within that scene. It is similar to half-speed, and is not true slow-motion but merely a longer display of each frame.

== In action films ==
Speed ramping 120 fps

Slow motion is used widely in action films for dramatic effect, as well as the famous bullet-dodging effect, popularized by The Matrix. Formally, this effect is referred to as speed ramping and is a process whereby the capture frame rate of the camera changes over time. For example, if in the course of 10 seconds of capture, the capture frame rate is adjusted from 60 frames per second to 24 frames per second, when played back at the standard film rate of 24 frames per second, a unique time-manipulation effect is achieved. For example, someone pushing a door open and walking out into the street would appear to start off in slow motion, but in a few seconds later within the same shot the person would appear to walk in "real-time" (everyday speed). The opposite speed-ramping is done in The Matrix when Neo re-enters the Matrix for the first time to see the Oracle. As he comes out of the warehouse "load-point", the camera zooms into Neo at normal speed but as it gets closer to Neo's face, time seems to slow down, perhaps visually accentuating Neo pausing and reflecting a moment, and perhaps alluding to future manipulation of time itself within the Matrix later on in the movie.

== In broadcasting ==
Slow-motion is widely used in sport broadcasting and its origins in this domain extend back to the earliest days of television, one example being the European Heavyweight Title in 1939 where Max Schmeling knocked out Adolf Heuser in 71 seconds.

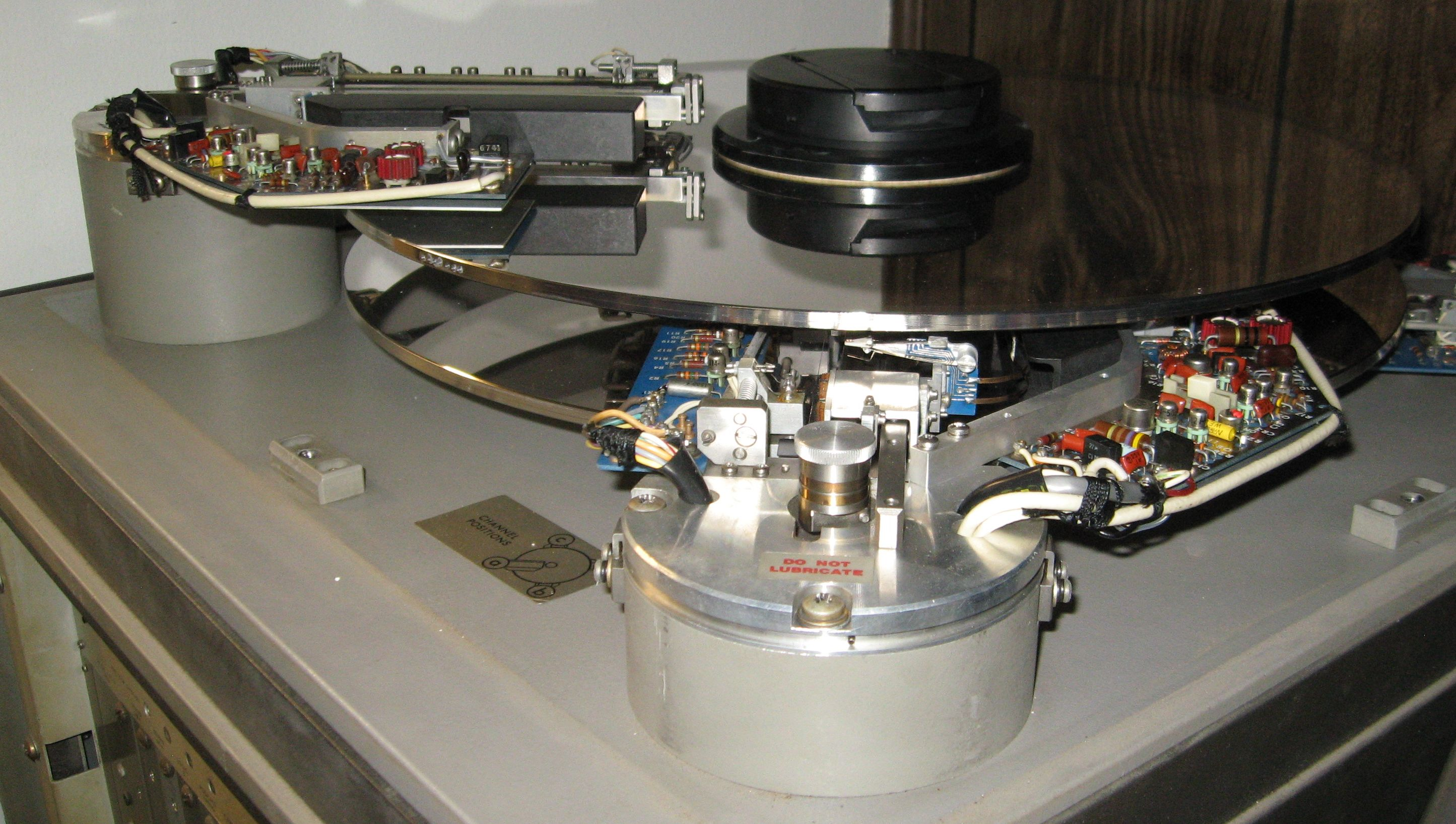
HS-100 at DC Video

In instant replays, slow motion reviews are now commonly used to show in detail some action (photo finish, goal, ...). Generally, they are made with video servers and special controllers. The first TV slo-mo was the Ampex HS-100 disk record-player. After the HS-100, Type C videotape VTRs with a slow-motion option were used. There were a few special high-frame-rate TV systems (300 fps) made to give higher-quality slow motion for TV. 300 fps can be converted to both 50 and 60 fps transmission formats without major issues.

== Scientific use ==
leafcutter bee taking flight from Great Valley gumplant. Its left pair of wings have not hooked together resulting in the hind wing not contributing to lift and the bee holding its legs to the right.

In scientific and technical applications it is often necessary to slow motion by a very large factor, for example to examine the details of a nuclear explosion. Examples are sometimes published showing, for example, a bullet bursting a balloon.

== Video file recording methods ==
Usually, digital camcorders (including: bridge cameras, DSLM, higher-end compact cameras and mobile phones) historically had two ways of storing slow motion video (or: high framerate video) into the video file: the real-time method and the menial method.

=== Real-time method ===
The real-time method treats the video as a normal video while encoding it. The output video file contains the same frame rate as the image sensor output framerate. The duration of the video in the output file also matches the real-life recording duration. And the output video also contains an audio track, like usual videos.

This method is used by all GoPro cameras, Sony RX10/RX100 series cameras (except in the time-limited "super-slow-motion" High Frame Rate (HFR) mode), Apple iPhones with high framerate (slow motion) video recording functionality (starting with the iPhone 5s in late 2013), Sony Xperia flagships since 2014 (Xperia Z2, first Sony flagship with precluded 120fps video recording), LG V series mobile phones and every Samsung Galaxy flagship phone since 2015 (Galaxy S6) for videos with 120 fps or higher.

Every video camera that is able to record at 60 fps (e.g. Asus PadFone 2 (late 2012: 720p@60 fps) and Samsung Mobile starting at the Galaxy Note 3 (late 2013) with 1080p at 60 fps, labelled "smooth motion"), recorded it using the real-time method.

Advantages

- Video editing software (e.g. Sony Vegas, Kdenlive and included software in mobile phones) and video playback software (e.g. VLC media player) allow treating such videos as both usual videos and slow-motion videos.
  - During video editing and video playback, the indicated playback speed matches real life.
  - Metadata viewing software (e.g. MediaInfo) shows a framerate and a time that matches the real-life conditions during the video recording progression.
- Video framerate and duration matches real life.
- Includes audio track, like normal framerate videos.

These advantages make the real-time method the more useful method for power users.

=== Menial method ===
The menial method saves recorded video files in a stretched way, and also without audio track. The framerate in the output file does not match the original sensor output framerate, but the former is lower. The real-life timespan of the recording (while holding the camera) does not match the length of the video in the output file, but the latter is longer. The opposite is the case for time-lapse videos, where the effectively saved framerate is lower than for normal videos

This means that the action visible inside the video runs at slower speeds than in real life, despite the indicated playback speed of ×1.

This encoding method is used by the camera software of the following devices (incomplete list):

- Panasonic Lumix DMC-FZ1000 (2014; 1080p@120fps; 1/4×)
- Samsung i8000 Omnia II GT-i8000 (2009; QVGA 320×240@120fps; 1/4×)
- Sony FDR-AX100 (2014; 720p@120fps; 1/4×)
- Sony Cyber-shot DSC-RX100 IV, V, VI and VII: High Frame Rate (HFR) mode records at 240 fps up to 1, 000 fps for 3–7 seconds. This is saved at 24 - 60 fps, i.e. from 1/4x down to 1/40x speed.
- All Samsung Galaxy flagship devices starting from late 2012 to late 2014:
  - 2012: Note II: 720×480@120fps
  - 2013 H1: S4 (800×450@120fps)
  - 2013 H1: S4 Zoom (720×480@120fps)
  - 2013 H2: Note 3 (1280×720@120fps)
  - 2014 H1: S5, K Zoom, H2: Note 4 (1280×720@120fps)
- Earlier OnePlus flagship devices (1280×720@120fps):
  - OnePlus One

Advantages

- The output video file is directly playable as slow motion in video players that do not support adjusting the playback speed (e.g. on a Samsung Galaxy S III Mini).
- The output video file is directly playable in video players and/or on devices that can only handle limited framerates (e.g. on a Samsung Galaxy S III Mini).

=== Comparison ===
Example

A 120_{FPS} video whose real-life recording duration is 00h: 00m: 10s can be encoded in the following methods seen in the table on the Samsung Galaxy Note 2, S4, Note 3, S5 and Note 4 (example devices that use the menial method for 120fps video recording).

In this example, the real-time-method recording device can be an iPhone 5s, a Galaxy S6 (including variants), a Galaxy Note 5, a Sony Xperia Z2, Xperia Z3 or Xperia Z5.

This table also includes references from other video recording types (normal, low-framerate, time-lapse) to facilitate understanding for novice people.

🎬 Encoding mode	Complies with real-time?	📹 Exemplary image sensor output framerate	Effectively saved framerate Relative to real-life time	🎞️📝 Output video file framerate	🕒🎥 Exemplary real-life recording duration	🕒📽️ Output video duration	Total number of recorded frames	🎤 Audio recorded?
🎞️ Slow-motion 1/2 (menial ×1/2)	✗	120fps	60fps (because half truncated)	30fps (60fps if no frames truncated)	00: 00: 10	00: 00: 20	600 (1200 if no frames truncated)	No 🔇
🎞️ Slow-motion 1/4 (menial ×1/4)	✗	120fps	120fps	30fps	00: 00: 10	00: 00: 40	1200	No 🔇
🎞️ Slow-motion 1/8 (menial ×1/8)	✗	120fps	120fps	15fps	00: 00: 10	00: 01: 20 (80 seconds)	1200	No 🔇
🎞️ Real-time slow-motion (Note: "Real-time slow-motion" videos can be treated as normal videos by playing it back at original 1× speed. Their high framerate could appear as additional smoothness on computer monitors that support displaying higher framerates (i.e. gaming monitors).) (HFR)	✓	120fps	120fps	120fps	00: 00: 10	00: 00: 10	1200	Yes 🔊
🎞️ Normal video (as reference)	✓	30fps (Note: Some cameras might use/offer variable frame rates, although it is less common than constant framerates.)	30fps	30fps	00: 00: 10	00: 00: 10	300	Yes 🔊
🎞️ Low-framerate (as reference) (Note: Common example for surveillance cameras. It might also be 5 fps, but 10 fps is most suitable for this example.) (Note: The video can be sped up to be viewed as a time-lapse.) (Note: Some cameras might record at lower framerates due to technical limitations, e.g. the Panasonic Lumix DMC-CM1 records 2160p@15fps instead of the usual 30fps, likely due to insufficient processing performance. On the Lumix CM1, 30fps can only be achieved at lower video resolutions such as 1080p.)	✓	10fps	10fps	10fps	00: 00: 10	00: 00: 10	100	Yes 🔊 (Note: Not all CCTV's record audio, but they do usually.)
🎞️ Time-Lapse (×4) (opposite example reference)	✗ (menial) (Note: In this example, the time lapse video gets saved in a sped-up (condensed) way, in the same way it is elongated in the menial slow motion method. One second of playback at an indicated playback speed of ×1 shows 4 seconds of real-life action.)	30fps (for digital viewfinder preview)	7.5 fps	30fps	00: 00: 10	00: 00: 02.500ms	75	No 🔇
🎞️ Time-Lapse (×8) (opposite example reference)	✗ (menial)	30fps (for digital viewfinder preview)	3.75 fps	30fps	00: 00: 10	00: 00: 01.250ms	37.5	No 🔇

== See also ==
- Motion picture terminology
- High-speed camera
- Time-lapse photography
- Bullet time
- Video server
- Multicam (LSM)
- Temporal posterization
