= Sony Xperia Z3+ =

Android smartphone by Sony Xperia

Sony Xperia Z3+ Sony Xperia Z4
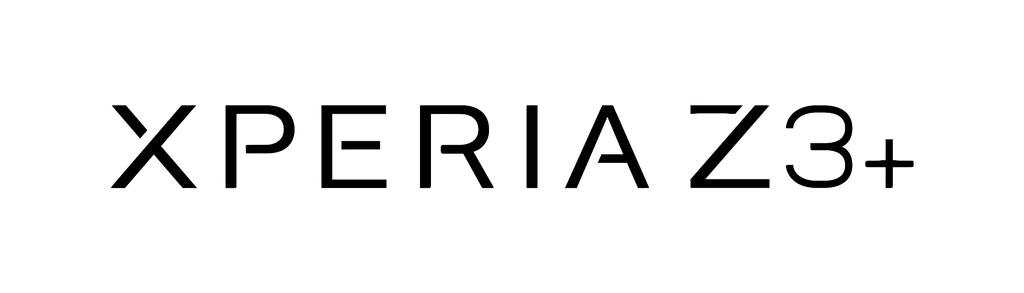

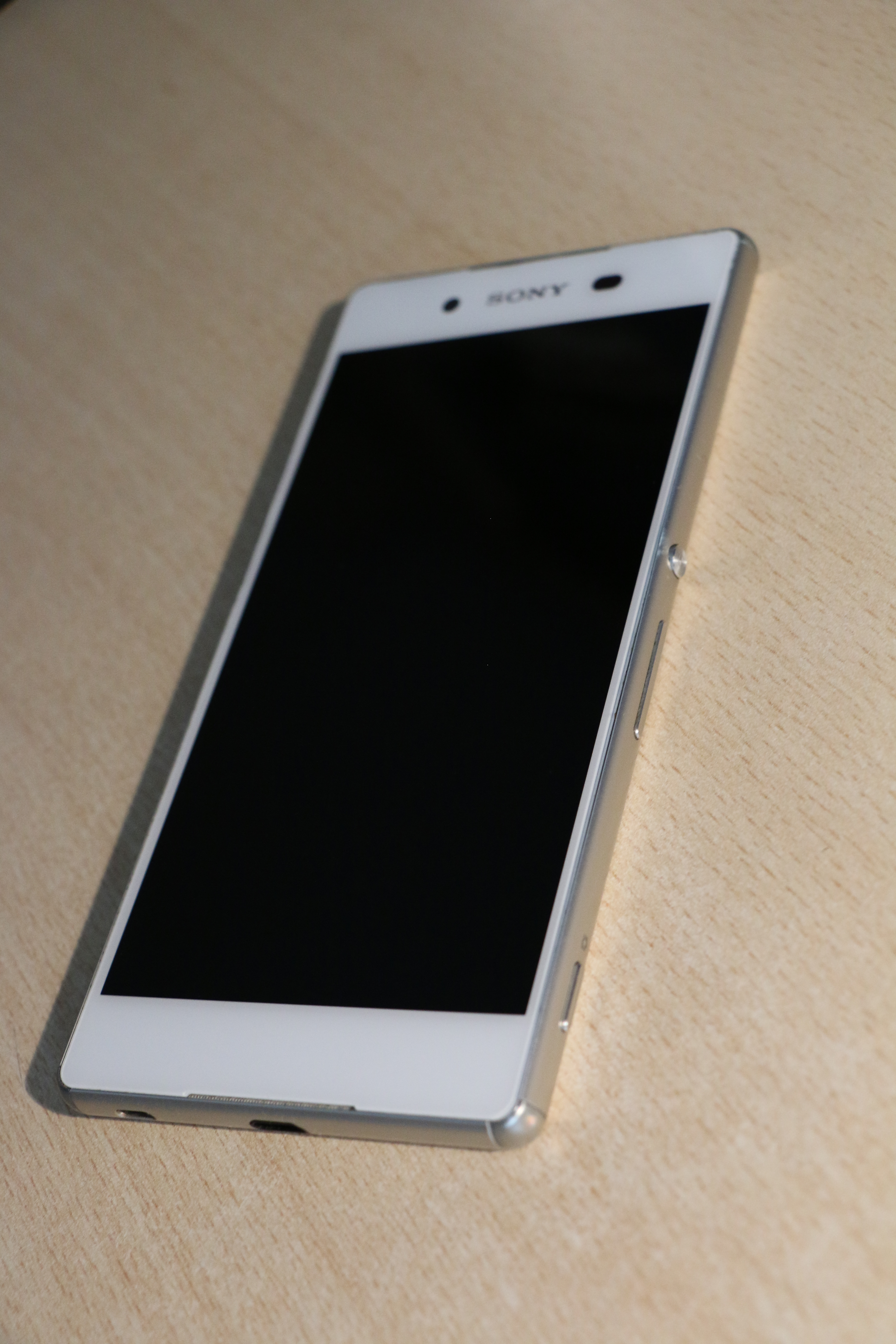
- Manufacturer: Sony Mobile Communications
- Type: Touchscreen smartphone
- Series: Xperia Z
- First released: 20 April 2015; 11 years ago (Xperia Z4); 26 May 2015; 11 years ago (Xperia Z3+); 16 June 2015; 11 years ago (Xperia Z4v)
- Availability by region: 10 June 2015; 11 years ago (Japan, SO-03G variant exclusively for NTT DoCoMo); 11 June 2015; 11 years ago (Japan, SOV31 variant exclusively for au by KDDI); 12 June 2015; 11 years ago (Hong Kong; Japan, 402SO variant exclusively for SoftBank Mobile); 15 June 2015; 11 years ago (Taiwan); 19 June 2015; 11 years ago (United Kingdom); 26 June 2015; 11 years ago (India); 5 July 2015; 11 years ago (Indonesia, Singapore, Vietnam); 27 July 2015; 11 years ago (Malaysia)
- Predecessor: Sony Xperia Z3
- Successor: Sony Xperia Z5 (Global); Sony Xperia Z4 (Japan)
- Related: Sony Xperia Z4 Tablet
- Form factor: Slate
- Dimensions: 146.3 x 71.9 x 6.9 mm (144.4 x 72.3 x 8.6mm for E6508/Z4v variant)
- Weight: 144 g (5.08 oz) (160 g (5.64 oz) for E6508/Z4v variant)
- Operating system: Android 5.0.2 "Lollipop" (launch); Android 6.0 "Marshmallow"; Android 7.0 "Nougat"; Android 7.1.1 "Nougat" (current)
- System-on-chip: Qualcomm Snapdragon 810
- CPU: Quad-core 1.5 GHz Cortex-A53 & Quad-core 2.0 GHz Cortex-A57 (2.0 GHz Qualcomm MSM8994 Octa Core)
- GPU: Adreno 430
- Memory: 3 GB
- Storage: 32 GB
- Removable storage: Up to 256 GB microSDXC
- Battery: non-user removable Li-ion 2930 mAh
- Rear camera: 20.7 MP back-side illuminated sensor, LED flash 4K (2160p) video recording @ 30 frames/s; 1080p video recording @ 60 frames/s; 720p video recording @ 120 frames/s
- Front camera: 5.1 MP (1080p video recording)
- Display: 5.2 in (130 mm) 1080p IPS LCD; Full HD 1920x1080 px TRILUMINOS™ Display with Live Color LED; X-Reality Engine for Mobile
- Connectivity: Wi-Fi; DLNA; GPS/GLONASS/BeiDou; NFC; Bluetooth 4.1; MHL 3.0; USB 2.0 (Micro-B port, USB charging, Quick Charge 2.0); USB OTG; 3.50 mm (0.138 in) headphone jack, 5 pole
- Data inputs: Multi-touch, capacitive touchscreen, proximity sensor
- Model: Xperia Z3+: E6533 (Dual-SIM), E6553; Xperia Z4: 402SO, SO-03G, SOV31; Xperia Z4v (cancelled): E6508
- Codename: Ivy (Z3+ and Z4); Aoi (Z4v)
- Other: List: Available in black, white, copper and aqua green IP65 / IP68 (Dust protected, Water jet protected & Waterproof) Digital Noise cancellation Sony Exmor R for Mobile Sony Exmor RS for Mobile Sony G Lens 1/2.3 Aperture sensor Sony BIONZ image processor SteadyShot Smile shutter SensMe TrackID Sony Entertainment Network PlayStation App Remote Play 1seg (402SO, SO-03G and SOV31 variants only) Miracast Sony Sketch Qi/PMA wireless charging (E6508/Z4v variant only) Osaifu-Keitai (402SO, SO-03G and SOV31 variants only) LISMO (SOV31 variant only) NOTTV (SO-03G variant only) POBox Plus (402SO, SO-03G and SOV31 variants only)

The Sony Xperia Z3+ (known as the Sony Xperia Z4 in Japan), and its variant, the Sony Xperia Z3+ dual, are Android smartphones that are produced by Sony. Unveiled on April 20, 2015, the phones are upgraded versions of 2014's Xperia Z3 and Xperia Z3 dual with improved specifications, a thinner body and Android 5.0 "Lollipop" respectively. The phones were awarded for the best European Multimedia Smartphone for the year 2015-2016 by European Imaging and Sound Association.

== History ==
The device was first unveiled on April 20, 2015 exclusively for release in Japan as the Xperia Z4. On May 26, 2015, Sony announced an international release for the device scheduled for June; for the international release, the device was re-marketed as the Xperia Z3+. On June 16, 2015, Sony announced the Xperia Z4v (E6508), a variant of the Xperia Z3+/Z4 exclusively for Verizon Wireless in the United States. However, on October 5, 2015, Sony and Verizon announced the device had been cancelled, citing stiff competition from other flagships, as well as poor launch timing with the release of its successor, the Xperia Z5.

The Xperia Z4 first went on sale in Japan on June 10, 2015, and the Xperia Z3+ first went on sale in Hong Kong on June 12, 2015.

== Specifications ==
The Xperia Z3+/Z4 is nearly identical in design to its predecessor, with a metal frame and glass rear, aside from minor differences such as a slimmer and lighter build. The Qualcomm Snapdragon 801 of the Z3 has been replaced by a Snapdragon 810, with support for LTE Cat 6. The Xperia Z3+/Z4 features a 5.2 inches (13 cm) FHD 1080p display with a density of 424 ppi, featuring Sony's "Triluminos" technology, as well as 32 GB of internal storage and a non-removable 2930 mAh battery with support for Qualcomm's Quick Charge 2.0 standard.

The Xperia Z4 has several features not found in the Xperia Z3+, such as a 1seg DTV antenna allowing for reception of television channels broadcasting using the ISDB-T standard, as well as an Osaifu-Keitai mobile payment system using Sony FeliCa ICs.

The now-cancelled Xperia Z4v for Verizon was thicker and heavier the Xperia Z3+/Z4 due to the inclusion of Qi/PMA wireless charging. The Xperia Z4v also would have featured a WQHD 1440p touchscreen display as well as the inclusion of Verizon logos on the front and back of the phone.

== Design ==
The Xperia Z3+/Z4 features an "Omni-Balance" design, somewhat modified from the Xperia Z3 and more reminiscent of that of the Xperia Z2. The Xperia Z3+/Z4 features an exposed micro USB port at the bottom, the first in the Xperia Z series and the second Sony phone overall after the Xperia M4 Aqua to have such a feature. Although the micro USB port is exposed, this does not impact the phone's IP65/68 dust protection, water jet protection and waterproof rating. The Xperia Z3+/Z4 is available in four colors: black, white, copper and aqua green (Ice Green in the UK).

== Variants ==
=== Xperia Z3+ ===
Model	Bands	References
E6533 (Dual)	FDD-LTE (Bands 1, 2, 3, 4, 5, 7, 8, 17, 20, 21), TD-LTE (Band 38, 39, 40, 41); UMTS HSPA+ 850 (Band V), 900 (Band VIII), 1700 (Band IV), 1900 (Band II), 2100 (Band I) MHz; GSM GPRS/EDGE 850, 900, 1800, 1900 MHz	
E6553	LTE Bands 1, 2, 3, 4, 5, 7, 8, 12, 17, 20, 28, 40; UMTS HSPA+ 850 (Band V), 900 (Band VIII), 1900 (Band II), 2100 (Band I) MHz; GSM GPRS/EDGE 850, 900, 1800, 1900 MHz	

=== Xperia Z4 ===
Model	Bands	References
402SO	LTE Bands 1, 3, 8, TD-LTE Band 41 (SoftBank Mobile); UMTS HSPA+ 2100 (Band I), 900 (Band VIII) MHz; GSM/GPRS/EDGE 850, 900, 1800, 1900 MHz	(Note: The 402SO model supports Hybrid 4G LTE using SoftBank 4G (AXGP) and SoftBank 4G LTE (FDD-LTE))
SO-03G	LTE Bands 1, 3, 19, 21, 28 (NTT DoCoMo); UMTS HSPA+ Bands 1, 5, 6, 19; GSM/GPRS/EDGE 850, 900, 1800, 1900 MHz	(Note: The SO-03G model supports DoCoMo Premium 4G LTE-A)
SOV31	LTE Bands 1, 3, 5, 17, 26, 28, TD-LTE Band 41 (au by KDDI); UMTS HSPA+ Bands 1, 2, 5, 6, 19; GSM/GPRS/EDGE 850, 900, 1800, 1900 MHz	(Note: The SOV31 model supports au 4G LTE CA (LTE-A), au 4G LTE (FDD-LTE) and WiMax 2.1)

=== Xperia Z4v (cancelled) ===
Model	Bands	References
E6508	LTE Bands 2, 3, 4, 7, 13, 20 (Verizon Wireless); CDMA 1x EVDO 850 (BC0), 1900 (BC1) MHz; UMTS HSPA+ 850 (Band V), 900 (Band VIII), 1900 (Band II), 2100 (Band I) MHz; GSM GPRS/EDGE 850, 900, 1800, 1900 MHz	

== Notes ==
Preceded by Sony Xperia Z3	Sony Xperia Z3+ 2015	Succeeded by Sony Xperia Z5
