= Sony Xperia XZ =

Android smartphone developed by Sony

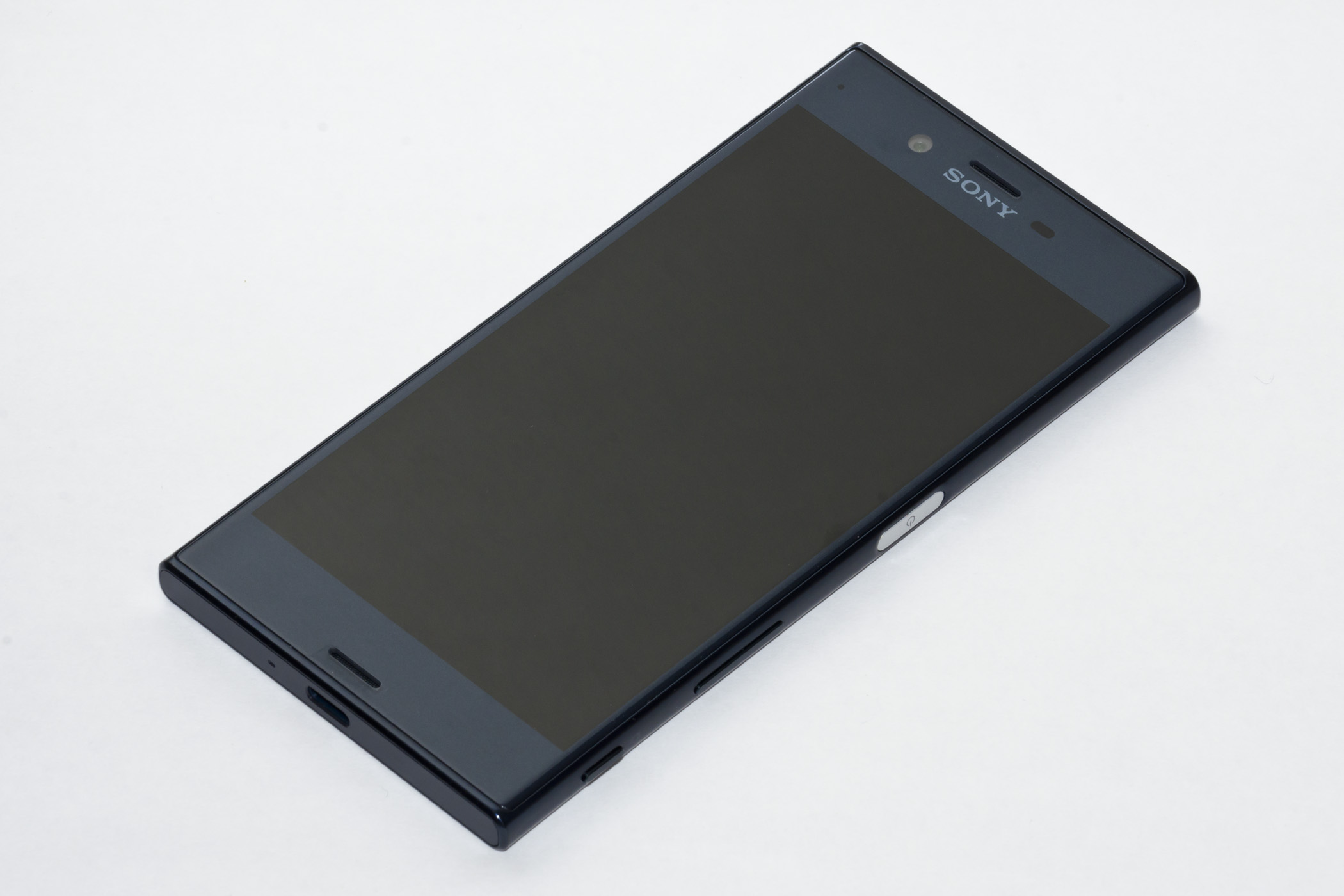
- Brand: Sony
- Manufacturer: Sony Mobile Communications
- Type: Smartphone
- First released: 30 September 2016; 9 years ago
- Availability by region: 30 September 2016; 9 years ago (Taiwan); 1 October 2016; 9 years ago (United Arab Emirates); 2 October 2016; 9 years ago (United States); 6 October 2016; 9 years ago (United Kingdom); 7 October 2016; 9 years ago (Hong Kong); 10 October 2016; 9 years ago (India); 13 October 2016; 9 years ago (Brazil); 15 October 2016; 9 years ago (Singapore); 20 October 2016; 9 years ago (Australia); 27 October 2016; 9 years ago (Thailand); 2 November 2016; 9 years ago (Japan); 18 November 2016; 9 years ago (Philippines)
- Predecessor: Sony Xperia X
- Successor: Sony Xperia XZ1
- Related: Sony Xperia XZs; Sony Xperia XZ Premium
- Compatible networks: HSPA, GSM & LTE
- Form factor: Slate
- Dimensions: 146 mm (5.7 in) H 72 mm (2.8 in) W 8.1 mm (0.32 in) D
- Weight: 161 g (5.7 oz)
- Operating system: Android 6.0 Marshmallow; Upgradable to Android 8.0 Oreo
- System-on-chip: Qualcomm Snapdragon 820 MSM8996
- CPU: Quad-core (dual 2.15 GHz + dual 1.6 GHz) 64-bit Kryo processor
- GPU: Adreno 530
- Memory: 3 GB RAM
- Storage: 32 GB (Single SIM); 64 GB (Dual SIM)
- Removable storage: microSDXC; expandable up to 256 GB
- Battery: Non-removable Li-ion 2900 mAh
- Rear camera: 23 MP 1/2.3" Exmor RS for mobile sensor, BIONZ, RGBC-IR, Laser AF, Predictive Hybrid AF, Quick launch, 5x Clear Image Zoom, 24mm Wide Angle G Lens F2.0; 4K (2160p) video recording @ 30 fps, 1080p@60fps
- Front camera: 13 MP 1/3.06" Exmor RS for mobile sensor, with Quick launch and 22mm Wide Angle Lens F2.0
- Display: 5.2 in (130 mm) 1080p IPS LCD; Full HD 1920x1080 px TRILUMINOS Display for mobile with X-Reality for mobile and Dynamic Contrast Enhancement
- Connectivity: Wi-Fi; NFC; DLNA; GPS/GLONASS/BeiDou; Bluetooth 4.2; USB 2.0 (Type-C port, USB charging, Quick Charge 3.0); USB OTG; 1seg (SO-01J, SOV34 and 601SO models only); Osaifu-Keitai (SO-01J, SOV34 and 601SO models only)
- Data inputs: Multi-touch, capacitive touchscreen, proximity sensor
- Model: Single SIM: F8331, SO-01J (NTT DoCoMo), SOV34 (au by KDDI), 601SO (SoftBank Mobile); Dual SIM: F8332
- Codename: Kagura
- Website: Official Website

The Sony Xperia XZ is an Android-based smartphone manufactured and marketed by Sony. Part of the Xperia X series, the device was announced to the public along with the Xperia X Compact at a press conference held at the annual IFA event on September 1, 2016. The Xperia XZ was first released in Taiwan on September 30, 2016, with worldwide sales starting with the United Arab Emirates on October 1 and the United States the following day; its home country Japan only started sales on November 2, 2016.

The device is described by Expert Reviews as the "true successor" of the Xperia Z5 and the whole Xperia Z series, and was succeeded Xperia Z5 Premium and Xperia X Performance as Sony's flagship. It is succeeded by the Xperia XZs and the flagship Sony Xperia XZ Premium.

It is also one of the first smartphones manufactured by Sony to utilize USB-C connectivity for charging and data transfer. Compared to its predecessors, the rear camera of the Xperia XZ now has laser autofocus, a first for Sony, built-in alongside the hybrid contrast/phase detection autofocus also found on the previous flagship. It also the first Sony device to sport an RGBC-IR color sensor to assist the image sensor in capturing accurate colors, temperature and white balance and the first smartphone to feature a five-axis digital image stabilization system for capturing blur-free photos and videos. The phone also has an IP68 rating, with it being dust and water resistant.

== Specifications ==
=== Hardware ===
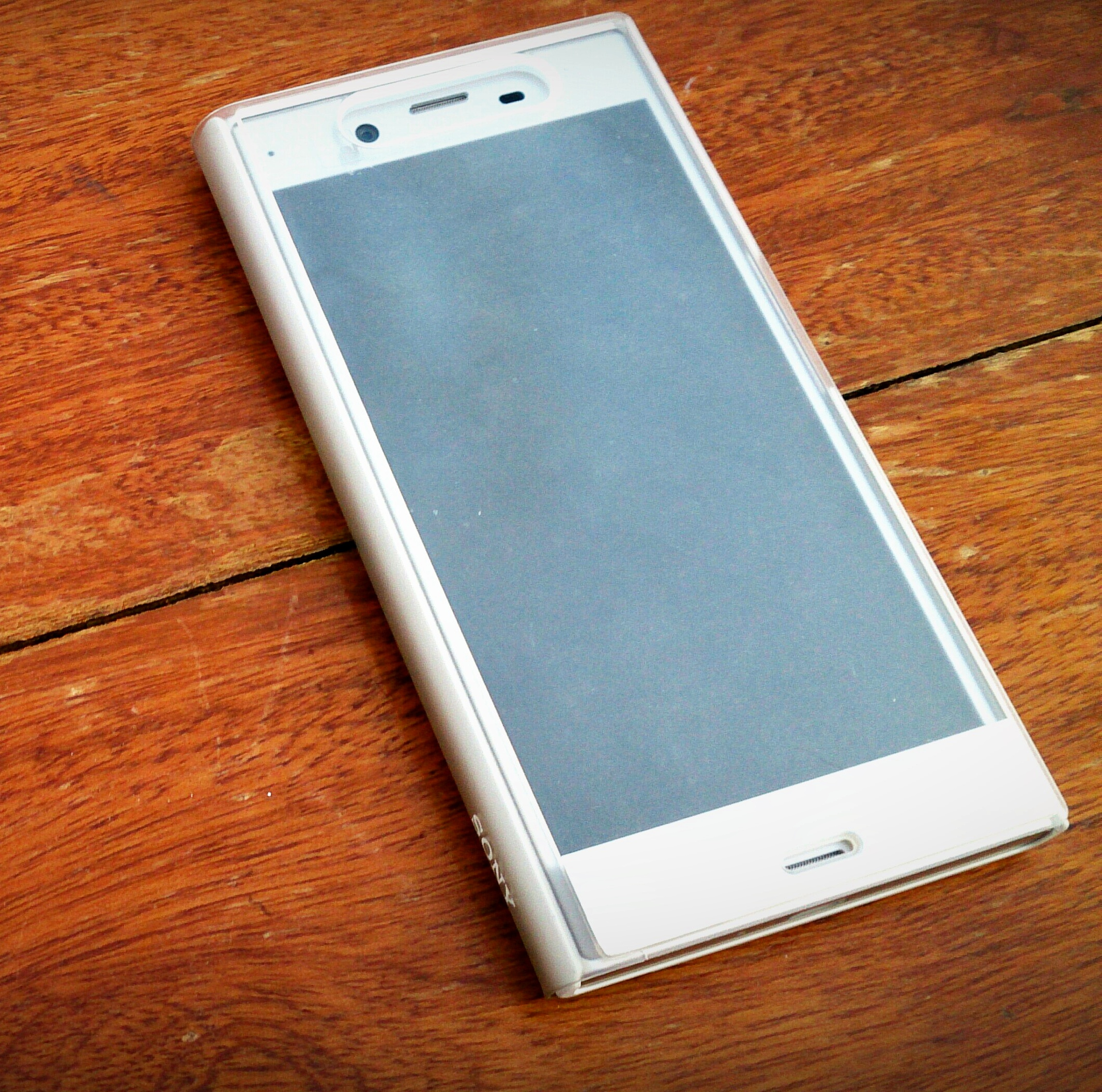
Xperia XZ in Platinum with Style Cover Touch SCTF10

The Xperia XZ's design consists of 3 different materials that blend together in what Sony calls "Loop Surface": a nylon frame, scratch-resistant front glass and an aluminium alloy metal back. The rear cover of the device is made from an aluminium alloy marketed as ALKALEIDO, a trademark by Kobe Steel, specifically engineered to complement the smartphone's premium design with a material "that has an extra shine and a feeling of depth". The device's front side is covered in Gorilla Glass to protect it from scratches and high drops. Also up front are dual front-firing stereo speakers, one on top along with the front selfie camera, ambient light and proximity sensors and notification LED, and the other one at the bottom bezel.

The Xperia XZ's dimensions are 146 mm (5.7 in) in height, with a width of 72 mm (2.8 in) and a depth of 8.1 mm (0.32 in) and weighs approximately 161 g (5.7 oz). The device brings back the 5.2 in (130 mm) 1080p IPS LCD with a pixel density of 424 ppi that started with the Xperia Z2 but with a brand new panel, featuring Sony's TRILUMINOS™ display and X-Reality for mobile technology. It is powered by a quad-core Qualcomm Snapdragon 820 (MSM8996) chipset with 4 custom Kryo processors (2 × 2.15 GHz and 2 × 1.6 GHz), 3 GB of RAM and relies on the Adreno 530 clocked at 624 MHz for graphics rendering. The device also has an internal storage of 32 GB for the single-SIM variant and 64 GB for the dual-SIM variant, both with microSD card expansions up to 256 GB (in a hybrid slot for the dual-SIM variant).

The Xperia XZ antennas support up to a maximum of LTE Category 9 speeds with a maximum theoretical downlink speed of 450-500 Mbit/s using 3CA, excluding the SOV34 model whose maximum theoretical downlink 3CA speed is limited to maximum 370 Mbit/s.

=== Connectivity and Features ===
Unlike some recently released smartphones from competing brands, the Xperia XZ doesn't abandon the standard 3.5 mm audio jack in favor of wireless substitutes. It does, however, have LDAC, an audio coding technology developed by Sony, that enables the transmission of 24bit/96 kHz High-Resolution (Hi-Res) audio content over Bluetooth at up to 990 kbit/s, three times faster than conventional audio streaming codecs, to compatible audio devices. It also has the standard set of connectivity options like Bluetooth 4.2 LE with aptX, NFC, dual-band Wi-Fi with Wi-Fi Direct, DLNA and hotspot, GPS and A-GPS, GLONASS and BDS. Like its predecessors, it has an IP rating of IP68, making the Xperia XZ dust proof and water resistant for over 1.5 meters and 30 minutes under water. The device also feature a fingerprint sensor embedded into the power button that can be used to unlock the phone and secure it from unauthorized access. This feature is disabled by default in the US.

=== Battery ===
The Xperia XZ is powered by a non-removable 2900 mAh battery, with a USB-C connector for charging and data transfer, one of the first two Sony smartphones to have one, the other one being the Xperia X Compact. It has QuickCharge 3.0 support and Qnovo adaptive charging technology built-in. This allows the device to monitor the cell's electrochemical processes in real time and adjust charging parameters accordingly to minimize cell damage and extend the battery cell's lifespan. It also comes with Battery Care, a Sony proprietary feature, that controls the charging process of the phone by learning and recognizing the user's charging patterns, preventing the phone from damaging the battery's cells from excessive heat due to overcharging. For example, when charging overnight, Battery Care stops the initial charge to 90 percent and then continue charging until full where it left off the next day.

=== Camera ===
The rear camera of the Xperia XZ features a new multi-aspect 24.8 MP Sony Exmor RS image sensor, officially named as Sony IMX300. Similar to the Xperia Z5 series, the Xperia X and Xperia X Performance, it has 23 megapixels with a sensor size of 1/2.3 inch and a f/2.0 aperture. Sony introduces the Triple Image Sensing technology with the Xperia XZ, comprised by the Image sensing (CMOS sensor with PDAF), Distance sensing (Laser AF sensor) and Color sensing (RGBC-IR sensor) systems. It features a hybrid autofocus that utilizes phase detection to lock focus on a subject within 0.03 seconds, also same with the Xperia Z5. It also includes phase and contrast detection along with predictive motion tracking, both working together to adjust the right amount of contrast accurately and significantly reduce blur and image shift caused by shaky hands.

The Xperia XZ, for the first time, includes a laser autofocus sensor alongside the hybrid/PDAF in tracking and locking focus on an object faster than regular autofocus modes, and an RGBC-IR (RedGreenBlueClear-InfraRed) color sensor that assists the white balance function of the camera by providing additional data about the light conditions of the environment, thus improving the color accuracy of the image. It also has an upgraded SteadyShot with Intelligent Auto in addition to the 5-axis image stabilization. The front selfie camera has a 13-megapixel sensor with 22 mm and 90-degree wide-angle lens, making it the highest-resolution front-facer on a flagship Sony device.

The device also has 4K resolution video recording capabilities like the Xperia Z5. Similar to the Sony α7 II camera, the Xperia XZ features five-axis digital image stabilization, a first for a smartphone, that helps in producing smooth video with less camera shake and improved image quality in low light environments. This technology improves the image and video produced by detecting camera shake, such as angular motion consisting of pitch and yaw, shift shakes which consists of X and Y axis shifts and (rotational shake) by correcting the effects detected, shifting the lens to reduce visible image blur and shift shake.

== Software ==
The Sony Xperia XZ launches with Android 6.0 Marshmallow out of the box, with Sony's custom interface and software. On December 1, 2016, along with the Xperia X Performance and a few other Xperia devices, Sony announced that the Xperia XZ would receive an update to Android 7.0 Nougat. Just a day after, the Android 7.0 update has officially rolled out.
