= Au Xperia Z5 SOV32 =

2015 smartphone model

Xperia Z5 SOV32
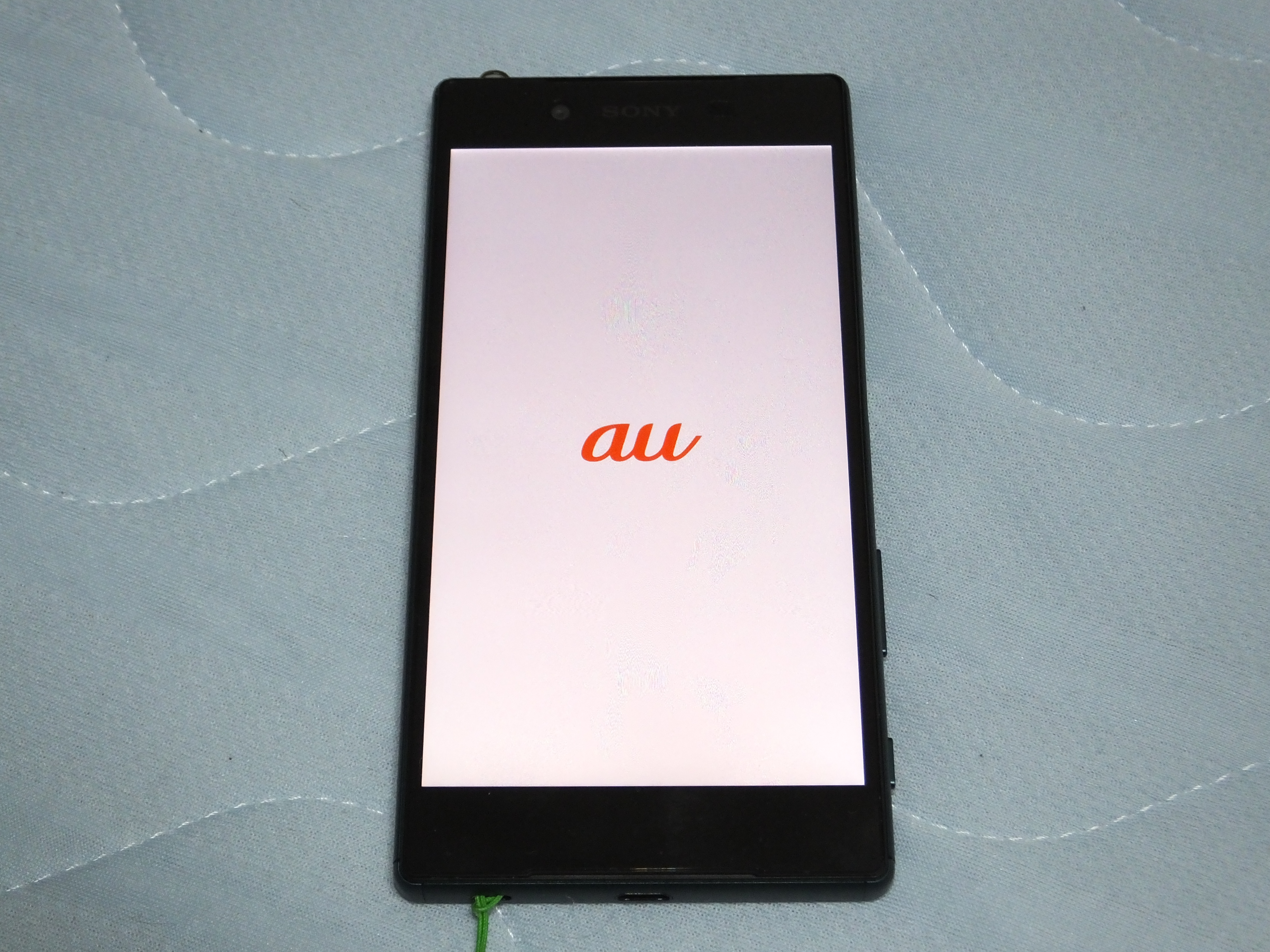
- Front of Xperia Z5 (SOV32)
- Brand: au
- Manufacturer: Sony Mobile Communications Japan
- Series: Sony Xperia Z series
- First released: October 29, 2015; January 28, 2016 (Pink)
- Predecessor: Xperia Z4 SOV31
- Successor: Xperia X Performance SOV33
- Compatible networks: 3.9G: FDD-LTE (au VoLTE) (700 MHz/N800 MHz/2 GHz); 3G: W-CDMA (850 MHz/2 GHz); 2G: GSM (1.9 GHz/1.8 GHz/900 MHz)
- Form factor: Bar
- Colors: White; Graphite Black; Gold; Green; Pink (additional color)
- Dimensions: 146 mm (5.7 in) H 72 mm (2.8 in) W 7.3 mm (0.29 in) D
- Weight: 154 g (5.4 oz)
- Operating system: Android 5.1, upgradable to 6.0 and 7.0
- System-on-chip: Qualcomm Snapdragon 810
- CPU: MSM8994 2.0 GHz + 1.5 GHz (octa-core)
- Memory: 3 GB RAM
- Storage: 32 GB
- Removable storage: microSD (up to 2 GB), microSDHC (up to 32 GB), microSDXC (up to 200 GB) (officially supported by KDDI)
- Battery: 2,900 mAh (non-removable)
- Charging: Approx. 130 minutes
- Rear camera: Approx. 23 megapixels, backside-illuminated stacked CMOS image sensor (Exmor RS for mobile), Hybrid AF, 4K UHD video recording, image stabilization, Timeshift video, AR effect
- Front camera: Approx. 5.1 megapixels, CMOS image sensor (Exmor R for mobile), face detection autofocus, 4K UHD video recording, image stabilization, Timeshift video, AR mask
- Display: 5.2-inch TFT Triluminos Display for mobile, FHD (1920 × 1080 pixels), approx. 16.77 million colors
- Water resistance: Waterproofing and Dustproofing
- Model: SOV32
- References: 1. Supports 3-component carrier aggregation (3CC CA, max downlink 300 Mbps) using 700 MHz/N800 MHz/2 GHz bands.; 2. Does not support infrared communication function.

The Xperia Z5 SOV32 is a smartphone developed by Sony Mobile Communications for the Japanese domestic market. It was released for KDDI and Okinawa Cellular Telephone Company under the au brand, featuring support for 3.9G (au 4G LTE/au VoLTE) and 4G (au 4G LTE CA/WiMAX 2+) mobile communication systems.

In the lead-up to the official commercial launch of Sony Mobile's Xperia Z5 smartphone, which was scheduled for release in late October, promotional and interactive marketing efforts were initiated in major retail districts. As part of these pre-release campaigns, a functional demonstration unit of the device was made available to the public at the Sofmap Akihabara Main Store.

Serving as the successor to the SOV31, this device is the Japanese domestic localized variant of the global Xperia Z5 model. It is the first model in the Xperia series to include a fingerprint biometric authentication sensor.

The Xperia Z5 received a new "Pink" variant, aligning with a identical color expansion previously announced by competitor NTT Docomo for its respective model (SO-01H). The au variant was scheduled for a late January 2016 release, slightly ahead of Docomo's early February deployment.

== Software update ==
On March 28, 2017, Japanese telecommunications operators KDDI and Okinawa Cellular Telephone Company announced a major software update for the Xperia Z5 (SOV32), which were originally released in 2015. The update, which initiated a sequential rollout on March 30, 2017, at 18:00 JST, upgraded the operating system of both devices to Android 7.0 "Nougat".

== Gallery ==
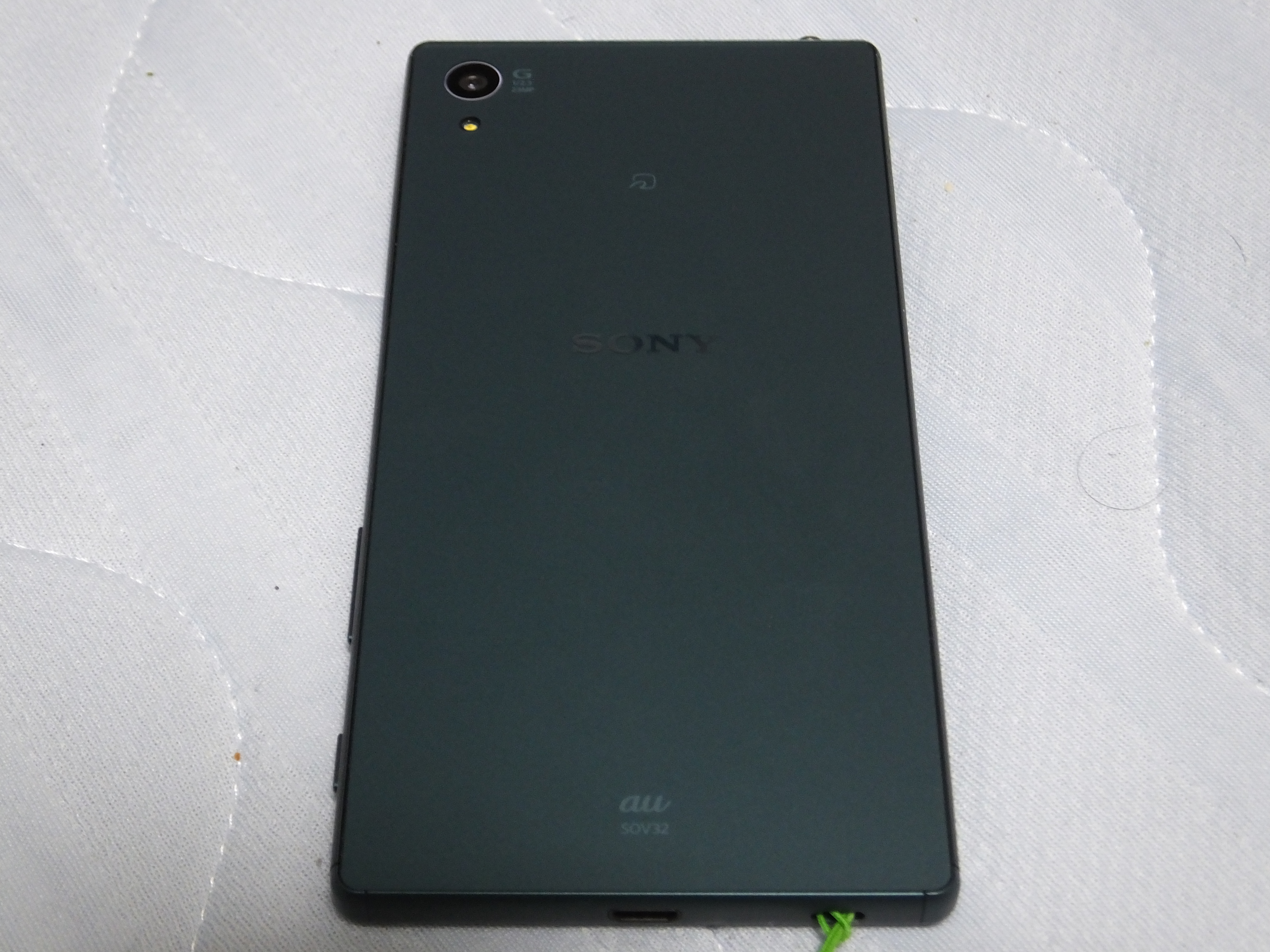
Real panel view

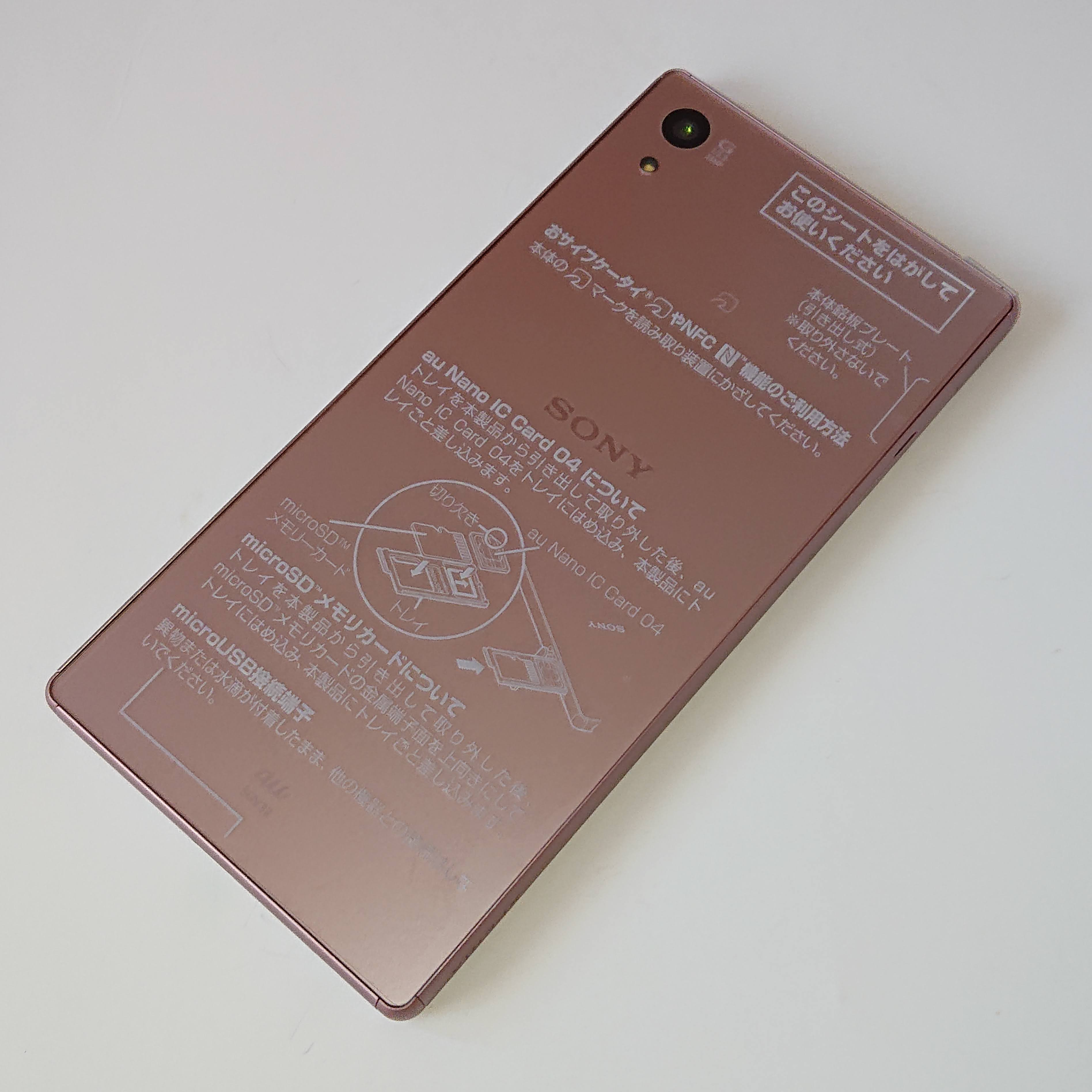
"Pink" colorway
