= Sony Xperia Z5 =

Android smartphone produced by Sony

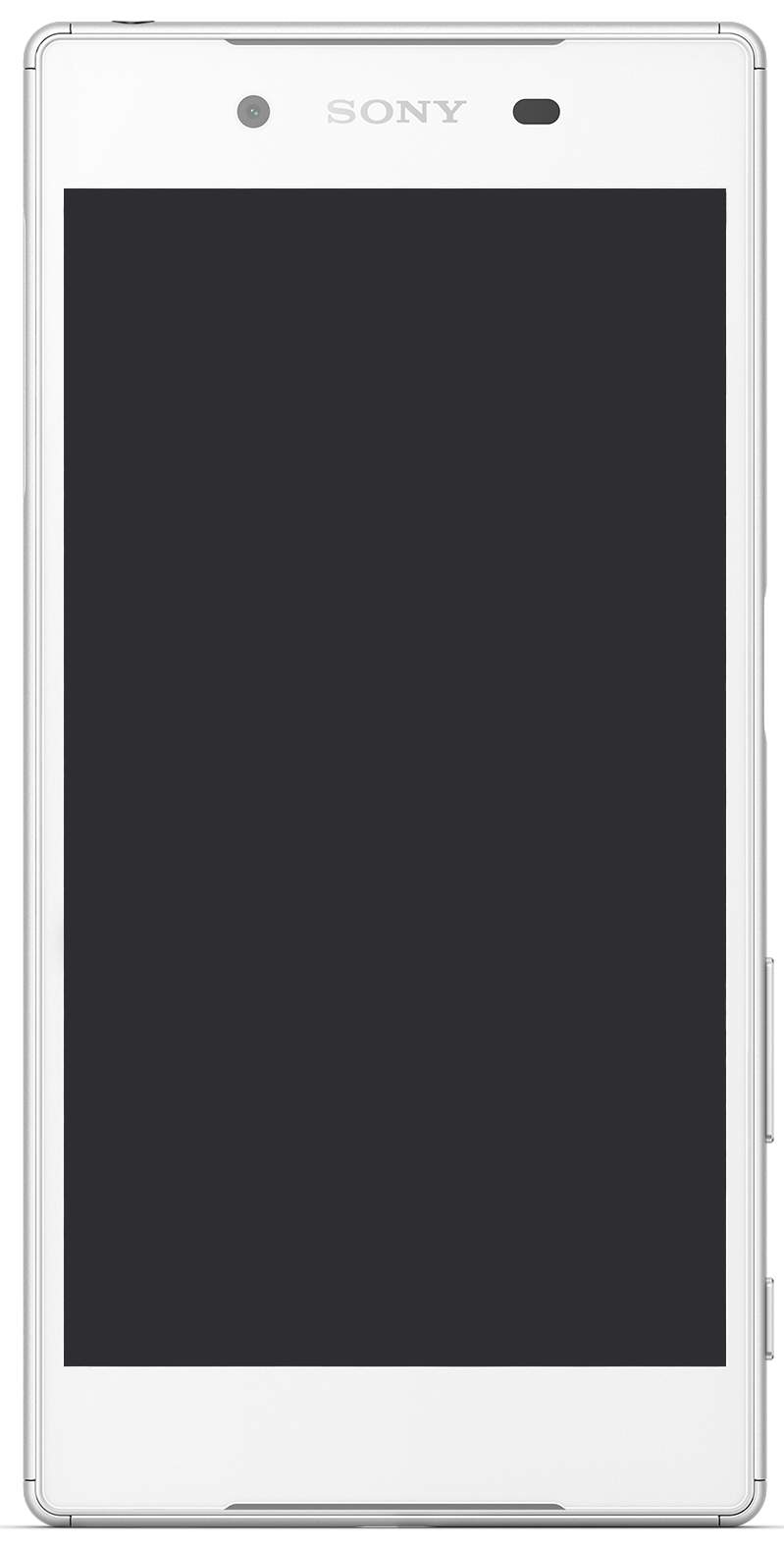
- Brand: Sony
- Manufacturer: Sony Mobile Communications
- Type: Touchscreen smartphone
- Series: Sony Xperia
- First released: 2 September 2015; 11 years ago
- Availability by region: 1 October 2015; 11 years ago (Taiwan, United Kingdom); 13 October 2015; 11 years ago (Europe); 23 October 2015; 11 years ago (India); 29 October 2015; 10 years ago (Canada, Japan; SO-01H variant exclusively for NTT DoCoMo, SOV32 variant exclusively for au by KDDI, 501SO variant exclusively for SoftBank Mobile); 2 July 2016; 10 years ago (USA)
- Predecessor: Sony Xperia Z3+ (Global); Sony Xperia Z4 SO-03G (Japan); Sony Xperia Z4 402SO (Japan); Sony Xperia Z4 SOV31 (Japan)
- Successor: Sony Xperia X
- Related: Sony Xperia Z5 Compact; Sony Xperia Z5 Premium
- Form factor: Slate
- Dimensions: 146 mm (5.7 in) H 72 mm (2.8 in) W 7.3 mm (0.29 in) D
- Weight: 154 g (5.4 oz)
- Operating system: Android 5.1.1 Lollipop Upgradable to Android 7.1.1 Nougat
- System-on-chip: Qualcomm Snapdragon 810 MSM8994
- CPU: Octa-core 64-bit 20 nm • Quad-core 2.0 GHz Cortex-A57 • Quad-core 1.5 GHz Cortex A-53
- GPU: Adreno 430
- Memory: 3 GB
- Storage: 32 GB
- Removable storage: Up to 200 GB microSDXC
- Battery: non-user removable Li-ion 2900 mAh
- Rear camera: 23 MP [Exmor RS IMX300],1/2.3" sensor size, back-side illuminated sensor, LED flash, 4K (2160p) video recording @ 30 fps, 1080p@60fps, 720p@120fps, 0.03 seconds Hybrid Autofocus
- Front camera: 5 MP [Exmor R IMX241],1/5" sensor size, 1080p video recording @ 30 fps, 720p@60fps
- Display: 5.2 in (130 mm) 1080p IPS LCD; Full HD 1920x1080 px TRILUMINOS™ Display with Live Color LED; X-Reality Engine for Mobile; Dynamic Contrast Enhancer
- Connectivity: Wi-Fi; DLNA; GPS/GLONASS/BeiDou; NFC; Bluetooth 4.1; MHL 3.0; USB 2.0 (Micro-B port, USB charging, Quick Charge 2.0); USB OTG; 3.50 mm (0.138 in) headphone jack, 5 pole, fingerprint sensor
- Data inputs: Multi-touch, capacitive touchscreen, proximity sensor
- Model: E6603, E6653 (single sim); E6633, E6683 (dual sim); SO-01H, SOV32, 501SO (Japanese variant)
- Codename: Sumire
- Other: List: Available in graphite black, white, gold and green IP65 / IP68 (Dust protected, Water jet protected & Waterproof) Digital Noise cancellation Sony Exmor R for Mobile Sony Exmor RS for Mobile Sony G Lens Sony BIONZ image processor SteadyShot Smile shutter SensMe TrackID Sony Entertainment Network PlayStation App Remote Play 1seg (501SO, SO-01H and SOV32 variants only) Osaifu-Keitai (501SO, SO-01H and SOV32 variants only) LISMO (SOV32 variant only) NOTTV (SO-01H variant only) POBox Plus (501SO, SO-01H and SOV32 variants only)
- Website: Official website

The Sony Xperia Z5 is an Android-based smartphone produced by Sony. Part of the Sony Xperia Z series, the device, at that point known by the project code name "Sumire", was unveiled alongside the Xperia Z5 Compact and Xperia Z5 Premium during a press conference at IFA 2015 on September 2, 2015. The device was launched globally in October and was launched in the United States as an unlocked device in February 2016. It is the successor to the Sony Xperia Z3+ internationally, as the Sony Xperia Z4 was exclusively released in Japan.

Similar to its predecessor, the device is water and dust-resistant with an IP rating of IP65 and IP68. It is Sony's first device to feature a fingerprint sensor. The device comes with 23 Megapixel camera with 0.03 seconds Hybrid Autofocus that utilizes phase detection autofocus, similarly found in the Xperia M5.

In February 2016, it was confirmed by Sony Mobile's senior product marketing manager Jun Makino that the Sony Xperia Z5 will be the final smartphone in the Sony Xperia Z series, with all future releases being released as part of the Sony Xperia X series. However this rumor was dismissed as Sony's Head of Marketing, Don Mesa has clarified that the X Series will not replace the Z Series.

== Specifications ==
=== Hardware ===
Unlike its predecessors, the Xperia Z5's body design consists of an aluminium frame with a frosted glass backing to reduce fingerprints appearing on the back of the phone. The device carries an IP rating of IP65 and IP68, making it dust and water resistant. The device features a 5.15 inches (13.1 cm) (marketed as 5.2-in) 1080p display with a density of 424 ppi, featuring Sony's "Triluminos" technology. The device also features a 64-bit 2.0 GHz octa-core Qualcomm Snapdragon 810 system-on-chip with 3 GB of RAM. The device also has 32 GB internal storage with microSD card expansion up to 200 GB. The device also includes a non-removable 2900 mAh battery.

The rear-facing camera of the Xperia Z5 is 23 megapixels with sensor size of 1/2.3 inch and an aperture of f/2.0, featuring a newer Sony Exmor RS image sensor, instead of the 20.7 megapixels image sensor which was used in all of its predecessors, starting from the Xperia Z1. Similarly found in the Xperia M5, the devices also features hybrid autofocus that utilizes phase detection autofocus that can focus the object within 0.03 seconds.

Xperia Z5 also features a redesigned power button located on the right side of the device with a fingerprint recognition system which can be used to unlock the phone. However, the fingerprint sensor is disabled in the US version of the phone due to a "business decision", although it can be reenabled by modifying the firmware.

=== Software ===
The Xperia Z5 is preinstalled with Android 5.1 Lollipop with Sony's custom interface and software. Pre-loaded applications on the Z5 provide access to Google's various services, including Google Play, which can be used to download and purchase apps, music, movies, and e-books.

On first week of March 2016, Sony released the Android 6.0 Marshmallow software update for the Xperia Z5.

On August 23, 2016, Sony announced that the Xperia Z5 would receive an upgrade to Android 7.0 Nougat. The update started rolling out in January 2017, but was put on hold shortly thereafter upon "reports from some users experiencing inconsistencies related to audio playback via third-party apps and SD card encrypted data read performance." The update re-commenced in February 2017.

== See also ==
- Sony Xperia Z5 Compact
- Sony Xperia Z5 Premium

Preceded by Sony Xperia Z3+	Sony Xperia Z5; 2015	Succeeded by Sony Xperia XZ
