= Sony Xperia Z3 =

Android smartphone by Sony

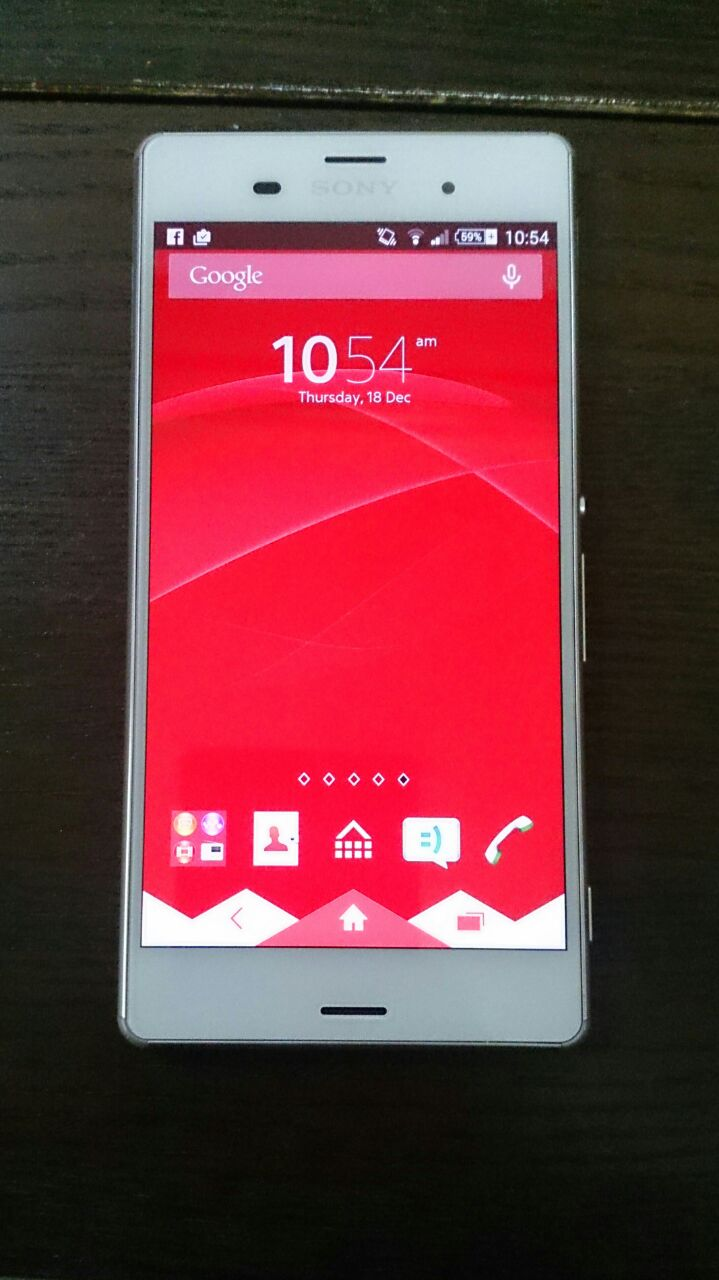
- Brand: Sony
- Manufacturer: Sony Mobile Communications
- Type: Touchscreen smartphone
- Series: Sony Xperia
- First released: September 4, 2014; 12 years ago
- Availability by region: List: September 19, 2014; 12 years ago (Taiwan); September 22, 2014; 12 years ago (South Korea); September 23, 2014; 12 years ago (China, L55u variant exclusively for China Unicom); September 25, 2014; 12 years ago (India); September 26, 2014; 12 years ago (United Kingdom); September 29, 2014; 12 years ago (China, L55t variant exclusively for China Mobile); October 4, 2014; 12 years ago (Singapore); October 23, 2014; 11 years ago (Japan, SOL26 and SO-01G variants for au by KDDI and NTT DoCoMo; United States, Z3v variant exclusively for Verizon Wireless); October 29, 2014; 11 years ago (United States, D6616 variant exclusively for T-Mobile US); October 31, 2014; 11 years ago (Canada); November 21, 2014; 11 years ago (Japan, 401SO variant exclusively for SoftBank Mobile); May 1, 2015; 11 years ago (D6683 dual sim with TDD-LTE support exclusively for Hong Kong)
- Predecessor: Sony Xperia Z2; Sony Xperia ZL2 (Japan)
- Successor: Sony Xperia Z3+ (Worldwide); Sony Xperia Z4 (Japan)
- Related: List: Sony Xperia Z2 Tablet Sony Xperia Z3 Compact Sony Xperia Z3 Tablet Compact Sony Xperia Z3 401SO (Japan) Sony Xperia Z3 SO-01G (Japan) Sony Xperia Z3 SOL26 (Japan)
- Form factor: Slate
- Dimensions: 146×72×7.3 mm (5.75×2.83×0.29 in)
- Weight: 152 g (5 oz)
- Operating system: Android 4.4.4 KitKat (launch) (last version for L55t, L55u); Android 5.0.2 Lollipop (last version for SOL26, 401SO, D6616); Android 5.1.1 Lollipop (last version for D6708); Android 6.0.1 Marshmallow (current); Android 7.0 Nougat (developer preview)
- System-on-chip: Qualcomm Snapdragon 801
- CPU: 2.5 GHz quad-core Krait (2.5 GHz Qualcomm MSM8974AC Quad Core)
- GPU: Adreno 330
- Memory: 3 GB RAM
- Storage: 16 GB (D6603, D6633, D6653, D6683, L55t, L55u); 32 GB (D6616, D6646, D6708, SO-01G, SOL26, 401SO)
- Removable storage: Up to 128 GB microSDXC
- Battery: non-user removable Li-ion 3100 mAh (3200 mAh for D6708/Z3v variant)
- Rear camera: Sony G Lens 20.7 MP 1/2.3" Exmor RS IMX220S back-side illuminated sensor with BIONZ™ Engine for mobile image processor and LED flash 2160p video recording @ 30 frames/s 1080p video recording @ 30/60 frames/s 720p video recording @ 30/120 frames/s
- Front camera: 2.2 MP (1080p video recording)
- Display: 5.2 in (130 mm) diagonal IPS LCD; Full HD 1920x1080 px TRILUMINOS™ Display with Live Color LED; X-Reality Engine for Mobile
- Connectivity: Wi-Fi; DLNA; GPS/GLONASS; NFC; Bluetooth 4.0; MHL 3.0; USB 2.0 (Micro-B port, USB charging); USB OTG; 3.50 mm (0.138 in) headphone jack, 5 pole
- Data inputs: Multi-touch, capacitive touchscreen, proximity sensor
- Model: D6603, D6643, D6646, D6653 (Single SIM); D6633, D6683 (Dual SIM); D6616 (for T-Mobile US); D6708 (Z3v variant for Verizon Wireless); SO-01G (for NTT DoCoMo); SOL26 (for au by KDDI; 401SO (for SoftBank Mobile); L55t (for China Mobile); L55u (for China Unicom)
- Codename: Leo
- Other: List: Available in black, white, copper, silver green and purple IP65 / IP68 (Dust protected, Water jet protected & Waterproof) Digital Noise cancellation Sony Exmor R for Mobile Sony Exmor RS for Mobile Sony G Lens 1/2.3 Aperture sensor Sony BIONZ image processor SteadyShot Smile shutter SensMe TrackID Sony Entertainment Network PlayStation App Remote Play 1seg (D6643, SO-01G, SOL26 and 401SO variants only) HAC/TTY (except D6643 model) Miracast Sony Sketch Qi wireless charging (D6708/Z3v variant only) Magnetic charge port (except D6708/Z3v variant) Osaifu-Keitai (SO-01G, SOL26 and 401SO variants only) LISMO (SOL26 variant only) NOTTV (SO-01G variant only) POBox Plus (SO-01G, SOL26 and 401SO variants only)
- Website: Official website

The Sony Xperia Z3 is an Android smartphone produced by Sony. Part of the Sony Xperia Z series, the Xperia Z3, at that point known by the project code name "Leo", was unveiled during a press conference at IFA 2014 on September 4, 2014. It was first released in Taiwan on September 19, 2014.

== Specifications ==
Like its predecessors, the Xperia Z3's design consists of a metal frame with a glass backing; the metal frame has been rounded, and the device itself is slightly slimmer than the Z2. The device carries slightly higher IP ratings for water and dust-proofing than the Z2. The device features a 5.15 inches (13.1 cm) (marketed as 5.2-in) 1080p display with a density of 424 ppi, featuring Sony's "Triluminos" technology. The device features a 2.5 GHz quad-core Qualcomm Snapdragon 801 system-on-chip with 3 GB of RAM. The Z3 includes a non-removable 3100 mAh battery. The Xperia Z3's rear-facing camera is 20.7 megapixels with a Sony Exmor RS image sensor, along with improvements to its "SteadyShot" and "Intelligent Active" modes.

== Software ==
=== History ===
The Xperia Z3 shipped with the Sony OEM version of Android 4.4.4 "KitKat". New additions to the bundled software include the Lifelog app, Sony Select, and support for Remote Play on the PlayStation 4 video game console. Android 5.0 "Lollipop" was first released for the Z3 in March 2015 in selected territories. Android 6.0 "Marshmallow" was first released in April 2016.

Developer preview builds of Android 7.0 "Nougat" were released for the Z3, but Sony stated that it was unable to release the final version due to "unforeseen platform limitations"; Qualcomm stated that it will not provide support for Nougat on any device using the Snapdragon 801 or 800 chipsets. The Adreno 330 GPU does not support the Vulkan or OpenGL ES 3.1 graphics APIs, which must be present in order to meet Google certification requirements for 7.0.

The Xperia Z3 was officially supported by LineageOS through versions 16.0 - 18.1, which correspond to Android releases 9 - 11. This means that the Xperia Z3 has (unofficially) supported seven major releases of Android.

=== Supported Android versions ===
Creator	Android version
Sony	4.4.4 "KitKat"
Sony	5.0 "Lollipop"
Sony	6.0 "Marshmallow"
Sony (developer beta)	7.0 "Nougat"
Unknown	8.0 "Oreo"
LineageOS	9.0 "Pie"
LineageOS	10.0
LineageOS, /e/OS	11.0

== Release history ==
On October 23, 2014, Sony Mobile released the Japan-only SOL26 and SO-01G models for au by KDDI and NTT DoCoMo respectively, as well as the Sony Xperia Z3v (D6708), a variant of the Xperia Z3 exclusively for Verizon Wireless in the United States. On October 29, 2014, the D6616 model was released exclusively for T-Mobile US and on November 21, 2014, Sony Mobile released the 401SO model exclusively for SoftBank Mobile in Japan.

Sony Xperia Z3 unlocked was made available via the Sony store on November 10, 2014.

The Xperia Z3 (D6616 model) was quietly discontinued by T-Mobile in April 2015, but returned to store shelves less than a month later with a price reduction. Verizon discontinued the Xperia Z3v (D6708) in August 2015.

== Reception ==
=== Critical reception ===
The Xperia Z3 generally received positive reviews, with critics praising its durability, battery life and improved display. Although many critics argued that the Z3 is just a minor upgrade from the Z2 with not much differences. Pocket Lint criticised the device for the tall design and "occasional software excess" but praised its battery life. The Verge praised the design of the device for being attractive yet rugged, built out of better materials than the Galaxy S5, and also waterproof. The Guardian called the device the best smartphone Sony has ever made, with an improvement in feel and design over its predecessor. However, it criticised the Z3 for lack of wireless charging for something waterproof with "fiddly doors" covering the charging port is disappointing, but it has a magnetic charging port for an accessory dock.

== Variants ==
Model	Bands	References
401SO	LTE Bands 1, 3, 8, TD-LTE Band 41 (SoftBank Mobile); UMTS HSPA+ 2100 (Band I), 850 (Band V), 900 (Band VIII); GSM/GPRS/EDGE 850, 900, 1800, 1900 MHz	
D6603	LTE Bands 1, 2, 3, 4, 5, 7, 8, 13, 17, 20; UMTS HSPA+ 850 (Band V), 900 (Band VIII), 1700 (Band IV), 1900 (Band II), 2100 (Band I) MHz; GSM GPRS/EDGE 850, 900, 1800, 1900 MHz	
D6616	LTE Bands 2, 4, 12 (T-Mobile US); UMTS HSPA+ 850 (Band V), 900 (Band VIII), 1700 (Band IV), 1900 (Band II), 2100 (Band I) MHz; GSM GPRS/EDGE 850, 900, 1800, 1900 MHz	
D6633 (Dual); D6643	LTE Bands 1, 2, 3, 4, 5, 7, 8, 17, 20; UMTS HSPA+ 850 (Band V), 900 (Band VIII), 1700 (Band IV), 1900 (Band II), 2100 (Band I) MHz; GSM GPRS/EDGE 850, 900, 1800, 1900 MHz	
D6653	FD-LTE Bands 1, 3, 5, 7, 8, 28, 40, 41, 42, 43, TD-LTE Band 40; UMTS HSPA+ 850 (Band V), 900 (Band VIII), 1900 (Band II), 2100 (Band I) MHz; GSM GPRS/EDGE 850, 900, 1800, 1900 MHz;	
D6683 (2015, Dual: Hong Kong, Australia)	FD-LTE (Bands 1, 3, 7), TD-LTE (Bands 38, 39, 40, 41); UMTS HSPA+ 850 (Band V), 900 (Band VIII), 1900 (Band II), 2100 (Band I) MHz; GSM GPRS/EDGE 850, 900, 1800, 1900 MHz;	
D6708 (Z3v)	LTE Bands 4, 13 (Verizon Wireless, LTE bands 2, 3, 7 are not available at launch); CDMA 1x EVDO 850 (BC0), 1900 (BC1) MHz; UMTS HSPA+ 850 (Band V), 900 (Band VIII), 1900 (Band II), 2100 (Band I) MHz; GSM GPRS/EDGE 850, 900, 1800, 1900 MHz	
L55t	TD-LTE Bands 38, 39, 40, 41 (China Mobile), FDD-LTE Bands 1, 3 and 7 (roaming only); UMTS HSPA+ Bands 1, 2, 5, 8; TD-SCDMA Bands 34, 39; GSM GPRS/EDGE 850, 900, 1800, 1900 MHz	
L55u	TD-LTE Band 41 (China Unicom), Band 40 (roaming only), FDD-LTE Band 3 (China Unicom), Band 1 (roaming only); UMTS HSPA+ Bands 1, 2, 5, 8; GSM GPRS/EDGE 850, 900, 1800, 1900 MHz	
SOL26	LTE Bands 3, 17, 18, 26, TD-LTE Band 41 (au by KDDI); CDMA JP 800 (BC0), 2100 (BC6); UMTS HSPA+ Bands 1, 2, 5; GSM/GPRS/EDGE 850, 900, 1800, 1900 MHz	
SO-01G	LTE Bands 1, 3, 19, 21 (NTT DoCoMo); UMTS HSPA+ Bands 1, 6, 19; GSM/GPRS/EDGE 850, 900, 1800, 1900 MHz	

== See also ==
- Sony Xperia Z3 Compact

Preceded by Sony Xperia Z2	Sony Xperia Z3; 2014	Succeeded by Sony Xperia Z4 (Japan)
Preceded by Sony Xperia Z2	Sony Xperia Z3; 2014	Succeeded by Sony Xperia Z3+
