= Sony Xperia Z5 Premium =

Android smartphone by Sony Xperia

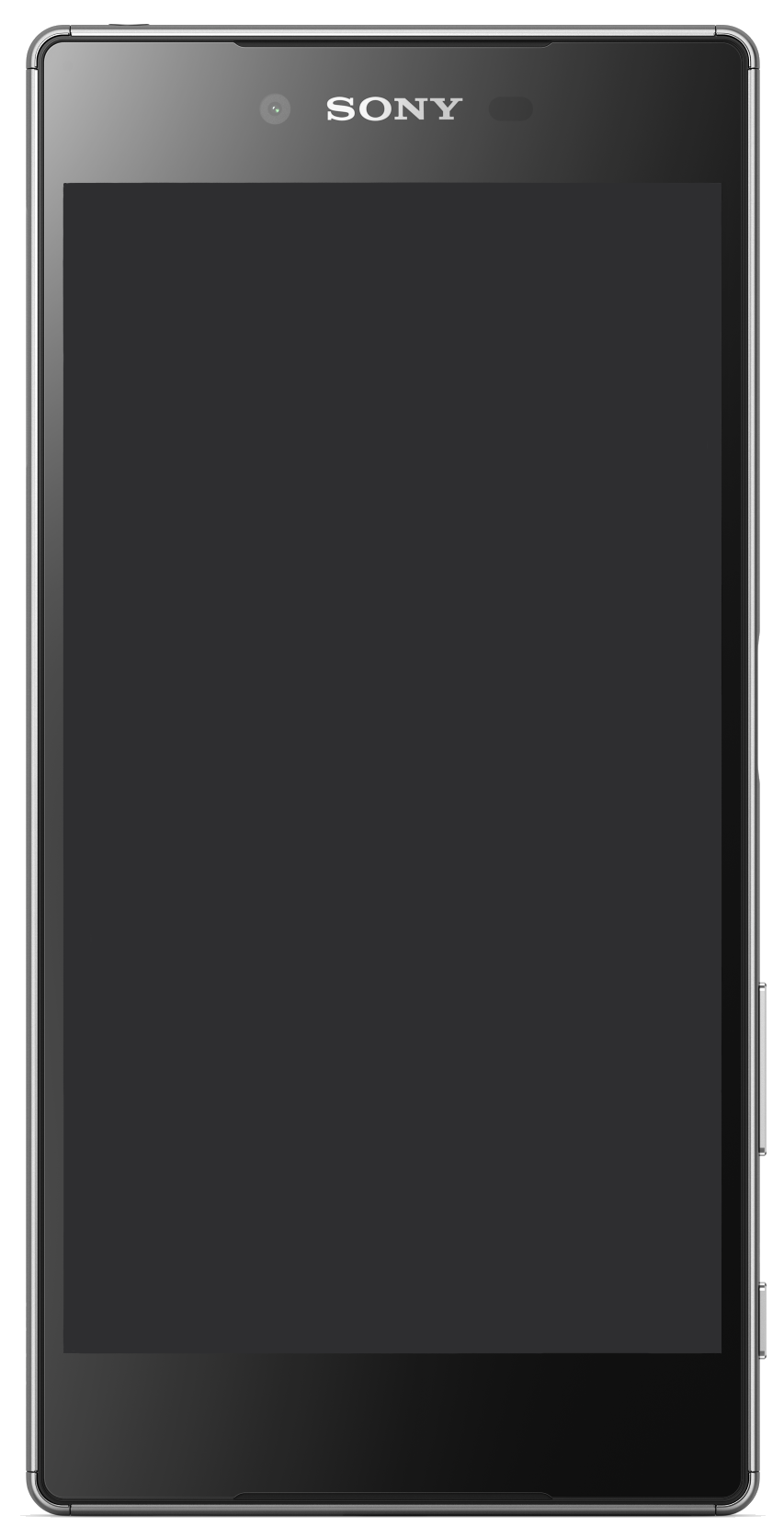
- Brand: Sony
- Manufacturer: Sony Mobile Communications
- Type: Touchscreen smartphone
- Series: Sony Xperia
- First released: 5 November 2015; 10 years ago
- Availability by region: 25 November 2015; 10 years ago (Canada); 5 November 2015; 10 years ago (Taiwan); 7 November 2015; 10 years ago (India); 10 November 2015; 10 years ago (Singapore); 12 November 2015; 10 years ago (United Kingdom); 13 November 2015; 10 years ago (Europe); 20 November 2015; 10 years ago (Japan, SO-03H variant exclusively for NTT DoCoMo)
- Successor: Sony Xperia XZ Premium (2017)
- Related: Sony Xperia Z5; Sony Xperia Z5 Compact
- Form factor: Slate
- Dimensions: 154.4 mm (6.08 in) H 76.0 mm (2.99 in) W 7.8 mm (0.31 in) D
- Weight: 180 g (6.3 oz)
- Operating system: Latest available software Android 5.1.1 "Lollipop"; Upgradable to Android 7.1.1 "Nougat" Latest available software: 32.4.A.1.54 Release started: 2017–10 (Oct) -10
- System-on-chip: Qualcomm Snapdragon 810 MSM8994
- CPU: Octa-core (2.0 GHz Quad-core Cortex-A57 & 1.5 GHz Quad-core Cortex-A53) 64-bit 20 nm
- GPU: Adreno 430
- Memory: 3 GB LPDDR4 RAM
- Storage: 32 GB
- Removable storage: Up to 256 GB microSDXC Samsung, SanDisk, Sony
- Battery: Non-user removable Li-ion 3,430 mAh
- Rear camera: 23 MP back-side illuminated sensor, LED flash, 4K (2160p) video recording @ 30 fps, 1080p@60fps, 720p@120fps, 0.03 seconds Hybrid Autofocus
- Front camera: 5.1MP, 1080p video recording @ 30fps, 720p@60fps
- Display: 5.5 in (140 mm) 4K UHD (3840×2160), IPS LCD 806 ppi TRILUMINOS™ Display with Live Color LED; X-Reality Engine for Mobile; Dynamic Contrast Enhancer
- Connectivity: -Wi-Fi -DLNA -GPS/GLONASS/BeiDou; NFC -Bluetooth 4.1 -External Hard Disk MHL 3.0; USB 2.0 (Micro-B port, USB charging, Quick Charge 2.0); USB OTG (Only FAT32, exFAT); 3.50 mm (0.138 in) headphone jack, 5 pole, fingerprint sensor
- Data inputs: Multi-touch, capacitive touchscreen, proximity sensor
- Model: E6853 (single sim), E6833, E6883 Dual SIM (Nano-SIM, dual stand-by); SO-03H (Japanese variant for NTT DoCoMo)
- Codename: Satsuki
- Other: List: Available in graphite black, chrome and gold IP65 / IP68 (Dust protected, Water jet protected & Waterproof) Digital Noise cancellation Sony Exmor R for Mobile Sony Exmor RS for Mobile Sony G Lens 1/2.3 Aperture sensor Sony BIONZ image processor SteadyShot Smile shutter SensMe TrackID Sony Entertainment Network PlayStation App Remote Play 1seg (SO-03H variant only) Osaifu-Keitai (SO-03H variant only) NOTTV (SO-03H variant only) POBox Plus (SO-03H variant only)
- Website: Official Website Official Forum Official Latest available software Submit Google Issues Chat Support Sony Authorized Service Centre Locator

The Sony Xperia Z5 Premium is an Android-based smartphone produced by Sony. Part of the Sony Xperia Z series, the device, at that point known by the project code name "Satsuki", was unveiled along with the Sony Xperia Z5 and Xperia Z5 Compact during a press conference at IFA 2015 on September 2, 2015. The device was first released in Taiwan on November 5, 2015, and was the first smartphone with 4K resolution.

The Sony Xperia Z5 Premium is an up-scaled version of the Xperia Z5 and is the first ever smartphone to feature a 4K display. Similarly to the Xperia Z5, the device also features a fingerprint reader and a 23 Megapixel camera with 0.03 seconds Hybrid Autofocus that utilizes phase detection autofocus.

== Specifications ==
Unlike the Xperia Z5, the device features a 4K 5.5 in (140 mm) screen with the resolution of 3840×2160 pixels whilst still retaining 2 hours and 30 minutes of battery life.

== Hardware ==
The Sony Xperia Z5 Premium has a 5.5-inch IPS LCD, Octa-core (4x1.5 GHz Cortex-A53 & 4x2.0 GHz Cortex-A57) Qualcomm Snapdragon 810 processor, 3 GB of RAM and 32 GB of internal storage that can be expanded using microSD cards up to 256 GB. The phone has a 3430 mAh Li-ion battery, 23 MP rear camera with an LED flash and a 5.1 MP front-facing camera with auto-focus. It is available in Chrome, Black, Gold, Pink colors.

== Software ==
The Xperia Z5 Premium is preinstalled with Android 5.1 Lollipop with Sony's custom interface and software.

It also has been upgraded to run Android 6.0 Marshmallow.

On August 23, 2016, Sony announced that the Xperia Z5 Premium would receive an upgrade to Android 7.0 Nougat.

On February 16, 2017, Android 7.0 Nougat has been upgraded for the Sony Xperia Z5 Premium Dual Sim E6883. On June 28, 2017, it started to roll out the Android 7.1.1 Nougat firmware update.

== Variants ==
Model	Bands	Ref.
E6833; E6883 (Dual)	E6833: UMTS HSPA+ 850 (Band V), 900 (Band VIII), 1900 (Band II), AWS-1(Band IV), 2100 (Band I) MHz GSM GPRS/EDGE 850, 900, 1800, 1900 MHz LTE (Bands 1, 2, 3, 4, 5, 7, 8, 12, 17, 20) E6883: UMTS HSPA+ 850 (Band V), 900 (Band VIII), 1900 (Band II), AWS-1(Band IV), 2100 (Band I) MHz GSM GPRS/EDGE 850, 900, 1800, 1900 MHz LTE (Bands 1, 2, 3, 4, 5, 7, 8, 12, 17, 20, 38, 39, 40, 41)	
E6853	UMTS HSPA+ 850 (Band V), 900 (Band VIII), 1900 (Band II), 2100 (Band I) MHz GSM GPRS/EDGE 850, 900, 1800, 1900 MHz LTE (Bands 1, 2, 3, 4, 5, 7, 8, 12, 17, 20, 28, 38, 40)	
