= Sony Xperia XZs =

Android smartphone by Sony

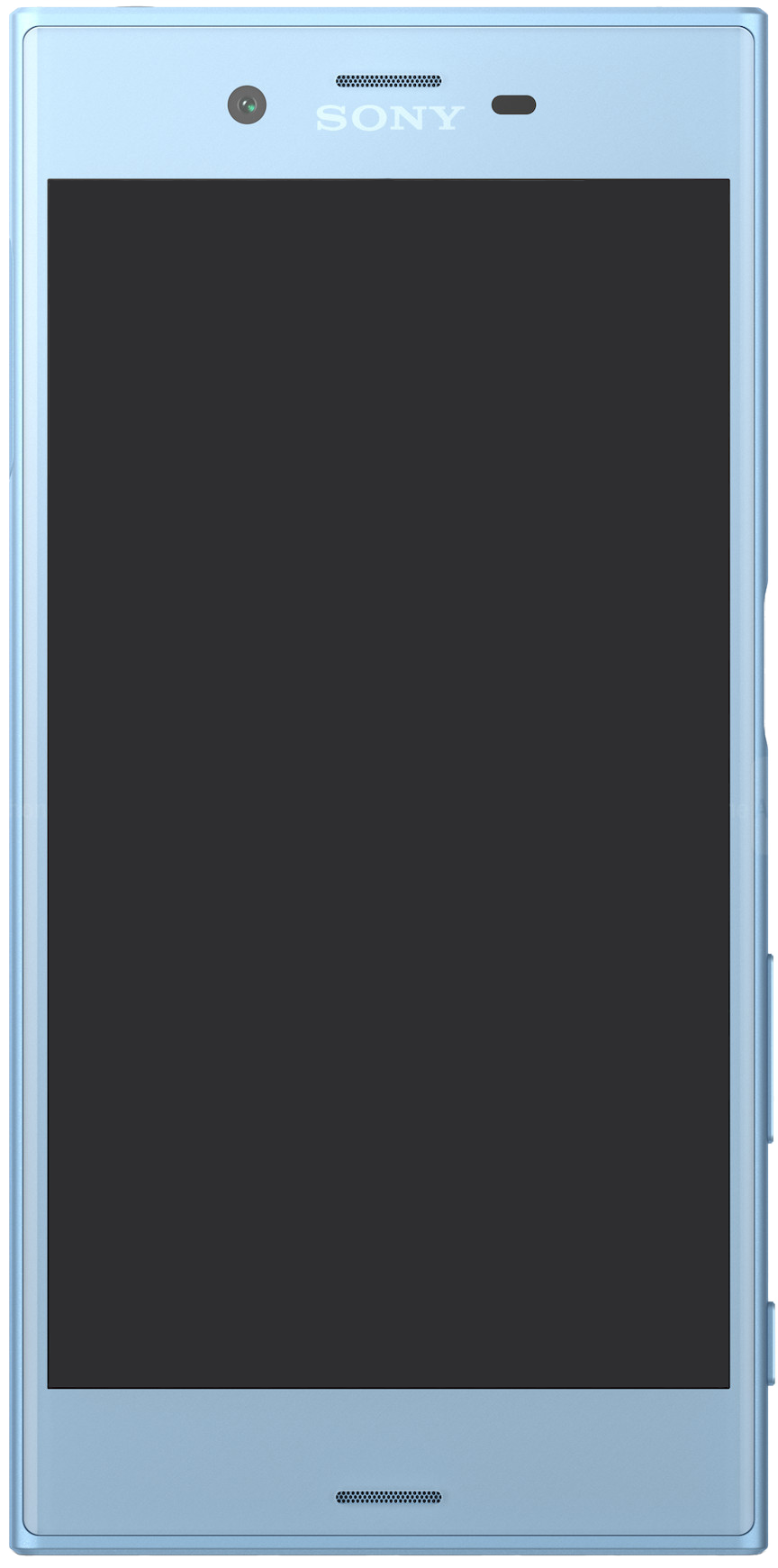
- Brand: Sony
- Manufacturer: Sony Mobile Communications
- Type: Smartphone
- Series: Sony Xperia
- First released: 5 April 2017; 9 years ago
- Availability by region: 5 April 2017; 9 years ago (United States); 7 April 2017; 9 years ago (Taiwan); 11 April 2017; 9 years ago (India); 22 April 2017; 9 years ago (Singapore); 27 April 2017; 9 years ago (Thailand)
- Predecessor: Sony Xperia XZ; Sony Xperia X Performance
- Successor: Sony Xperia XZ1
- Related: Sony Xperia XZ Premium
- Compatible networks: HSPA, GSM & LTE
- Form factor: Slate
- Dimensions: 146 mm (5.7 in) H 72 mm (2.8 in) W 8.1 mm (0.32 in) D
- Weight: 161 g (5.7 oz)
- Operating system: Original: Android 7.1 "Nougat" Current: Android 8.0 "Oreo"
- System-on-chip: Qualcomm Snapdragon 820 MSM8996
- CPU: Quad-core (dual 2.15 GHz + dual 1.6 GHz) 64-bit Kryo processor
- GPU: Adreno 530
- Memory: 4 GB RAM
- Storage: 32 GB (Single SIM); 64 GB (Dual SIM)
- Removable storage: microSDXC; expandable up to 256 GB
- Battery: Non-removable Li-ion 2900 mAh
- Rear camera: 19 MP Motion Eye™ Camera, 1/2.3'' memory-stacked Exmor RS for mobile sensor (1.22μm), BIONZ, RGBC-IR, Laser AF, Predictive Hybrid AF, Predictive Capture, Quick launch, 5x Clear Image Zoom, 25mm Wide Angle G Lens, f/2.0 4K (2160p) video recording, 720p 960 fps super slow motion videos, SteadyShot with Intelligent Active Mode (5-axis stabilization)
- Front camera: 13 MP 1/3.06'' Exmor RS for mobile sensor, with Quick launch and 22mm Wide Angle Lens and f/2.0 aperture, SteadyShot with Intelligent Active Mode (5-axis stabilization)
- Display: 5.2 in (130 mm) 1080p IPS LCD; Full HD 1920x1080 px TRILUMINOS Display for mobile with X-Reality for mobile, Dynamic Contrast Enhancement, sRGB 138%
- Connectivity: Wi-Fi; DLNA; GPS/GLONASS/BeiDou; Bluetooth 4.2; USB 2.0 (Type-C port, USB charging, Quick Charge 3.0)
- Data inputs: Multi-touch, capacitive touchscreen, proximity sensor
- Model: Single SIM: G8231; Dual SIM: G8232
- Codename: Keyaki
- Website: Official Website

The Sony Xperia XZs is an Android smartphone that is manufactured and marketed by Sony. Part of the Xperia X series, the device was announced to the public along with the Xperia XZ Premium at the annual Mobile World Congress last February 2017.

The device's highlight feature is its capability of capturing slow-motion videos at 960 frames per second, a world's first in a compact smartphone.

== Hardware ==
=== Design and Build ===
The Xperia XZs' design is exactly the same "Loop Surface" design as the previous-gen flagship, the Xperia XZ, save for the raised lens "hump" with a beveled edge surround for the new Motion Eye camera. It consists of 3 different materials: a nylon frame, scratch-resistant front glass panel made of Corning Gorilla Glass 5, and an aluminium alloy metal back. The subtly-curved rear cover is made from ALKALEIDO alloy, trademarked by Kobe Steel, finished in a matte-like texture that gives a distinct shine when hit by a light source, complementing the smartphone's recognizable shape that debuted with the Xperia XZ. The front houses the 5.2-inch LCD flanked by the dual front-firing stereo speakers; one on the top bezel along with the 13 MP front selfie camera, ambient light and proximity sensors and notification LED; and the other one at the bottom bezel. The top of the device houses the 3.5 mm headphone jack with a 2nd microphone pinhole adjacent to it; the bottom has the USB Type-C port and primary microphone.

The hybrid SIM tray lives on the top-left side of the device, with a sealed pull-out type cover for added ingress protection. The right-hand side houses the fingerprint reader, positioned along the middle as with previous Xperia devices, though it is deactivated in the US due to patent disputes. Directly below that is the volume rocker, and below it near the bottom edge is the 2-stage camera shutter button.

The device's dimensions are also exactly the same as the previous flagship, 146 mm (5.7 in) in height, with a width of 72 mm (2.8 in) and a depth of 8.1 mm (0.32 in) and weighs approximately 161 g (5.7 oz) even with the new camera setup.

=== Display and Performance ===
The Xperia XZs sports a 5.2 in (130 mm) 1080p Full-HD IPS LCD, with a pixel density of 424 ppi and featuring Sony's TRILUMINOS™ display technology and X-Reality for mobile built-in. Unlike the more upscale Xperia XZ Premium, the Xperia XZs is powered by the same quad-core Qualcomm Snapdragon 820 (MSM8996) chipset and Adreno 530 GPU that came with the Xperia XZ, with 4 custom Kryo processors in a 2 + 2 configuration (2x 2.15 GHz and 2x 1.6 GHz), but is now upgraded to a 4 GB LPDDR4 RAM instead of the previous 3 GB for an added performance boost. The device also has an internal storage of 32 GB for the single-SIM variant and 64 GB for the dual-SIM variant, both are LTE Cat. 9-enabled. It also has a microSD card expansion of up to 256 GB (in a hybrid slot for the dual-SIM variant).

== Camera ==
=== Sony IMX400 ===
Sony debuted in the Xperia XZs and the XZ Premium the world's first 3-layer stacked image sensor with DRAM for smartphones. Known internally as the IMX400, the new Exmor RS for mobile sensor features a DRAM chip sandwiched in-between the sensor array and control circuitry layers, serving as a large and fast memory buffer to the sensor, where it can temporarily store a significant amount of captured data before transferring it to the device's internal memory for processing. This enables the camera sensor to record the highlight super slow-motion videos at a frame rate of 960 fps practically unheard of in a smartphone before. Recording at super slow motion is only limited to 0.18 seconds per buffer (about a blink of an eye) and at 720p HD resolution though, due to limitations. This specific limitation also requires a very bright light source directly on to the subject, or a well-lit scene or surrounding for a more noise-less and much brighter video capture.

=== Motion Eye™ ===
The Xperia XZs is the first of the two new models to launch the now officially called Motion Eye™ camera. It has a 19 MP 1/2.3” Exmor RS for mobile sensor with a 1.22 μm pixel pitch, f/2.0 aperture and 25mm wide G Lens. It also features 4K video recording, which supports SteadyShot video stabilization alongside the standard 1080p/30fps and high-speed 1080p/60fps and a 120fps recording in 720p options. The front selfie camera has a 13 megapixel sensor (1/3.06") with 22 mm, f/2.0 lens and 90 degree wide angle lens, same as the Xperia XZ but now features SteadyShot™ with Intelligent Active Mode (5-axis stabilization) like on the XZ Premium.

The Motion Eye™ camera also showcases a new and unique feature, called Predictive Capture. When the camera detects a fast-paced movement, it automatically buffers up to a maximum of 4 frames before the shutter button is pressed, and lets the user select the best one or keep all the captured frames afterward. This is done by a machine learning algorithm, all without any user intervention, and is possible thanks to the same built-in DRAM chip on the IMX400 sensor used in capturing its unique 960 fps super slow-motion videos.

=== Triple Image Sensing ===
The Motion Eye™ camera is also backed up by Sony's Triple Image Sensing technology first introduced in the Xperia XZ. It is composed of the Image sensing (CMOS sensor with PDAF), Distance sensing (Laser AF sensor) and Color sensing (RGBC-IR color spectrum sensor) systems. The sensor has a hybrid autofocus that utilizes Phase Detection (PDAF), which locks focus on a subject within 0.03 seconds, and also includes phase and contrast detection along with predictive motion tracking. It also has a laser autofocus sensor for faster object tracking and focus compared to regular autofocus modes, and an RGBC-IR (RedGreenBlueClear-InfraRed) color spectrum sensor assisting the white balance function of the camera by simply providing additional data about the lighting conditions of the surrounding environment or scene. The camera also benefits from SteadyShot with Intelligent Auto in addition to the five-axis sensor-shift image stabilization for a more stable and shake-free video recording.

== Battery ==
The Xperia XZs is powered by the same non-removable 2900 mAh lithium-ion battery as the Xperia XZ, with a USB-C USB 2.0 port (compared to the XZ Premium's USB 3.1), with support for Qualcomm QuickCharge 3.0. It also has Qnovo adaptive charging technology built-in, which allows the device to monitor the battery cell's electrochemical processes in real time, and adjusts charging parameters accordingly to minimize cell damage and extend the battery cell's lifespan.

=== Battery Care ===
It also comes with Battery Care, Sony's proprietary charging algorithm, that controls the charging process of the phone through machine learning. It recognizes the user's charging habits for a certain period and automatically adjusts itself to the pattern, for example an overnight charge, by stopping the initial charging to about 90 percent, and then continuing it until full from where it left off the next day. This effectively prevents the unnecessary damage to the battery's cells from excessive heat and current due to overcharging, further increasing the battery's life span.

== Audio and Connectivity ==
The Xperia XZs comes with the standard 3.5 mm audio jack for plugging in wired headphones. It also has LDAC, an audio coding technology developed in-house by Sony,(which is now part of the Android Open Source Project as of 2018), that enables the transmission of 24bit/96 kHz High-Resolution (Hi-Res) audio content over Bluetooth at up to 990 kbit/s.

And just like the Xperia XZ, the XZs has the standard set of connectivity options: Bluetooth 4.2 with aptX and Low Energy, NFC, dual-band Wi-Fi a/b/g/n/ac with 2x2 MIMO antennas for speeds up to 433 Mbit/s, Wi-Fi Direct and hotspot, screen casting via Miracast, Google Cast and DLNA, GPS and A-GPS, GLONASS and BeiDou satellite positioning. The Xperia XZs has no FM radio.

== Software ==
The Sony Xperia XZs was launched with Android 7.1.1 Nougat out of the box, and is upgradeable to Android 8.0 Oreo.
