= Sony Xperia XZ Premium =

Android smartphone by Sony

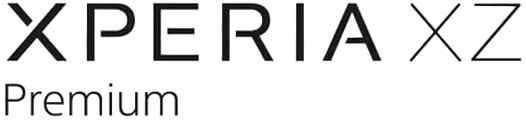

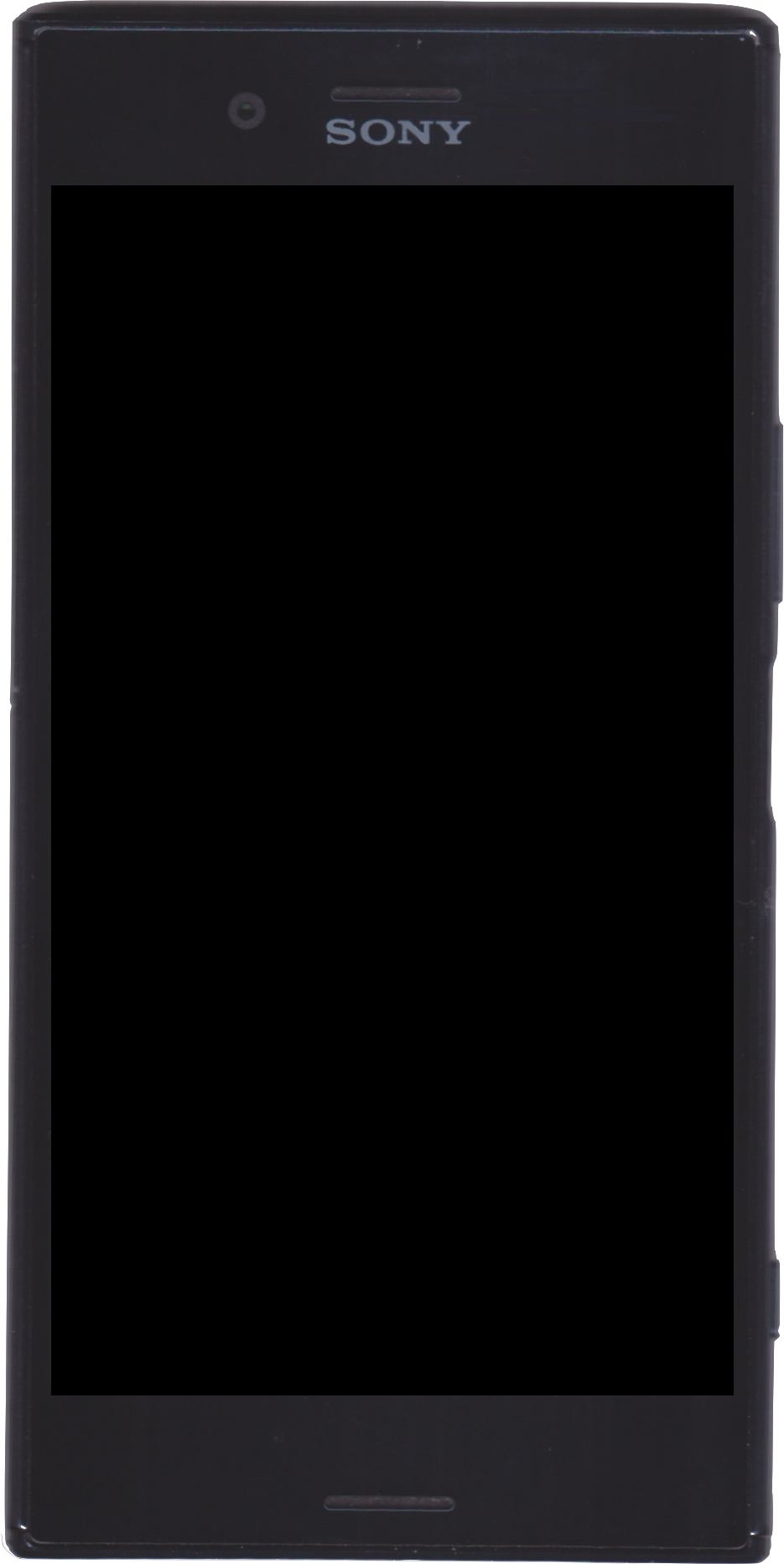
- Brand: Sony
- Manufacturer: Sony Mobile Communications
- Type: Phablet smartphone
- Series: Sony Xperia
- First released: 2 June 2017; 9 years ago (United Kingdom)
- Availability by region: 2 June 2017; 9 years ago (United Kingdom); 16 June 2017; 9 years ago (Japan, SO-04J model exclusively for NTT DoCoMo); 19 June 2017; 9 years ago (United States); July 2017; 9 years ago (Japan, G8188 unlocked model sold by Nuro mobile)
- Predecessor: Sony Xperia Z5 Premium
- Successor: Sony Xperia XZ2 Premium
- Related: Sony Xperia XZ; Sony Xperia XZs
- Compatible networks: HSPA, GSM & LTE
- Form factor: Slate
- Dimensions: 156 mm (6.1 in) H 77 mm (3.0 in) W 7.9 mm (0.31 in) D
- Weight: 191 g (6.7 oz)
- Operating system: Android 7.1.1 "Nougat"; Upgradable to Android 9 "Pie"
- System-on-chip: Qualcomm Snapdragon 835 MSM8998
- CPU: Octa-core (quad 2.45 GHz + quad 1.9 GHz) 64-bit Kryo 280 processor
- GPU: Adreno 540
- Memory: 4 GB LPDDR4X RAM
- Storage: 64 GB UFS 2.1
- Removable storage: microSDXC; expandable up to 512 GB (hybrid slot for G8142)
- Battery: Non-removable Li-ion 3,230 mAh
- Rear camera: 19 MP Motion Eye™ Camera, 1/2.3'' memory-stacked IMX400 image sensor, Exmor RS for mobile (1.22μm), BIONZ, RGBC-IR, Laser AF, Predictive Hybrid AF, Predictive Capture, Quick launch, 5x Clear Image Zoom, 25mm Wide Angle G Lens, f/2.0 4K (2160p) video recording, 720p 960 fps super slow motion video recording, SteadyShot with Intelligent Active Mode (5-axis stabilization)
- Front camera: 13 MP 1/3.06'' Exmor RS for mobile sensor, with Quick launch and 22mm Wide Angle Lens and f/2.0 aperture, autofocus
- Display: 5.46 in (139 mm) 4K HDR IPS LCD (3840 x 2160 px); TRILUMINOS Display for mobile with X-Reality for mobile, Dynamic Contrast Enhancement, sRGB 138%, 806 ppi
- Connectivity: Wi-Fi; DLNA; GPS/GLONASS/BeiDou/Galileo; Bluetooth 5 with aptX and LE; USB 3.1 (Type-C port, USB charging, Quick Charge 3.0); 1seg (G8188 and SO-04J models only); Osaifu-Keitai (G8188 and SO-04J models only)
- Data inputs: Multi-touch, capacitive touchscreen, proximity sensor
- Model: Single SIM: G8141, G8188, SO-04J; Dual SIM: G8142
- Codename: Maple (PF11)
- Website: Official Website

The Sony Xperia XZ Premium is an Android smartphone manufactured and marketed by Sony. As part of the Xperia X series, the device was announced to the public along with the Xperia XZs at the annual Mobile World Congress in February 2017. Pre-orders for the Xperia XZ Premium started in Europe on 22 May 2017. The device went on sale in the UK on 2 June 2017, and in the US on 19 June 2017.

It supersedes the Xperia Z5 Premium and it was Sony's latest flagship after the Xperia XZ and before Sony Xperia XZ2.

Notable features include a 4K HDR ultra-high resolution display and slow-motion video capture at 960 frames per second.

== Hardware ==
=== Design and Build ===
The Xperia XZ Premium refines the Xperia XZ's "Loop Surface" design with its "Glass Loop Surface", consisting of a nylon side frame, metal top and bottom edges that together make up the chassis of the phone, and scratch-resistant front and back glass panels made of Corning's Gorilla Glass 5. The top and bottom part of the chassis are flat and diamond-cut along the edge to form a reflective facet. The most defining change in the XZ Premium, as well as the XZ1, is the placement of the image sensors on the back. It is now placed across the camera lens and slightly off-center, as opposed to being placed longitudinally below the lens like on the XZs. The NFC antenna is at the center part of the rear glass panel, just below the "XPERIA" nameplate. The front of the phone consists of dual front-firing stereo speakers, one on the top bezel and the other on the bottom bezel, along with a 13 MP front camera, ambient light sensor, proximity sensor and notification LED.

The Xperia XZ Premium's dimensions are 156 mm (6.1 in) in height, with a width of 77 mm (3.0 in) and a depth of 7.9 mm (0.31 in) and weighs approximately 195 g (6.9 oz). It has an IP rating of IP68, making it dustproof and water-resistant for over 1.5 meters and 30 minutes underwater. The device also features a fingerprint sensor embedded into the power button that can be used to unlock the phone and secure it from unauthorized access. This feature, however, is disabled on units sold in the US.

=== Display and Performance ===
The Xperia XZ Premium is the second phone with a 4K (2160p) display, the first one being the Xperia Z5 Premium. But unlike the latter, the Xperia XZ Premium has a 4K HDR display, making it the first smartphone to feature such a display. It is HDR10 compliant, but has no Dolby Vision support. The 5.5 in (140 mm) IPS LCD screen has a pixel density of 806 ppi when rendered in 4K resolution and features Sony's TRILUMINOS display and X-Reality for mobile technology.

It is powered by the Qualcomm Snapdragon 835 (MSM8998), Built on 10 nm process technology with 8 custom Kryo 280 processors (4x 2.45 GHz and 4x 1.9 GHz), 4 GB of LPDDR4X RAM and uses the Adreno 540 GPU for graphics rendering. The device also has an internal storage of 64 GB and comes in single-SIM and dual-SIM versions, with both featuring LTE Cat. 16 with 3x carrier aggregation, a 4×4 MIMO antenna design and a total of 8 antennas. It also has microSD card expansion of up to 512 GB (in a hybrid slot. for the dual-SIM variant).

=== Camera ===
Sony debuted in the Xperia XZs and the XZ Premium the world's first 3-layer stacked image sensor with DRAM for smartphones. Known internally as Sony IMX400, the new ExmorRS sensor features a RAM chip sandwiched in between the sensor and control circuitry layers which serves as a large and fast buffer to where the sensor can temporarily offload a significant amount of captured data before transferring it to the phone's internal memory for processing. This enables the camera to record super slow-motion videos at 960 fps, at a steady 720p resolution. Recording at super slow motion is limited to 0.18 seconds per buffer, due to limitations.

Officially called Motion Eye, the Xperia XZ Premium has a 19 MP 1/2.3" Exmor RS for mobile sensor with a 1.22 μm pixel pitch, f/2.0 aperture and 25 mm wide G Lens. It also features 4K video recording, which supports Steady Shot video stabilization alongside the standard 1080p/30 fps and high-speed 1080p/60fps and a 120 fps recording in 720p options. The front selfie camera has a 13 megapixel sensor (1/3.06") with 22 mm, f/2.0 lens and 90-degree wide angle lens, same as the Xperia XZ but now features Steady Shot with Intelligent Active Mode (5-axis stabilization) like on the XZs.

The Xperia XZ Premium has Sony's Triple Image Sensing technology, first introduced in the Xperia XZ as standard. It is composed of the Image sensing (CMOS sensor with PDAF), Distance sensing (Laser AF sensor) and Color sensing (RGBC-IR sensor) systems, featuring a hybrid autofocus that utilizes Phase Detection (PDAF) to lock focus on a subject within 0.03 seconds. It also includes phase and contrast detection along with predictive motion tracking, and a laser autofocus sensor for fast tracking and focus-locking on an object, as well as an RGBC-IR (red, green, blue, clear – infrared) color sensor that assists the white balance function of the camera by providing additional data about the light conditions of the surrounding environment. It also has Steady Shot with Intelligent Auto, in addition to the five-axis sensor-shift image stabilization first seen in the Xperia XZ.

The Motion Eye camera also has a new feature called Predictive Capture. When it detects fast-paced movement, the camera automatically captures a maximum of four photos before the shutter button is pressed, and lets the user select the best one afterwards. This is done without any user intervention and is possible due to the same built-in RAM chip on the image sensor used in capturing the 960 fps super slow-motion videos.

In November 2017, after receiving user feedback, a software update within the camera features menu was released, titled "Correction for image distortion".

The camera received a DxOMark score of 83.

=== Battery ===
The Xperia XZ Premium is powered by a non-removable, 3230 mAh battery. Charging and data transfer is handled by a USB-C port with support for USB 3.1. It also has Qualcomm's Quick Charge 3.0 and Qnovo adaptive charging technology built-in. This allows the device to monitor the cell's electrochemical processes in real time and adjust charging parameters accordingly to minimize cell damage and extend the battery unit's lifespan. It also comes with Battery Care, a Sony proprietary feature, that controls the charging process of the phone by learning and recognizing the user's charging patterns, preventing the phone from damaging the battery's cells from excessive heat due to overcharging. For example, when charging overnight, Battery Care stops the initial charge to 90 percent and then continue charging until full where it left off the next day.

=== Audio and Connectivity ===
The Xperia XZ Premium comes with a standard 3.5 mm audio jack for plugging in wired headphones. It also has LDAC, an audio coding technology developed by Sony, That enables the transmission of 24-bit/96 kHz High-Resolution (Hi-Res) audio content over Bluetooth at up to 990 Kbit/s, three times faster than conventional audio streaming codecs, to compatible audio devices. Other connectivity options include Bluetooth 5 with aptX and Low Energy, NFC, dual-band Wi-Fi a/b/g/n/ac with 2×2 MIMO antennas, Wi-Fi Direct, MirrorLink, screen casting via Miracast, Google Cast, DLNA, GPS (with A-GPS), GLONASS, BeiDou and Galileo satellite positioning. The Xperia XZ Premium has no FM radio.

== Software ==
=== Stock software ===
The Sony Xperia XZ Premium launched with Android 7.1.1 Nougat along with Smart Stamina battery saving modes and Sony's proprietary multimedia apps. Android 8.0 Oreo started rolling out in late-October 2017. Android 9 Pie was rolled out for the XZ Premium in February 2019.

=== Custom ROMs ===
The Xperia XZ Premium, codenames "maple" and "maple_dsds" (Dual SIM variant), allows for bootloader unlocking and custom ROM installs. Degoogled ROMs can bring the phone up to Android 13 and include LineageOS with microG and CarbonROM, based on Android 10.

== Variants ==
XZ Premium variants list
Model	Bands	Regions	References
G8141 (Single SIM)	GSM: 850, 900, 1800, 1900 MHz UMTS: 800, 850, 900, 1700/2100 (AWS), 1900, 2100 MHz LTE: Bands 1, 2, 3, 4, 5, 7, 8, 12, 13, 17, 19, 20, 26, 28, 29, 32, 38, 39, 40, 41	Europe (except CIS), North America (except US), Oceania, South America, Vodacom South Africa	
G8142 (Dual SIM)	GSM: 850, 900, 1800, 1900 MHz UMTS: 800, 850, 900, 1700/2100 (AWS), 1900, 2100 MHz LTE: Bands 1, 2, 3, 4, 5, 7, 8, 12, 13, 17, 19, 20, 26, 28, 29, 32, 38, 39, 40, 41	Africa, Asia (outside Japan), Europe (including CIS), Middle East, US (unlocked)	
G8188 (Single SIM)	GSM: 850, 900, 1800, 1900 MHz UMTS: 800, 850, 900, 1900, 2100 MHz LTE: Bands 1, 2, 3, 4, 5, 7, 12, 13, 17, 19, 21, 28, 38, 39, 40, 41, 42	Japan (Nuro mobile MVNO unlocked model)	
SO-04J (Single SIM)	GSM: 850, 900, 1800, 1900 MHz UMTS: 800, 850, 900, 1900, 2100 MHz LTE: Bands 1, 2, 3, 4, 5, 7, 12, 13, 17, 19, 21, 28, 38, 39, 40, 41, 42	Japan (NTT DoCoMo carrier model)	
