= Sony Xperia Z2 =

Android Smartphone by Sony Xperia

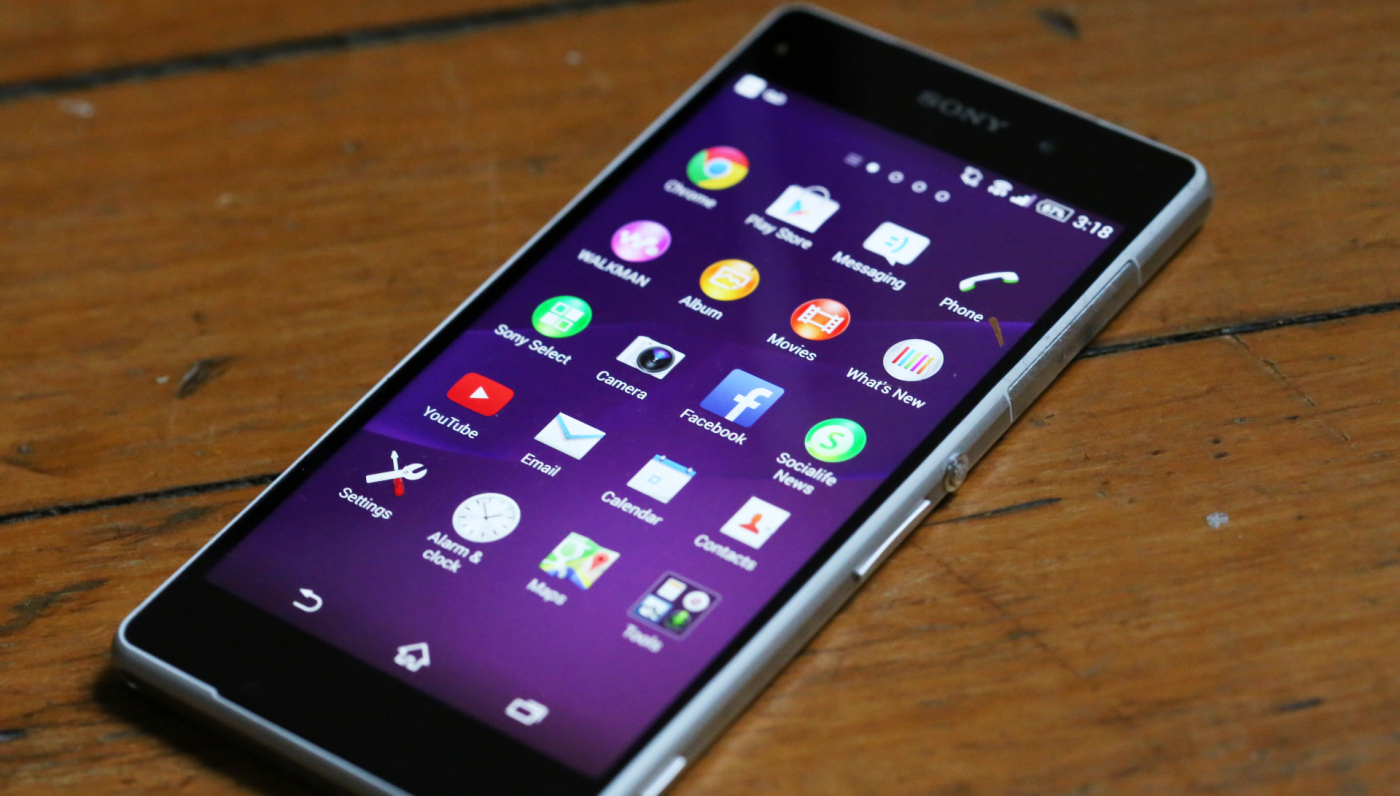
- Brand: Sony
- Manufacturer: Sony Mobile Communications
- Type: Touchscreen-based smartphone
- Series: Sony Xperia
- First released: March 24, 2014; 12 years ago
- Availability by region: March 24, 2014; 12 years ago (Taiwan) March 27, 2014; 12 years ago (China, L50t model exclusively for China Mobile) April 5, 2014; 12 years ago (Singapore) May 1, 2014; 12 years ago (Australia, United Kingdom) May 2, 2014; 12 years ago (China, L50u model exclusively for China Unicom) May 5, 2014; 12 years ago (Canada) May 12, 2014; 12 years ago (India) May 17, 2014; 12 years ago (Hong Kong, Indonesia, Malaysia) May 19, 2014; 12 years ago (New Zealand) May 21, 2014; 12 years ago (Japan, SO-03F variant exclusively for NTT DoCoMo) July 21, 2014; 12 years ago (United States)
- Predecessor: Sony Xperia Z1
- Successor: Sony Xperia Z3
- Related: Sony Xperia Z Sony Xperia Z1; Sony Xperia Z Ultra; Sony Xperia Z2 SO-03F (Japan)
- Compatible networks: D6502: UMTS HSPA+ 850 (Band V), 900 (Band VIII), 1700 (Band IV), 1900 (Band II), 2100 (Band I) MHz; GSM GPRS/EDGE 850, 900, 1800, 1900 MHz. D6503: UMTS HSPA+ 850 (Band V), 900 (Band VIII), 1700 (Band IV), 1900 (Band II), 2100 (Band I) MHz; GSM GPRS/EDGE 850, 900, 1800, 1900 MHz; LTE (Bands 1, 2, 3, 4, 5, 7, 8, 13, 17, 20). D6543: UMTS HSPA+ 850 (Band V), 900 (Band VIII), 1700 (Band IV), 1900 (Band II), 2100 (Band I) MHz; GSM GPRS/EDGE 850, 900, 1800, 1900 MHz; LTE (Bands 1, 2, 3, 4, 5, 7, 8).
- Form factor: Slate
- Dimensions: 146.8×73.3×8.2 mm (5.78×2.89×0.32 in)
- Weight: 163 g (6 oz)
- Operating system: Android 4.4.2 KitKat (Launch); Android 4.4.4 KitKat; Android 5.0.2 Lollipop (last version for SO-03F); Android 5.1.1 Lollipop; Android 6.0.1 Marshmallow (current)
- System-on-chip: Qualcomm Snapdragon 801
- CPU: 2.3 GHz quad-core Krait (2.3 GHz Qualcomm MSM8974AB Quad Core)
- GPU: Adreno 330
- Memory: 3 GB RAM
- Storage: 16 GB (32 GB for SO-03F variant)
- Removable storage: Up to 128 GB microSDXC
- Battery: Non-user removable Li-ion 3200 mAh
- Rear camera: Sony G Lens 20.7 MP 1/2.3" Exmor RS IMX220 back-side illuminated sensor with BIONZ™ Engine for mobile image processor and LED flash 2160p video recording @ 30 frames/s 1080p video recording @ 30/60 frames/s 720p video recording @ 30/120 frames/s
- Front camera: 2.2 MP (1080p video recording)
- Display: 5.2 in (130 mm) diagonal IPS LCD; Full HD 1920x1080 px BRAVIA TRILUMINOS Display with Sony Live Color LED; X-Reality Engine for Mobile
- Connectivity: Wi-Fi; DLNA; GPS/GLONASS; NFC; Bluetooth 4.0; MHL 3.0; USB 2.0 (Micro-B port, USB charging); USB OTG; 3.50 mm (0.138 in) headphone jack, 5 pole
- Data inputs: Multi-touch, capacitive touchscreen, proximity sensor
- Model: D6502, D6503, D6543, L50t, L50u, SO-03F
- Codename: Sirius
- Other: Available in black, purple and white IP55 / IP58 (Dust protected, Water jet protected & Waterproof); Digital Noise cancellation Sony Exmor R for Mobile; Sony Exmor RS for Mobile; Sony G Lens; 1/2.3 Aperture sensor Sony BIONZ image processor SteadyShot; Smile shutter SensMe; TrackID; Sony Entertainment Network; PlayStation App; Remote Play; 1seg (SO-03F variant only); Miracast; Sony Sketch; Magnetic charge port Osaifu-Keitai (SO-03F variant only); NOTTV (SO-03F variant only); POBox Plus (SO-03F variant only)
- Website: Official website

The Sony Xperia Z2 is an Android-based smartphone unveiled, manufactured, and marketed by Sony and was released in April 2014. Under the codename “Sirius”, Xperia Z2 serves as the successor to the Sony Xperia Z1. Like its predecessor, the Xperia Z2 is water and dustproof, with an IP rating of IP55 and IP58. The phone features an IPS LED display, a Snapdragon 801 processor and the ability to record 4K videos. The Xperia Z2 also allows removable microSD storage up to 128 GB.

The Xperia Z2 was unveiled alongside the Sony Xperia Z2 Tablet and the Sony Xperia M2 during the 2014 Mobile World Congress in Barcelona, Spain, on February 24, 2014, and was first released in Taiwan on March 24, 2014, in Singapore on April 5, 2014, and entered more markets between April and May 2014. In the United States, the Xperia Z2 was released unlocked through the Sony Store on July 21, 2014.

Many reviewers praised the phone's screen, camera and waterproof design, but criticized its size and camera software issues that cause the device to overheat when recording 4K video for extended periods. There was at least one reported case of a Z2 exploding due to overheating in the uk, which resulted in legal action being taken against Sony. Sony denied any responsibility.

== Design ==
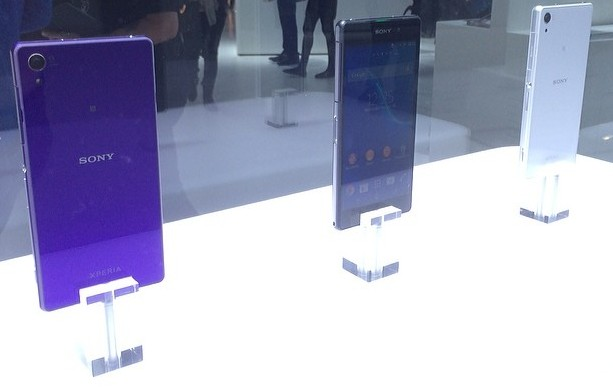
Purple, black, and white colour options

Similar to other devices under the Sony Xperia Z series, the Xperia Z2 has an "Omni-Balance", according to Sony, which is focused on creating balance and symmetry in all directions. The phone comes with the same aluminium frame as its predecessor. It also features tempered glass on the front and back, with an aluminium power button placed on the right-hand side of the device.

== Specifications ==
=== Hardware ===
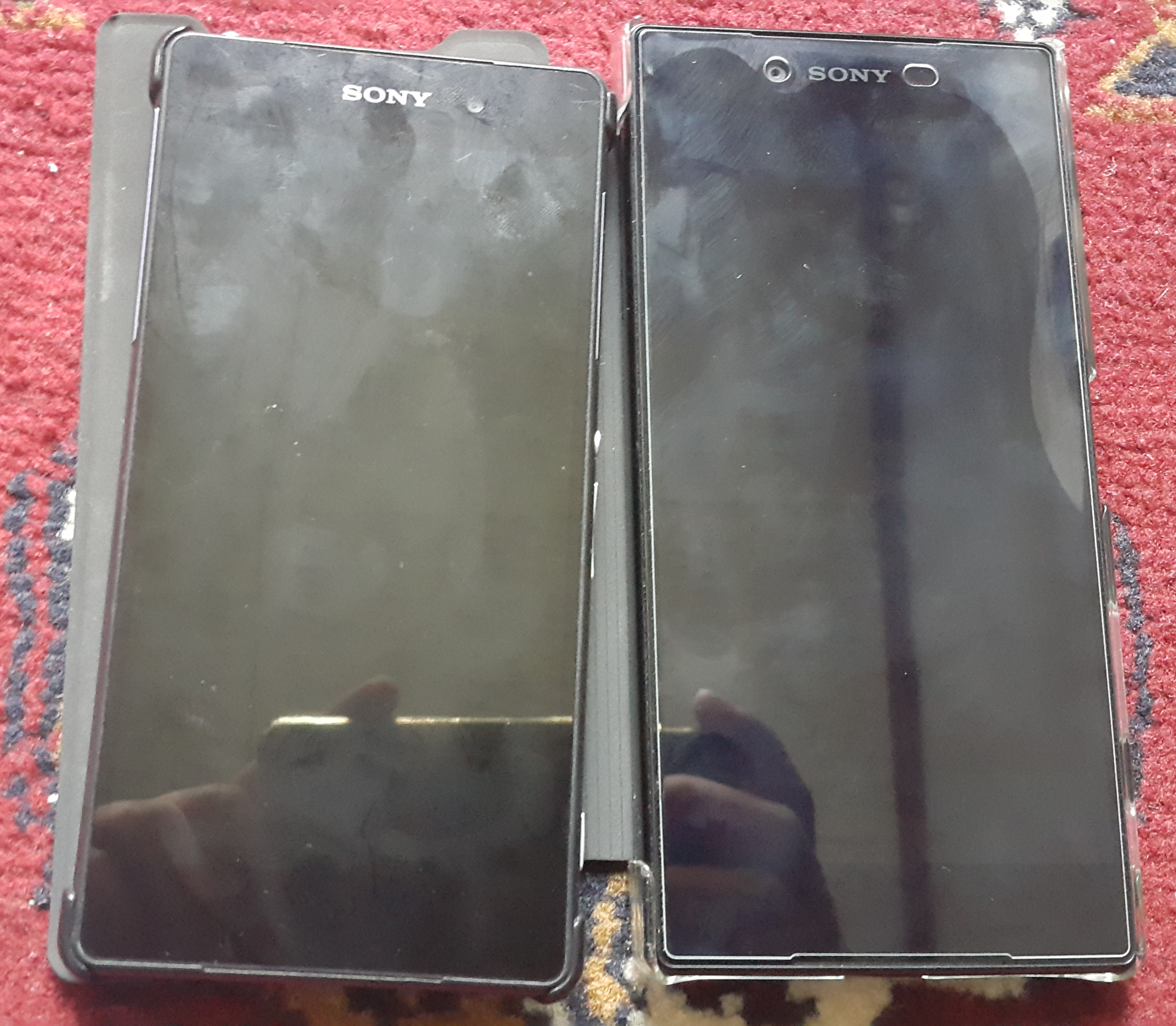
Sony Xperia Z2 And Z5

The Sony Xperia Z2 features a 5.2-inch BRAVIA IPS LCD Triluminos display with a resolution of 1080 by 1920 pixels (Full HD) with a pixel density of 424 ppi. Additionally, display features such as Live Color LED technology reproduces richer colours and more uniform backlighting as compared to the Sony Xperia Z1. It has a large 1/2.3" 20.7 megapixel camera with Sony's in-house G lens with Sony BIONZ for mobile image processor and Exmor RS for mobile image sensor. The camera is capable of HDR and 4K video recording. It also supports 4K video output via MHL 3.0. It also features a front-facing camera of 2.2 megapixels. The phone is available in three different colors, black, purple, and white.

The device is equipped with multicolour LED-backlit stereophonic speakers.

On the inside, the Xperia Z2 features a slightly tweaked Snapdragon 800 processor (known as Snapdragon 801) clocked at 2.3 GHz sealed with a high capacity 3200 mAh battery, 3 GB of RAM with 16 GB (11.57 GB user accessible, as shown on the device) internal storage and has microSD, microSDHC, and microSDXC support up to 128 GB (note that SD card can be used for app storage under android Lollipop v5.0.2 and later). The Xperia Z2 is lighter and also thinner than its predecessor, weighing at 163 g and measuring 146.8 × 73.3 × 8.2 mm. For connectivity, the phone supports NFC, Bluetooth 4.0, DLNA and FM radio. It also supports –DUALSHOCK 4. The ability to connect an external USB device is a feature otherwise known as USB OTG which the Xperia Z2 also supports. Digital noise cancellation technology is also built into the phone which works by using the headsets included with the phone.

=== Software ===
The Xperia Z2 originally ran the Android 4.4.2 “KitKat” operating system with Sony's custom launcher and some applications additions, such as Sony's media applications including Walkman (currently updated to Music), Album and Videos. With NFC on the Xperia Z2, it allows 'screen mirroring' — which mirrors what is on the smartphone screen to compatible TVs — and play music over-the-air on NFC-enabled speakers. Screen recording (Screencasting) was implemented in it years ahead of stock Android, and accessible from the power button menu.

The device also includes Sony's battery stamina mode, which extends the phone's standby up to 4 times. Several Google applications (such as Google Chrome, Google Play, Google Search and Voice, Google Maps, and Google Talk) are also preloaded onto the phone. New features added to the software includes 'Smart Backlight' — which keeps the phone display on for as long as the user is looking at it — and 'Glove Mode'.

The 2160p (4K) video resolution is implemented as a separate camera mode in the camera software rather than integrated in the video resolution selector.

Sony announced on their blog that the whole Xperia Z series will be getting the Android 5.0 “Lollipop” update. While the update was planned to be carried out at the start of 2015, the roll-out to the Xperia Z2 did not begin until 7 April 2015. The update in the United Kingdom rolled out on 16 April 2015. The Android 5.1 update was carried out on 21 July 2015.

Sony announced on their blog that the Xperia Z2 will receive the Android 6.0.1 Marshmallow update after the release of Xperia Z5. Subsequently, on 9 April 2016 the update was officially rolled out to the Xperia Z2.

The Xperia Z2 was not among the Sony's list of Xperia models that will be receiving the Android 7.0 Nougat update.

== Marketing ==
In June 2014, the Xperia Z2 was announced as the “official smartphone” of the 2014 FIFA World Cup. In Sweden, customers who purchased the phone also received one of Sony's wearable devices, the Sony SmartBand SWR10.

== Variants ==
Model	FCC id	Carriers/regions	GSM bands	UMTS bands	LTE bands	Notes
D6502		Worldwide				
D6503		Worldwide			1, 2, 3, 4, 5, 7, 8, 13, 17, 20	
D6543		Brazil			1, 2, 3, 4, 5, 7, 8	

All variants support four 2G GSM bands 850/900/1800/1900 and five 3G UMTS band 850/900/1700/1900/2100.

== Reception ==
Like its predecessor, the Sony Xperia Z2 received mostly positive reviews. CNET's reviewer Andrew Hoyle gave the phone a 4.5 stars out of 5, praising its screen, camera and waterproof design. Vlad Savov from The Verge heaped praise on the Xperia Z2's battery life, and the well-built and waterproof design, while criticizing the phone's camera software and its size. John McCann of TechRadar applauded the camera's features, as well as its stylish screen and the battery life, while devoting his criticism towards the phone for being slow at some times, the large bezel design and 4K recording problems. Linus Sebastian of LinusTechTips referred to the Z2 as "Basically the Z1 but with the big glaring issue (The TN panel) gone".

== Successor ==
The successor to the Xperia Z2, the Sony Xperia Z3, was unveiled at IFA 2014 on September 4, 2014.

== See also ==
- Sony Xperia Z1
- Sony Xperia Z series

Preceded by Sony Xperia Z1	Sony Xperia Z2; 2014	Succeeded by Sony Xperia Z3
