= Au Xperia Z4 SOV31 =

2015 smartphone model

Xperia Z4 SOV31
- Brand: au
- Developer: Sony Mobile
- Manufacturer: Sony Mobile
- Type: Smartphone
- Series: Sony Xperia Z series
- Family: Xperia
- First released: June 11, 2015; 11 years ago
- Predecessor: Xperia ZL2 SOL25
- Successor: Xperia Z5 SOV32
- Compatible networks: 3.9G: FDD-LTE (au VoLTE) (700 MHz/New 800 MHz/2 GHz); 3G: W-CDMA (850 MHz/2 GHz); 2G: GSM (1.9 GHz/1.8 GHz/900 MHz)
- Form factor: Bar
- Colors: White; Black; Copper; Aqua Green
- Dimensions: 146 mm (5.7 in) H 72 mm (2.8 in) W 6.9 mm (0.27 in) D
- Weight: Approx. 144 g (5.1 oz)
- Operating system: Android 5.0, upgradable to 7.0
- System-on-chip: Qualcomm Snapdragon 810 (MSM8994)
- CPU: Octa-core (4×2.0 GHz & 4×1.5 GHz)
- GPU: Adreno 430
- Memory: 3 GB LPDDR4 RAM
- Storage: 32 GB eMMC
- Removable storage: microSD (up to 2 GB), microSDHC (up to 32 GB), microSDXC (up to 128 GB) (officially supported by KDDI)
- SIM: Nano-SIM
- Battery: 2930 mAh (non-removable)
- Charging: Approx. 140 minutes
- Rear camera: 20.7 megapixels, backside-illuminated stacked CMOS image sensor (Exmor RS for mobile), face detection autofocus, 4K UHD video recording, image stabilization, Timeshift video, AR effect
- Front camera: 5.1 megapixels, CMOS image sensor (Exmor R for mobile), face detection autofocus, 4K UHD video recording, image stabilization, Timeshift video, AR mask
- Display: 5.2 in (130 mm) TFT Triluminos Display for mobile, FHD (1920 × 1080 pixels), approx. 16.77 million colors
- Water resistance: IPX5/IPX8 waterproofing, IP6X dustproofing
- Model: SOV31

The Xperia Z4 SOV31 is a smartphone developed by Sony Mobile. It was released for the Japanese domestic market by KDDI and Okinawa Cellular Telephone Company under the au brand, featuring support for 3.9G (au 4G LTE / au VoLTE) and 4G (au 4G LTE CA / WiMAX 2+) mobile communication systems.

== Overview ==
On June 11, 2015, the Japanese telecommunications carrier KDDI launched the Sony Xperia Z4 (model number SOV31) as part of its summer product lineup. While the device was released across all three major Japanese carriers—with NTT Docomo launching its version on June 10 and SoftBank on June 12—the core hardware specifications remained uniform across all variants.

At launch, the outright purchase price of the SOV31 on the au Online Shop was 84,240 JPY. KDDI offered a monthly discount program ("Maitsuki Wari") totaling up to 41,040 JPY (distributed as 1,710 JPY per month over 24 months). For Mobile Number Portability (MNP) customers, an additional discount of 16,200 JPY was applied under a two-year contract. Consequently, the net effective price was 43,200 JPY for new contracts and upgrades, and 27,000 JPY for MNP transfers.

Furthermore, the device was eligible for the "au Kaeru Wari Plus" campaign; under this promotion, MNP customers subscribing to eligible contracts could receive either two years of waived basic monthly fees (under legacy plans) or a cashback bonus of 10,000 JPY (under newer plans).

It was upgradable to Android 7.0 Nougat on March 30, 2017.
