= TrackID =

Music identification application

- Developer(s): Sony Mobile Communications
- Initial release: 2005
- Platform: Android, Symbian, Wear OS
- Website: trackid.sonymobile.com

TrackID was a mobile music and audio search engine for Sony Ericsson (now Sony Mobile) feature phones, Android devices and some Sony television sets. TrackID was developed by Sony Mobile and allowed users to identify music using Gracenote's music database. Gracenote was acquired by Sony in 2008. The acquisition was completed on June 2, 2008. The revised Android application was released in March 2015.

The service has been present on select Sony Ericsson handsets since around 2005.

TrackID was discontinued by Sony Mobile on 15 September 2017 and Sony recommended that users install Shazam to 'continue discovering music'.
