= List of 4K video recording devices =

List of devices that can record 4K video

4K resolution is a generic term to refer to any horizontal display resolution of approximately 4,000 pixels. Several different 4K resolutions have been standardized by various organizations, including 4096 × 2160 for digital cinematography, and 3840 × 2160 for digital television.

This is a list of devices which can record video in 4K resolution. As digital video authoring systems could be considered re-recording systems, these should be included.

== Professional cameras ==
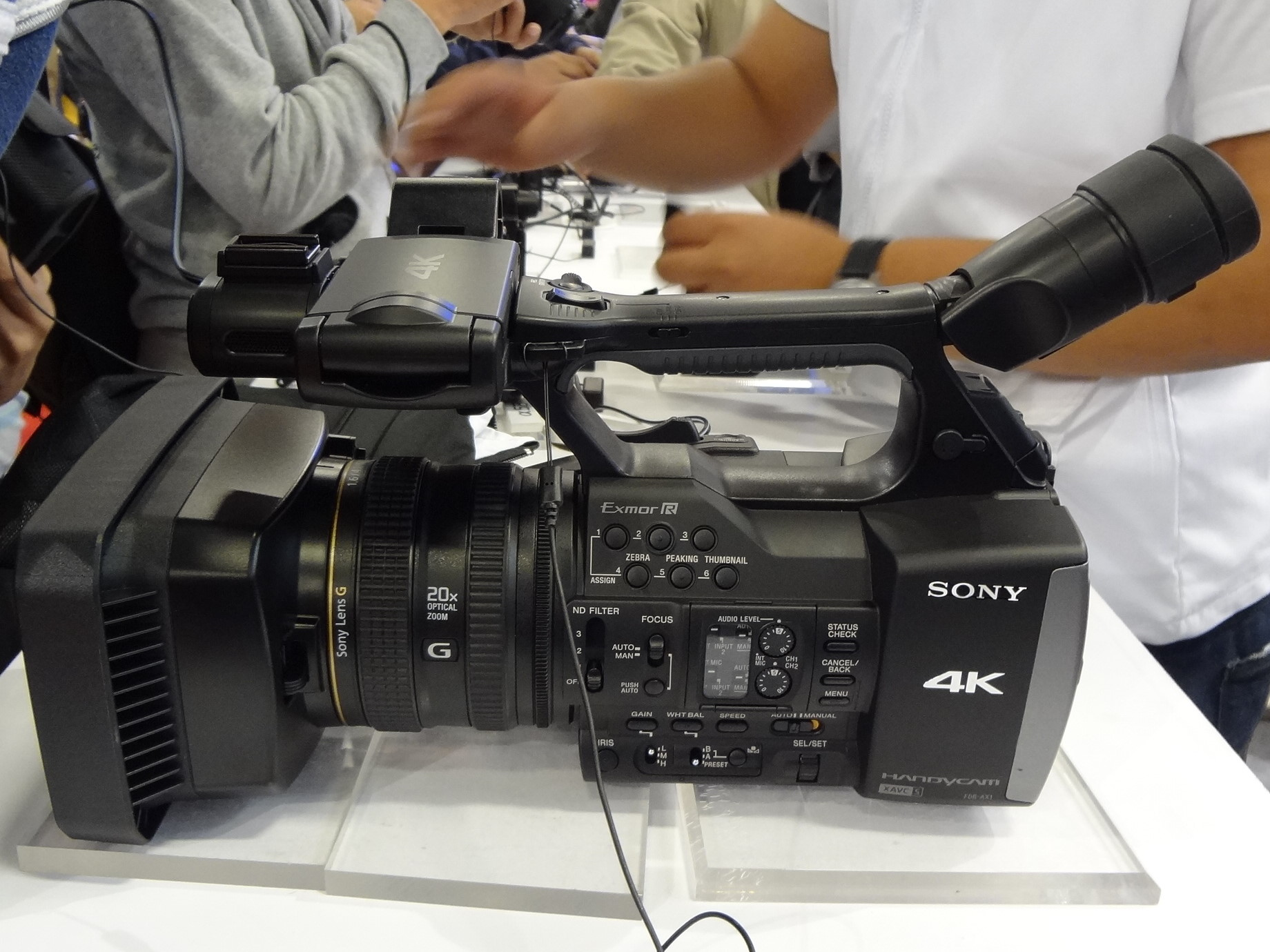
Sony Handycam FDR-AX1

- Arri Alexa
- Astrodesign AH-4413 – released in 2012 and records at 3840×2160 (8.3 megapixels)
- AXIOM is an open source hardware modular camera that allows users to swap sensors. For research and development the ams Sensors Belgium CMV12000 was used, which allows the camera to record up to 300 fps (10 bit), 132 fps (12 bit) at 4K Resolution
- Blackmagic Pocket Cinema Camera 6k
- Blackmagic Pocket Cinema Camera 4k
- Blackmagic URSA
- Blackmagic Micro Studio Camera 4K
- Blackmagic Production Camera 4K – announced April 8, 2013
- Canon EOS C50
- Canon EOS C70
- Canon EOS C80
- Canon EOS C200
- Canon EOS C300 Mark II
- Canon EOS C300 Mark III
- Canon EOS C400
- Canon EOS C500 – released in 2012 and records in DCI 4K
- Canon EOS C500 Mark II
- Canon EOS C700
- Canon EOS C700 FF
- Dalsa Origin – released in 2003 and records at 4096×2048 (8.3 megapixels). The Dalsa Origin II is no longer available. Dalsa discontinued the Digital Cinema division in 2008. The Origin II was available via a rental-only model similar to Panavision.
- FOR-A FT-ONE – records 4K at up to 900 FPS
- JVC GY-HMQ10 – released in 2012 and records at UHD 4K (3840×2160, 8.3 megapixels)
- Panasonic HC-X1000, 2014 – capable to record in 4K (3840 × 2160) and Cinema 4K (4096 × 2160), 60p/50p, 20× optical zoom, built-in ND filter.
- Panasonic HC-X1500, 2020
- Panasonic HC-X2000, 2020
- Panasonic DVX-200 – 4k 60fps
- Point Grey FL3-U3-88S2C-C 8.8 MP Color USB 3.0 – released in 2012 and records at DCI 4K (the framerate is limited to 21 fps)
- RED EPIC – released in 2011 and records at 5K RAW (5120×2700 13.8 megapixels) & DCI 4K (4096×2160, 8.8 megapixels)
- RED Scarlet-X – released in November 2011
- RED ONE – released in 2007 and records at 4096×2304 (11.5 megapixels)
- Sony F65
- Sony F5
- Sony F55
- Sony VENICE
- Sony Handycam FDR-AX1
- Sony XDCAM PXW-Z100
- Vision Research Phantom 65 - no longer in production
- Vision Research Phantom Flex 4K - records 4K @ up to 1000 FPS - previewed on April 8, 2013

== DSLRs and Mirrorless cameras ==
Blackmagic Design

- Blackmagic Pocket Cinema Camera 6k
- Blackmagic Pocket Cinema Camera 4k

Canon

- Canon EOS-1D C DSLR – Released in 2012 and records at DCI 4K
- Canon EOS-1D X Mark II – 60p Introduced in Feb 2016
- Canon EOS-1D X Mark III – First Full Frame Canon DSLR to feature full sensor width 4K readout, and also first Canon camera to record in HEVC codec
- Canon EOS 5D Mark IV - Full Frame with 4K introduced in August 2016
- Canon EOS M6 Mark II
- Canon EOS M50
- Canon EOS M200
- Canon EOS 90D – First APS-C Canon DSLR to feature full sensor width 4K readout
- Canon EOS 850D
- Canon EOS 250D
- Canon EOS R (1.8x crop)
- Canon EOS RP (1.8x crop)
- Canon EOS R1
- Canon EOS R3
- Canon EOS R5
- Canon EOS R5 C
- Canon EOS R5 Mark II
- Canon EOS R6
- Canon EOS R6 Mark II
- Canon EOS R6 Mark III
- Canon EOS R6 V
- Canon EOS R7
- Canon EOS R8
- Canon EOS R8 Mark II
- Canon EOS R10
- Canon EOS R50
- Canon EOS R50 V
- Canon EOS R100

Fujifilm

- Fujifilm GFX100
- Fujifilm GFX100 II
- Fujifilm GFX100RF
- Fujifilm GFX100S
- Fujifilm GFX100S II
- Fujifilm X-A7
- Fujifilm X-E3
- Fujifilm X-E4
- Fujifilm X-E5
- Fujifilm X-H1
- Fujifilm X-H2
- Fujifilm X-H2S
- Fujifilm X-M5
- Fujifilm X-S10
- Fujifilm X-S20
- Fujifilm X-T100 – 4K/15p
- Fujifilm X-T2
- Fujifilm X-T3 - released in 2018 as the first Fujifilm camera to record in HEVC codec
- Fujifilm X-T4
- Fujifilm X-T5
- Fujifilm X-T20
- Fujifilm X-T30
- Fujifilm X-T30 II
- Fujifilm X-T30 III
- Fujifilm X-T50

Leica

- Leica CL
- Leica SL (Typ 601)
- Leica SL2
- Leica SL2-S
- Leica SL3
- Leica SL3-S
- Leica TL2

Nikon

- Nikon D5 - 30p Introduced in Jan 2016
- Nikon D6
- Nikon D500 - 30p Introduced in Jan 2016
- Nikon D780
- Nikon D7500
- Nikon D850
- Nikon 1 J5 (limited to 15 FPS)
- Nikon Z5 (1.7x crop)
- Nikon Z5II
- Nikon Z5IIC
- Nikon Z6
- Nikon Z6II
- Nikon Z6III
- Nikon Z7
- Nikon Z7II
- Nikon Z8
- Nikon Z9
- Nikon Z50
- Nikon Z50II
- Nikon Z30
- Nikon Zf
- Nikon Zfc
- Nikon ZR

Olympus Corporation / OM Digital Solutions

- Olympus OM-D E-M1 Mark II
- Olympus OM-D E-M1 Mark III
- Olympus OM-D E-M1X
- Olympus OM-D E-M5 Mark III
- Olympus OM-D E-M10 Mark III
- Olympus OM-D E-M10 Mark IV
- Olympus PEN E-P7
- Olympus PEN E-PL9
- Olympus PEN E-PL10
- OM System OM-1
- OM System OM-1 Mark II
- OM System OM-3
- OM System OM-5
- OM System OM-5 Mark II
- OM System PEN

Panasonic

- Panasonic Lumix DMC-G7 - 30 min limit
- Panasonic Lumix DMC-G85/G80 - No time limit in 4K recording and in body image stabilisation (Europe version has 30 min limit)
- Panasonic Lumix DC-G9
- Panasonic Lumix DC-G9 II
- Panasonic Lumix DC-G95/G90/G91
- Panasonic Lumix DC-G97
- Panasonic Lumix DMC-GH4 – Records in 4K: 4096×2160 / 24p and QFHD (UHD) 4K: 3840×2160 / 25p/30p, up to 100 Mbit/s (IPB), HD (All Intra up to 200 Mbit/s/IPB 100 Mbit/s) only prosumer device with 10-bit hdmi out and no maximum internal 4k recording time limit
- Panasonic Lumix DC-GH5 - 4K60/50p (4:2:0 8bit) & 4K30/25p/24p (4:2:2 10bit) internal recording, up to 4K60 4:2:2 10bit external recording via HDMI
- Panasonic Lumix DC-GH5S
- Panasonic Lumix DC-GH6
- Panasonic Lumix DC-GH7
- Panasonic Lumix DMC-GX8 - No time limit in 4K recording and in body image stabilisation (Europe version has 30 min limit)
- Panasonic Lumix DMC-GX85/GX80
- Panasonic Lumix DC-S1, released 2019
- Panasonic Lumix DC-S1M2
- Panasonic Lumix DC-S1M2E
- Panasonic Lumix DC-S1R
- Panasonic Lumix DC-S1RII
- Panasonic Lumix DC-S5, released 2021 – 4K 60fps (200 Mbit/s with HEVC, 150 Mbit/s H.264); DCi 4K at 30fps (150 Mbit/s; 4:2:2 chroma subsampling);
- Panasonic Lumix DC-S5 II
- Panasonic Lumix DC-S9

Pentax

- Pentax K-3 III - 30p Introduced in March 2021

Samsung

- Samsung NX1 - First prosumer camera to record in HEVC, 4K downsampled from 6.5K, 80 Mbit/s in H.265. 30 min max recording time limit
- Samsung NX500 - Same 28 MP APS-C sensor as NXI but 4K video is not downsampled from 6.5K so less details and more noise than the NX1 - with this 2.4× crop factor the kit lens become a 38–120mm f8.5–13.4 equivalent for depth of field; 15 min max recording time limit

Sigma

- Sigma BF
- Sigma fp

Sony

- Sony α6100
- Sony α6300 - APS-C camera with internal 4K recording up to 100 Mbit/s. The camera uses a 20 MP (6K) region of the sensor to offer 2.4× oversampled 4K video with full pixel readout, and no pixel binning.
- Sony α6400
- Sony α6500
- Sony α6600
- Sony α6700
- Sony α1
- Sony α1 II
- Sony α7 III
- Sony α7 IV
- Sony α7 V
- Sony α7C
- Sony α7C II
- Sony α7CR
- Sony α7R II - Full Frame 42 Megapixel Sensor, but only 100 Mbit/s in H.264 and the APS-C crop mode is better for 4K than the full frame mode
- Sony α7R III
- Sony α7R IV
- Sony α7R V
- Sony α7R VI
- Sony α7S - 4K: 30p/24p, 4:2:2 8 bits. Does not support internal 4K recording, must use an external recorder via HDMI, but see Sony α7S II. Only 1080p is recorded internally.
- Sony α7S II - Full Frame with internal 4K recording
- Sony α7S III
- Sony α9 - XAVC S 4K: 3840 x 2160 (30p/25p/24p), 4:2:0 8bit
- Sony α9 II
- Sony α9 III - First full frame mirrorless camera with a global shutter.
- Sony α99 II
- Sony FX2
- Sony FX3
- Sony FX5
- Sony FX30
- Sony RX1R III
- Sony ZV-E1
- Sony ZV-E10
- Sony ZV-E10 II

== Consumer video cameras ==
- Canon XC10, 2015
- Canon VIXIA HF G70 / LEGRIA HF G70 – a compact 4K UHD camcorder with 4:2:0 8-bit MP4 recording, 20× optical zoom, dual SD card slots and HDMI output.
- Sony Handycam

 ** FDR-AX100, 2014
 ** FDR-AXP33, 2015, with built-in projector
 ** FDR-AX53, 2016
 ** FDR-AXP53, 2016, with built-in projector
 ** FDR-AX43A – records at 4K (3840 × 2160), with Dual Video Rec allowing simultaneous lower-resolution MP4 recording for sharing.[20]

- Panasonic

 ** HC-WX970, 2015
 ** HC-VX870, 2015
 ** HC-VXF990, 2016
 ** HC-VX980, 2016
 ** HC-VX1 – a 4K Ultra HD camcorder using a 1/2.5-inch BSI MOS sensor with 24× optical zoom.[21]

- DJI Osmo Pocket 3 – a compact gimbal camera with normal 4K recording at up to 60 fps and 4K slow-motion recording at 120 fps.

== Consumer cameras (no interchangeable lens) ==
- Panasonic Lumix DMC-FZ300
- Panasonic Lumix DMC-FZ1000
- Panasonic Lumix DMC-LX100 – announced at photokina 2014
- Nikon Coolpix A900
- Nikon Coolpix B700
- Nikon Coolpix P1000
- Sony DSC-RX10 II (30 min max in 4K)
- Sony DSC-RX100 IV (5 min max recording due to heat)
- Sony RX100 VII – records 4K (3840 × 2160) video using full pixel readout without pixel binning and supports XAVC S recording up to 100 Mbit/s.
- Canon PowerShot G7 X Mark III – supports 4K video recording and includes a 3.5 mm microphone input.

== Mobile devices ==
=== Below 30 frames per second ===
- Panasonic Lumix DMC-CM1 – 15 frames per second
- Acer Liquid S2 - The first 4K camera in a mobile device – 24fps

=== 30 frames per second ===
Samsung Mobile

- Samsung Galaxy Note 3 (2013) (Note: Limited to 5 minutes each 4K video) (Snapdragon model) – The first mobile phone with 2160p at 30fps.
- Samsung Galaxy S5 (2014) – The first Samsung Galaxy S series mobile phone with 2160p video recording
- Samsung Galaxy Alpha (Note: Limited to 4 minutes each 4K video)
- Samsung Galaxy Note 4 (and Samsung Galaxy Note Edge)
- Samsung Galaxy S6 / Galaxy S6 Edge / Galaxy S6 Edge+
- Samsung Galaxy Note 5
- Samsung Galaxy S7 / Galaxy S7 Edge
- Samsung Galaxy Note 7 / Galaxy Note Fan Edition (Note: Limited to 10 minutes each 4K video)
- Samsung Galaxy S8 / Galaxy S8+
- Samsung Galaxy Note 8
- Samsung Galaxy A8 Star (2018) – First Galaxy A-series device with 4K recording.
- Samsung Galaxy A9 (2018)
- Samsung Galaxy A70
- Samsung Galaxy A80
- Samsung Galaxy A90 5G
- Samsung Galaxy A51 / Galaxy A71
- Samsung Galaxy M51/Galaxy M31/Galaxy M21
- Samsung Galaxy F41
- Samsung Galaxy A52/Galaxy A72
- Samsung Galaxy F62
- Samsung Galaxy M62/Galaxy M42 5G
- Samsung Galaxy A53 5G/Samsung Galaxy A33 5G/Samsung Galaxy A73 5G
- Samsung Galaxy A54/ Galaxy A34

Apple iPhone

- Apple iPhone 6S / iPhone 6S Plus (2015) – The first iPhones to record in 4K.
- Apple iPhone SE (2016) – same camera as Apple iPhone 6s
- Apple iPhone 7 / 7 Plus
- Apple iPhone 8 / 8 Plus
- Apple iPhone X
- Apple iPhone XR / XS / XS Max
- Apple iPhone 11 / 11 Pro / 11 Pro Max
- Apple iPhone SE (2nd generation)
- Apple iPhone 12 / 12 mini / 12 Pro / 12 Pro Max
- Apple iPhone 13 / 13 mini / 13 Pro / 13 Pro Max
- Apple iPhone SE (3rd generation)
- Apple iPhone 14 / 14 Plus / 14 Pro / 14 Pro Max
- Apple iPhone 15 / 15 Plus / 15 Pro / 15 Pro Max
- Apple iPhone 16 / 16 Plus / 16 Pro / 16 Pro Max

Fairphone

- Fairphone 4
- Fairphone 5

Google Nexus and Google Pixel

- Google Nexus 6
- Google Nexus 6P
- Google Nexus 5X
- Google Pixel / Pixel XL
- Google Pixel 2 / Pixel 2 XL
- Google Pixel 3 / Pixel 3 XL
- Google Pixel 3a / Pixel 3a XL
- Google Pixel 4 / Pixel 4 XL
- Google Pixel 4a / Pixel 4a (5G)

LG

- LG G3 (2014) – Earliest known optically stabilized mobile 2160p video camera.
- LG G4
- LG G5
- LG G6
- LG G Flex (2014) – through subsequent software update
- LG G Flex 2
- LG G Pro 2
- LG V10
- LG V20
- LG V30 – 4K HDR (8-bit Log from 10-bit signal, can not record in 10 bit at all.)
- LG Velvet

Nokia Lumia and Microsoft Lumia

- Nokia Lumia 930 – through subsequent software update
- Nokia Lumia Icon
- Nokia Lumia 1520 – through subsequent software update
- Microsoft Lumia 950
- Microsoft Lumia 950 XL
- Nokia 7+ Rear camera up to 4k@30fps

Motorola

- Motorola Moto X (2nd generation)
- Motorola Moto X Style
- Motorola Droid Turbo
- Motorola Nexus 6

OnePlus and Oppo

- OnePlus One – the first mobile device to support recording at both 4096 × 2160@24fps (DCi-4K or Full4K) and 3840 × 2160@30fps
- OnePlus 2
- OnePlus 3
- OnePlus 3T
- OnePlus 5
- OnePlus 5T
- OnePlus 6
- OnePlus 6T
- OnePlus 7 and 7 Pro
- OnePlus 7T and 7T Pro
- Oppo A9 2020
- Oppo Find 7/7a

Sony Xperia

- Sony Xperia Z Ultra
- Sony Xperia Z1 and Z1 Compact
- Sony Xperia Z2
- Sony Xperia A2
- Sony Xperia J1 Compact
- Sony Xperia ZL2
- Sony Xperia Z2a
- Sony Xperia Z3 and Z3 Compact
- Sony Xperia Z4 and Z4 Compact
- Sony Xperia A4
- Sony Xperia Z5, Z5 Premium and Z5 Compact
- Sony Xperia M5
- Sony Xperia XZ / XZ Dual and XZs
- Sony Xperia XZ Premium, XZ1 and XZ1 Compact
- Sony XPeria XZ2, XZ2 Premium, XZ3 and XZ2 Compact – World's first "4K HDR" recording on a phone. Can be deactivated optionally.
- Sony Xperia 1 and 5
- Sony Xperia 1 II

Xiaomi

- Xiaomi Mi 3 (using unofficial/modded software)
- Xiaomi Mi 4
- Xiaomi Mi 5 and Mi 5s
- Xiaomi Mi 6
- Xiaomi Mi 8
- Xiaomi Mi 9,
- Xiaomi Mi 9T and Mi 9T Pro
- Xiaomi Mi 10
- Xiaomi Mi 10T and Mi 10T Pro
- Xiaomi Mi A1
- Xiaomi Mi A2
- Xiaomi Mi A3
- Xiaomi Redmi Note 3 (Snapdragon model)
- Xiaomi Redmi Note 4 (using third party camera apps)
- Xiaomi Redmi Note 5
- Xiaomi Redmi Note 6
- Xiaomi Redmi Note 7
- Xiaomi Redmi Note 8
- Xiaomi Redmi Note 9 Pro
- Xiaomi Redmi Note 9
- Xiaomi Redmi Note 10 pro
- Xiaomi Poco X3 NFC
- Xiaomi Poco F1
- Xiaomi Poco F2 Pro / Redmi K30 Pro

Huawei

- Huawei P10 and P10 Plus
- Huawei P20 and P20 Pro
- Huawei Mate 9, Mate 9 Pro and Mate 9 Porsche Design edition
- Huawei Mate 10, Mate 10 Pro and Mate 10 Porsche Design edition
- Huawei Nova 3

Other vendors

Vendors with only few listed devices

- BlackBerry Priv
- HTC One M9 (Note: Limited to 6 minutes each 4K video)
- HTC 10
- Lenovo Vibe Z2 Pro
- Meizu MX4 Pro
- Meizu MX4
- Razer Phone 2
- Sharp SH-01G

=== 60 frames per second ===
Samsung Mobile

- Samsung Galaxy S9 / Galaxy S9+ - Capable of recording at 4K@60 or 30fps with official support from Samsung.
- Samsung Galaxy Note 9 - Capable of recording at 4K@60 or 30fps with official support from Samsung.
- Samsung Galaxy S10e / Galaxy S10 / Galaxy S10+ / Galaxy S10 5G
- Samsung Galaxy Note 10 / Galaxy Note 10+ / Galaxy Note 10 5G / Galaxy Note 10+ 5G
- Samsung Galaxy S10 Lite
- Samsung Galaxy S20 / Galaxy S20+ / Galaxy S20 Ultra / Galaxy S20 5G / Galaxy S20+ 5G / Galaxy S20 Ultra 5G - First phone to record 8K resolution at 24fps
- Samsung Galaxy Note 20 / Galaxy Note 20 Ultra / Galaxy Note 20 5G / Galaxy Note 20 Ultra 5G
- Samsung Galaxy S20 FE
- Samsung Galaxy S21 / Galaxy S21+ / Galaxy S21 Ultra
- Samsung Galaxy S21 FE
- Samsung Galaxy S22 / Galaxy S22+ / Galaxy S22 Ultra
- Samsung Galaxy S23 / Galaxy S23+ / Galaxy S23 Ultra
- Samsung Galaxy S23 FE

Apple iPhone

- Apple iPhone 8 / iPhone 8 Plus and iPhone X, 4K@60, 30 or 24fps with official support from Apple.
- Apple iPhone XS / iPhone XS Max and iPhone XR
- Apple iPhone 11 and iPhone 11 Pro / iPhone 11 Pro Max
- Apple iPhone SE (2nd generation) - same camera as iPhone 8
- Apple iPhone 12 / iPhone 12 Mini and iPhone 12 Pro / iPhone 12 Pro Max
- Apple iPhone 13/ IPhone 13 Mini and iPhone 13 Pro / iPhone 13 Pro Max
- Apple iPhone 14 / iPhone 14 Plus and iPhone 14 Pro / iPhone 14 Pro Max
- Apple iPhone 15 / iPhone 15 Plus and iPhone 15 Pro / iPhone 15 Pro Max
- Apple iPhone 16 / iPhone 16 Plus
- Apple iPhone 16 Pro / iPhone 16 Pro Max first iPhone to record in 4K in slow motion
- Apple iPhone 16e
- Apple iPhone 17 and iPhone Air
- Apple iPhone 17e

Asus

- Asus Zenfone 5Z
- Asus Zenfone 6
- Asus ROG Phone II
- Asus ROG Phone III

Google Pixel

- Google Pixel 5
- Google Pixel 5a
- Google Pixel 6 / Pixel 6 Pro
- Google Pixel 6a
- Google Pixel 7 / Pixel 7 Pro - First multi-lens phone to permit lens switching while recording at 60 FPS
- Google Pixel 7a
- Google Pixel Fold
- Google Pixel 8 / Pixel 8 Pro
- Google Pixel 8a
- Google Pixel 9 / Pixel 9 Pro / Pixel 9 Pro XL
- Google Pixel 9 Pro Fold
- Google Pixel 9a

Huawei

- Huawei P40 series or later
- Huawei Mate 30 series or later
- Huawei Mate Xs or later
- Honor V30 series
- Honor 30 Pro/Pro+

Infinix

- Infinix GT 20 Pro

LG

- LG G7 ThinQ
- LG G8 ThinQ
- LG G8X ThinQ
- LG G8S ThinQ
- LG V35
- LG V40
- LG V50
- LG V60

Xiaomi

- Xiaomi Mi 10 5G
- Xiaomi Mi 10T and Mi 10T Pro
- Poco F1
- Poco F2 Pro / Redmi K30 Pro

OnePlus

- OnePlus 6 or later

Realme

- Realme GT Neo
- Realme GT
- Realme X3/X3 Superzoom
- Realme Q3 Pro

=== 120 frames per second ===
Sony Xperia

- Sony Xperia 1 II or later
- Sony Xperia 5 II or later

OnePlus

- OnePlus 9 Pro or later (5 minutes only)

ZTE

- ZTE Nubia Z40 Pro or later
- ZTE Axon 40 Ultra or later

ASUS

- Asus ZenFone 7 or later (slow motion only)

Samsung Galaxy

- Samsung Galaxy S24 / Galaxy S24+ (4K at 120 fps in slow motion)
- Samsung Galaxy S24 FE (4K at 120 fps in slow motion)
- Samsung Galaxy S24 Ultra
- Samsung Galaxy S25 / Galaxy S25+ (4K at 120 fps in slow motion)
- Samsung Galaxy S25 FE (4K at 120 fps in slow motion)
- Samsung Galaxy S25 Ultra
- Samsung Galaxy S25 Edge (4K at 120 fps in slow motion)
- Samsung Galaxy S26 / Galaxy S26+ / Galaxy S26 FE (4K at 120 fps in slow motion)
- Samsung Galaxy S26 Ultra

Apple iPhone

- iPhone 16 Pro / iPhone 16 Pro Max
- iPhone 17 Pro / iPhone 17 Pro Max
- iPhone 18 Pro / iPhone 18 Pro Max
- iPhone Duo

== Rugged Compact Cameras ==
- Olympus Tough TG-5

== Wearable and action cameras ==
- GoPro HERO3 Black Edition (2012) – 4K at 15 fps and DCI 4K at 12 fps, fixed "Ultra Wide" field of view
- GoPro HERO3+ Black Edition – 4K at 15 fps and DCI 4K at 12 fps, fixed "Ultra Wide" field of view
- GoPro HERO4 Black Edition – 4K at up to 30 fps
- GoPro HERO5 Black Edition – 4K at up to 30 fps
- GoPro HERO6 Black Edition – 4K at up to 60 fps
- GoPro HERO7 Black Edition – 4K at up to 60 fps
- GoPro HERO13 Black – records 5.3K at 60 fps, 4K at 120 fps, 2.7K at 120 fps and 1080p at 240 fps.
- DJI Osmo Action 5 Pro – records 4K in 16:9 or 4:3 aspect ratios at up to 120 fps.
- Insta360 Ace Pro 2 – records 8K at up to 30 fps and 4K at up to 120 fps in 16:9 video mode.
- Nikon KeyMission 170 – 4K at 30 fps
- YI 4K+ – 4K at up to 60 fps and electronic image stabilization at 4K 30 fps
- Sony Action Cam FDR-X3000R
- RealAction Pro

== See also ==
- 1080p (Full HD) – digital video format with a resolution of 1920 × 1080, with vertical resolution of 1080 lines
- 1440p (WQHD) – vertical resolution of 1440 lines
- List of 4K video recording devices
- 2K resolution – digital video formats with a horizontal resolution of around 2,000 pixels
- 5K resolution – digital video formats with a horizontal resolution of around 5,000 pixels, aimed at non-television computer monitor usage
- 6K resolution – digital video formats with a horizontal resolution of around 6,000 pixels, aimed at non-television computer monitor usage
- 8K resolution – digital video formats with a horizontal resolution of around 8,000 pixels
- 10K resolution – digital video formats with a horizontal resolution of around 10,000 pixels
- 16K resolution – experimental VR format
- 32K resolution
- Aspect ratio (image) – proportional relationship between an image's width and height
- Digital cinema
- Display resolution standards
- High Efficiency Video Coding (HEVC) – video standard that supports 4K & 8K UHDTV and resolutions up to 8192 × 4320
- Rec. 2020 – ITU-R recommendation for UHDTV, defining formats with resolutions of 4K (3840 × 2160) and 8K (7680 × 4320)
- Ultrawide formats
- 4K resolution
