= Xperia XZ2 Compact =

Android smartphone by Sony

Sony Xperia XZ2 Compact

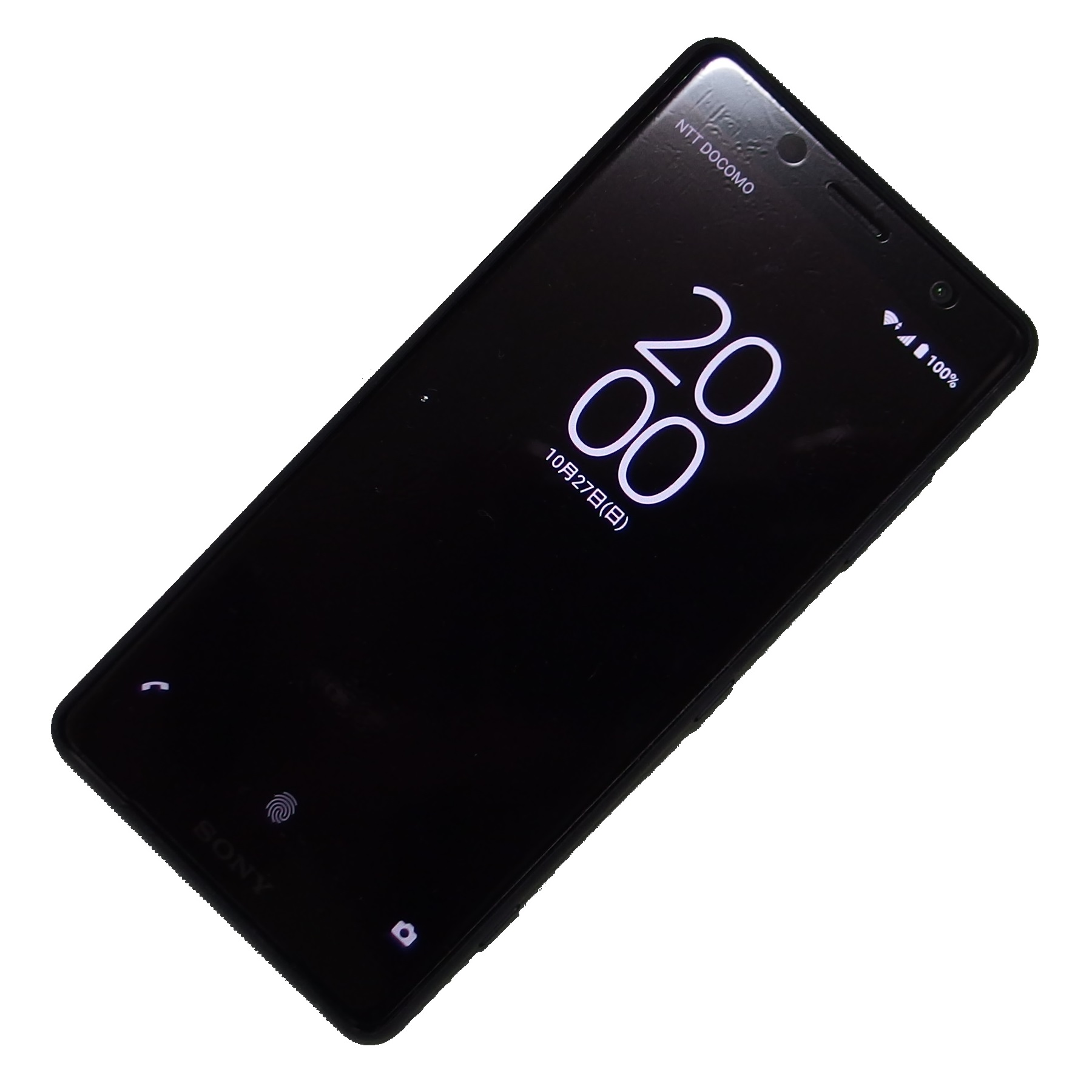
- Brand: Sony
- Manufacturer: Sony Mobile Communications
- Type: Smartphone
- Series: Sony Xperia
- First released: 5 April 2018; 8 years ago
- Predecessor: Sony Xperia XZ1 Compact
- Successor: Sony Xperia Ace; Sony Xperia 5 (indirect)
- Related: Sony Xperia X Compact; Sony Xperia Z5 Compact
- Compatible networks: 2G; 3G; 4G; 4G LTE
- Form factor: Slate
- Dimensions: 135 mm (5.3 in) H 65 mm (2.6 in) W 12.1 mm (0.48 in) D
- Weight: 168 g (6 oz)
- Operating system: Android 8.0 "Oreo" (Upgradable to Android 10)
- System-on-chip: Qualcomm Snapdragon 845
- CPU: Octa-core (4x2.7 GHz Kryo 385 Gold & 4x1.7 GHz Kryo 385 Silver)
- GPU: Adreno 630
- Memory: 4 GB LPDDR4X RAM
- Storage: 64 GB
- Removable storage: microSD, expandable up to 400 GB
- Battery: Non-removable 2870 mAh
- Rear camera: 19 MP (f/2.0, 25mm, 1/2.3", 1.22 μm), gyro EIS, predictive phase detection and laser AF, LED flash, 4K at 30fps, 1080p at 30, 60fps or 960fps slo-mo
- Front camera: 5 MP (f/2.2, 23mm, 1/5"), gyro EIS, 1080p
- Display: 5.0 in (130 mm) Full HD+ (1080 x 2160) IPS LCD, ~483 pixel density, Gorilla Glass 5
- Sound: Stereo speakers
- Connectivity: Wi-Fi 802.11 a/b/g/n/ac (2.4/5 GHz) Bluetooth 5.0, USB-C, NFC, location (GPS, Galileo, GLONASS, BeiDou)
- Data inputs: Sensors: Accelerometer; Barometer; Fingerprint scanner (rear-mounted); Gyroscope; Proximity sensor
- Model: SO-05K PM-1131-BV (Docomo); H8314 PM-1132-BV (single SIM); H8324 PM-1130-BV (dual SIM)
- Codename: Apollo (PF32)
- Website: Official Website

The Sony Xperia XZ2 Compact is an Android smartphone manufactured and marketed by Sony. Part of the Xperia X series, the device was announced to the public along with the Xperia XZ2 at a press conference held at the annual 2018 Mobile World Congress event on February 26, 2018.

== Hardware ==
=== Design and Build ===
The Xperia XZ2 Compact comes with the new "Ambient Flow" design, replacing the outdated "OmniBalance" that had been in use since 2013 with curvy corners. It consists of a new 7000-series aluminum alloy chassis that has a curved edge all around the device, plastic back, and 2.5D scratch-resistant front and made of Corning's Gorilla Glass 5, resulting in a symmetric and curvier design aesthetic. The most defining change in the Xperia XZ2 Compact, as well as the Xperia XZ2 Premium and XZ2, is the placement of the camera on the back. It is now symmetrically arranged on the top-center of the device, as opposed to being placed on the top left side like on previous Xperia smartphones. The NFC antenna is placed along the Triple Image Sensing System, the MotionEye camera module and the now US-enabled fingerprint sensor, symmetrically aligned near the top-center axis of the device. The front houses the improved dual front-firing stereo speakers, one on the top bezel along with a 5 MP front camera, ambient light and proximity sensor and notification LED, and the other on the bottom bezel in an elongated slit along the edge of the glass and frame.

The Xperia XZ2 Compact's dimensions are 135 mm (5.3 in) in height, with a width of 65 mm (2.6 in) and a depth of 12.1 mm (0.48 in) and weighs approximately 168 g (5.9 oz). The device comes in 4 colors: Liquid Black, Liquid Silver, Deep Green and Ash Pink.

=== Performance ===
The Xperia XZ2 Compact is powered by the Qualcomm Snapdragon 845, built on a 10 nm process technology with 8 custom Kryo 385 processors (4x 2.7 GHz and 4x 1.7 GHz), 4/6 GB of LPDDR4X RAM and uses the Adreno 630 for graphics rendering. The device also has an internal storage of 64 GB and comes in single-SIM and dual-SIM versions, with both featuring LTE Cat. 16 with 3x carrier aggregation, a 4x4 MIMO antenna design with a total of 8 antennas. It also has microSD card expansion of up to 512 GB in a hybrid SIM 2 slot setup.

== Camera ==
=== MotionEye ===
Sony debuted in the Xperia XZs and the XZ Premium the world's first three-layer stacked image sensor with DRAM for smartphones. Known as the Sony IMX400, the sensor features a RAM chip sandwiched in between the sensor and control circuitry layers which serves as a large and fast buffer to where the sensor can temporarily offload a significant amount of captured data before transferring it to the phone's internal memory for processing. This enables the camera to record super slow-motion videos at 960 fps, at a steady 720p resolution. Recording at super slow motion is limited to 0.18 seconds per buffer though, due to limitations.

The Xperia XZ2 Compact borrows the Motion Eye Camera from the Xperia XZ Premium and Xperia XZ1. It comprises a 19 MP 1/2.3” Exmor RS for mobile sensor with a 1.22 μm pixel pitch, f/2.0 aperture and 25 mm wide G Lens. It also features 4K HDR video recording, a world's first for Sony, which supports SteadyShot video stabilization alongside the standard 1080p/30 fps, a high-speed 1080p/60 fps and a 120 fps recording in 720p options. The front selfie camera has a 5-megapixel sensor (1/5") with 23 mm, f/2.2 lens, a 90-degree wide angle lens and SteadyShot with Intelligent Active Mode (5-axis stabilization).

=== Triple Image Sensing technology ===
The Xperia XZ2 Compact has the Triple Image Sensing technology that started with the Xperia XZ as standard. It is composed of the image sensing (CMOS sensor with PDAF), distance sensing (Laser AF sensor) and color sensing (RGBC-IR sensor) systems, featuring a hybrid autofocus that utilizes Phase Detection (PDAF) to lock focus on a subject within 0.03 seconds, and also includes phase and contrast detection along with predictive motion tracking. It also has a laser autofocus sensor for fast tracking and locking focus on a subject, as well as an RGBC-IR (RedGreenBlueClear-InfraRed) color sensor that assists the white balance function of the camera by providing additional data about the light conditions of the surrounding environment. It also has SteadyShot with Intelligent Auto in addition to the five-axis sensor-shift image stabilization first seen in the Xperia XZ. The Motion Eye Camera in the Xperia XZ2 Compact also has Predictive Capture. When it detects fast-paced movement, the camera automatically captures a maximum of four photos before the shutter button is pressed, and lets the user select the best one afterwards. This is done without any user intervention and is possible due to the same built-in RAM chip on the image sensor used in capturing the 960 fps super slow-motion videos.

=== 3D Creator ===
The Xperia XZ2 Compact is also capable of capturing 3D objects without the need of a dual-camera setup, a feature that was first implemented into the Xperia XZ1. It utilizes the IMX400's built-in DRAM to offload captured data before being combined and built up in the proprietary 3D Creator application, creating a near-perfect rendition of the subject, be it a face of a person, a whole head or any object the user may wish to capture. The user is then given the option to use the rendered 3D image on the included animated figures for a more creative approach or have it 3D-printed by Sony's approved 3D printing companies, all within the app itself.

== Battery ==
The Xperia XZ2 Compact is powered by a non-removable 2870 mAh battery. Charging and data transfer is handled by a USB-C port with support for USB 3.1. It also has Qualcomm's QuickCharge 3.0 and Qnovo adaptive charging technology built-in. This allows the device to monitor the cell's electrochemical processes in real time and adjust charging parameters accordingly to minimize cell damage and extend the battery unit's lifespan.

=== Battery Care ===
The Xperia XZ2 Compact also comes with Battery Care, Sony's proprietary charging algorithm that controls the charging process of the phone through machine learning. It recognizes the user's charging habits for a certain period and automatically adjusts itself to the pattern, for example an overnight charge, by stopping the initial charging to about 80-90 percent, and then continuing it until full from where it left off the next day. This effectively prevents the unnecessary damage to the battery's cells from excessive heat and current due to overcharging, further increasing the battery's life span.

== Audio and Connectivity ==
The Xperia XZ2 Compact is the first Xperia device that has no standard 3.5 mm audio jack, which has resulted in a somewhat mixed reaction from users and critics alike. To make up for the removal, the XZ2 Compact has improved wireless audio connectivity along with Sony's LDAC, an audio coding technology they developed, which is now a part of the Android Open Source Project, that enables the transmission of 24bit/96 kHz High-Resolution (Hi-Res) audio content over Bluetooth at up to 990 kbit/s, three times faster than conventional audio streaming codecs, to compatible audio devices.

Other connectivity options include Bluetooth 5 with aptX and Low Energy, NFC, 4x4 MIMO antennas for fast Wi-Fi and cellular upload/download speeds, dual-band Wi-Fi a/b/g/n/ac, Wi-Fi Direct, MirrorLink, screen casting via Miracast and Google Cast, DLNA, GPS (with A-GPS), GLONASS, BeiDou and Galileo satellite positioning. The Xperia XZ2 Compact, like most new smartphone nowadays, has no FM radio.

== Software ==
The Sony Xperia XZ2 Compact launched with the Android 8.0 Oreo operating system, along with Smart Stamina battery saving modes and Sony's proprietary multimedia apps. Android Pie started rolling out in OTA updates on October 12, 2018. An update to Android 10 was released for the Xperia XZ2 Compact on January 6, 2020.

== Successor ==
The flagship Sony Xperia XZ3, announced in August 2018, did not have a compact variant as previous flagship models have had since 2014. In May 2019 the Sony Xperia Ace (SO-02L) was introduced exclusively for Japan and the NTT Docomo carrier, which has been called the true "compact" successor of the XZ2 Compact. Unlike the XZ2 Compact, the Ace has a 3.5 mm headphone jack.

In 2019 Sony announced, that the whole hi-end "Xperia compact" series was dropped and discontinued, making XZ2c the last such product: The further "compact" phones are just the mid-class level.
