= Sony Xperia 1 =

2019 Android smartphone

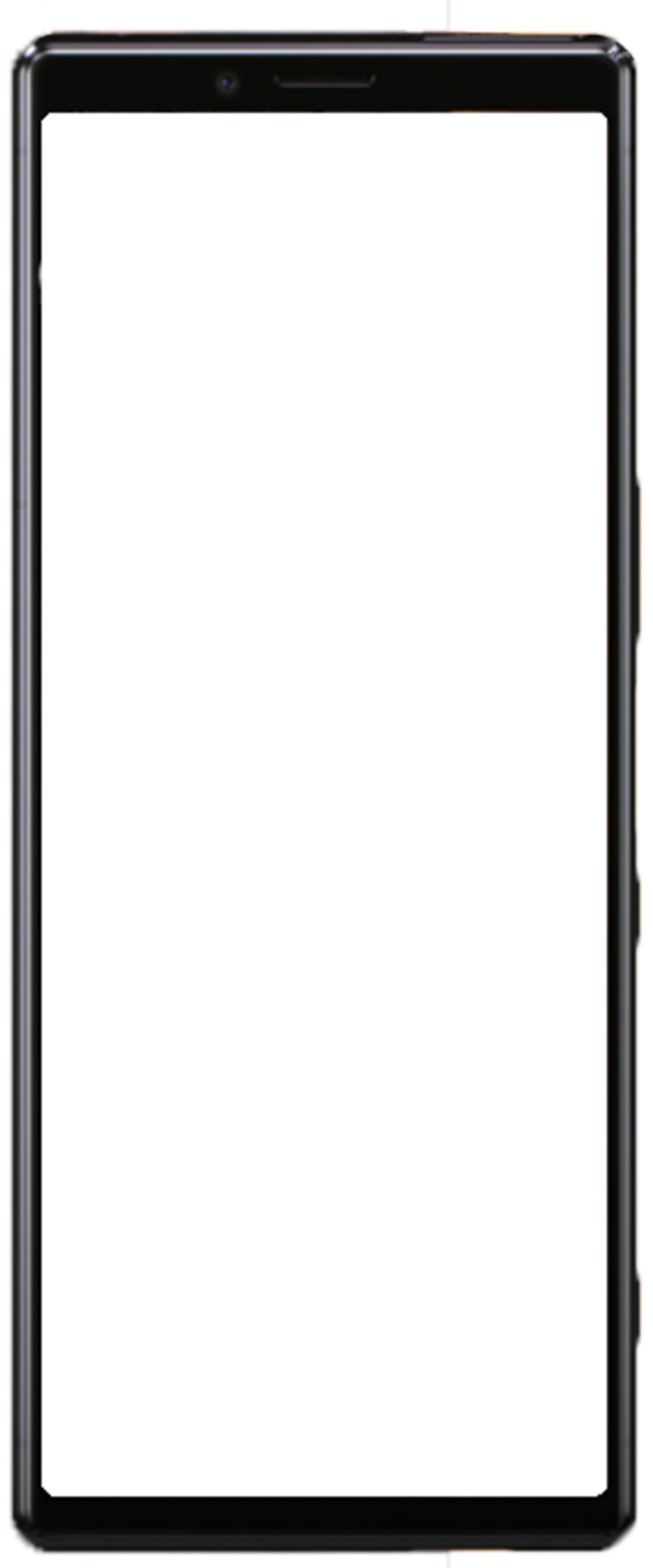
- Sony Xperia 1
- Also known as: Sony Xperia 1 Mark I
- Brand: Sony
- Developer: Sony Mobile
- Manufacturer: Sony Mobile Communications
- Type: Phablet
- Series: Sony Xperia
- Family: Sony Xperia 1 Series
- First released: 30 May 2019; 7 years ago
- Availability by region: 30 May 2019; 7 years ago (United Kingdom); 5 June 2019; 7 years ago (Germany); 6 June 2019; 7 years ago (China); 14 June 2019; 7 years ago (Japan; SO-03L, SOV40 and 802SO models); 12 July 2019; 7 years ago (United States); 24 August 2019; 7 years ago (Malaysia); 29 August 2019; 7 years ago (Singapore); 25 October 2019; 7 years ago (Japan; J9150 Xperia 1 Professional Edition model); 28 August 2020; 6 years ago (Japan; J9110 SIM-unlocked model)
- Predecessor: Sony Xperia XZ3; Sony Xperia XZ2 Premium
- Successor: Sony Xperia 1 II
- Related: Sony Xperia XZ1; Sony Xperia XZ2 Premium; Sony Xperia 5
- Compatible networks: 2G; 3G; 4G LTE; WiMAX 2+ (SOV40 model only)
- Form factor: Slate
- Colors: Black (Night Black); White (Snow White); Gray (Fog Gray); Purple (Xia Zi)
- Dimensions: 167 mm (6.6 in) H 72 mm (2.8 in) W 8.2 mm (0.32 in) D
- Weight: 178 g (6.3 oz)
- Operating system: Android 9 "Pie" upgradeable to Android 11; 2 OS updates, 2 years of security patches
- System-on-chip: Qualcomm Snapdragon 855
- CPU: Octa-core (1x 2.84 GHz Gold Prime, 3x 2.42 GHz Gold, 4x 1.8 GHz Silver) Kryo 485
- GPU: Adreno 640
- Modem: Qualcomm Snapdragon X24 LTE 4G
- Memory: 6 GB LPDDR4X RAM
- Storage: Universal Flash Storage (UFS 2.1); 64 GB (SO-03L, SOV40 and 802SO models); 128 GB (Toshiba THGAF8T0T43BAIR; J8110, J8170, J9110 and J9150 models)
- Removable storage: microSD, expandable up to 512 GB
- SIM: nanoSIM + nanoSIM
- Battery: Non-removable Li-ion 3330 mAh rated capacity: 3200 mAh
- Charging: Fast Charging USB PD 2.0 18 W Charging
- Rear camera: 12.2 MP (Sony IMX445), f/1.6, 26mm (wide), 1/2.55", 1.4 μm, predictive Dual Pixel PDAF, 5-axis OIS; 12.2 MP (Samsung ISOCELL S5K3M3), f/2.4, 52mm (telephoto), 1/3.4", 1.0 μm, predictive Dual Pixel PDAF, 2x optical zoom, 5-axis OIS; 12.2 MP (Samsung ISOCELL S5K3M3), f/2.4, 16mm (ultra-wide), 1/3.4", 1.0 μm 4K@24/25/30fps, 1080p@30/60/960fps. 720p@960fps, HDR
- Front camera: 8 MP (Samsung ISOCELL S5K4H7), f/2.0, 24mm (wide), 1/4", 1.0 μm, 1080p@30fps (5-axis gyro-EIS)
- Display: 6.5 in (170 mm) 21:9 CinemaWide™ 4K (3840 x 1644) HDR OLED, ~643 pixel density, Gorilla Glass 6, 10-bit(1.07B Colors)
- Sound: Stereo speakers (hybrid)
- Media: Game Enhancer, Music, Xperia Album
- Connectivity: Wi-Fi 802.11 a/b/g/n/ac (2.4/5 GHz); Bluetooth 5.0; USB-C; NFC; GPS with Assisted GPS; Galileo; GLONASS; BeiDou; 1seg (SO-03L, SOV40 and 802SO models only); Mobile FeliCa/Osaifu-Keitai (SO-03L, SOV40 and 802SO models only)
- Data inputs: Sensors: Accelerometer; Barometer; Fingerprint scanner (side-mounted, always on); Gyroscope; Proximity sensor; Colour spectrum sensor
- Water resistance: IP65/IP68
- Model: J8110 (EMEA); J8170 (Americas); J9110 (Dual SIM, excluding Americas); J9150 (Xperia 1 Professional Edition); J9180 (China); SO-03L (NTT Docomo); SOV40 (au/Okinawa Cellular); 802SO (SoftBank)
- Codename: Griffin (PF13)
- Development status: Released, Discontinued
- Made in: Thailand
- Other: IP65/IP68 Water/dust resistant PS4 Remote Play; DUALSHOCK®4 Control compatibility Game Enhancer; Dynamic Vibration System
- Website: Official website

The Sony Xperia 1 is an Android smartphone made by Sony. Part of Sony's flagship Xperia series, the device was announced to the public at a press conference held at the annual 2019 Mobile World Congress event on February 25, 2019. It's the world's first smartphone with an ultrawide 21:9 aspect ratio 4K HDR OLED display, dubbed Cinema Wide, and Sony's first triple-lens camera system featuring Eye AF eye-tracking technology seen in the company's Alpha line of professional-grade cameras. The Xperia 1 was later joined by a more compact device, the Xperia 5, which was revealed on 5 September 2019. Compared to the Xperia 1, the Xperia 5 has a smaller 1080p screen, a smaller battery, and a non-centrally aligned camera module.

On 25 October 2019, a upgraded version of the Sony Xperia 1 called the Sony Xperia 1 Professional Edition (J9150) was released exclusively in Japan, which is mainly sold SIM-unlocked and unlike the Japan-only carrier models, features a hybrid dual-SIM slot and has an internal storage capacity of 128 GB like the J8110, J8170 and J9110 models. The J9150 model, however, does not include support for the 1seg mobile TV, nor does it include support for the Mobile Feli Ca or the Osaifu-Keitai, unlike said carrier-only models.

== Hardware ==
=== Design and build ===
The Xperia 1 is designed around the new 21:9 aspect ratio display, a rework from the previous "Ambient Flow" design seen in the Xperia XZ3. It consists of a 7000-series aluminum alloy chassis that has a curved edge all around the device, a 2.5D scratch-resistant front and curved-edged back glass panels made of Corning Gorilla Glass 6, resulting in a more squarish but symmetrical design aesthetic, reminiscent of the classic "Omni Balance" design language of old Xperia Z-series flagships. The most defining change in the Xperia 1, as it was in the Xperia XZ2 trio and the XZ3, are the placement of the camera on the back. It is centrally aligned on the upper half of the device, as opposed to being placed on the top-left side like in previous Xperia devices. The NFC antenna is placed on the left-handed side of the new triple-lens camera system, housed in a raised module with chrome beveled edges surrounding it, along with the color sensing (RGBC-IR sensor) and the single LED flash up top.

The front houses the 6.5 in (170 mm) ultra-wide 4K HDR OLED display with slight curve corners and very minimal bezels on both sides, and significantly slim (when compared to the XZ3) but at the metrical top and bottom bezels. On the top bezel is the earpiece that acts as part of the hybrid dual-stereo speaker setup, the 8 MP front-facing camera, ambient light and proximity sensor and a notification LED. The hybrid SIM tray is located on the top of the device, with a sealed pull-out type of cover for added ingress protection. The bottom bezel has shrunk significantly and is blank, omitting the company logo entirely. The second part of the stereo speaker is relegated to the bottom along with the lone USB Type-C port and primary microphone.

The fingerprint sensor is now re-positioned back to the right-hand side of the device as with previous XZ Series devices. This is possible, in part because the power button is now separate. To mitigate this, scanner is now always-on. Directly above the fingerprint scanner is the volume rocker, and below the power button near the bottom edge is the camera shutter button, this has become a staple of Xperia devices ever since.

The Xperia 1's dimensions are 167 mm (6.6 in) in height, with a width of 72 mm (2.8 in) and a depth of 8.2 mm (0.32 in) and weighs approximately 178 g (6.3 oz). It is rated IP65/IP68 dust/waterproof up to 1.5 m for 30 minutes. The device comes in 4 colors: Black, White, Gray and in some markets, Purple.

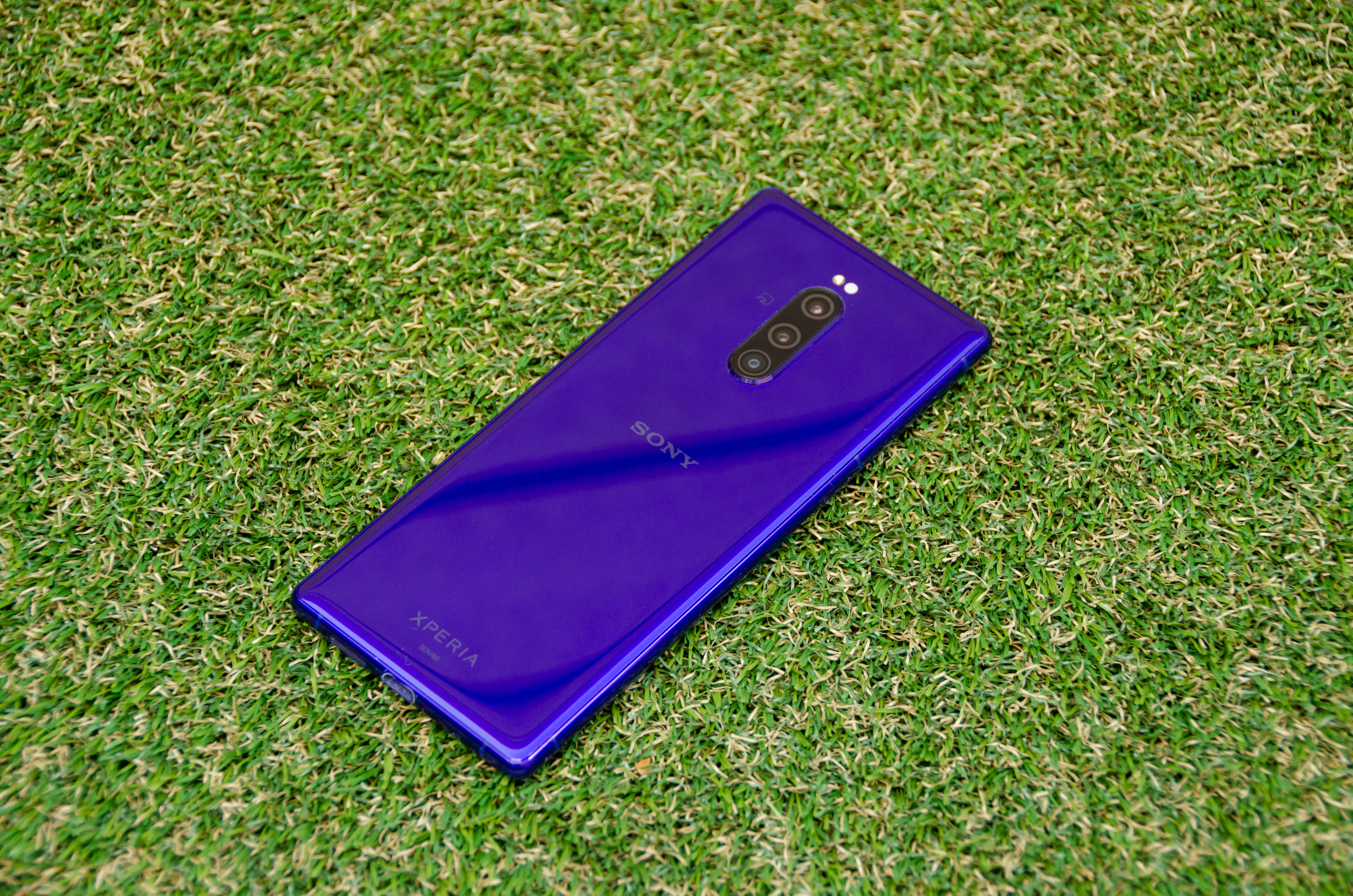
Backside

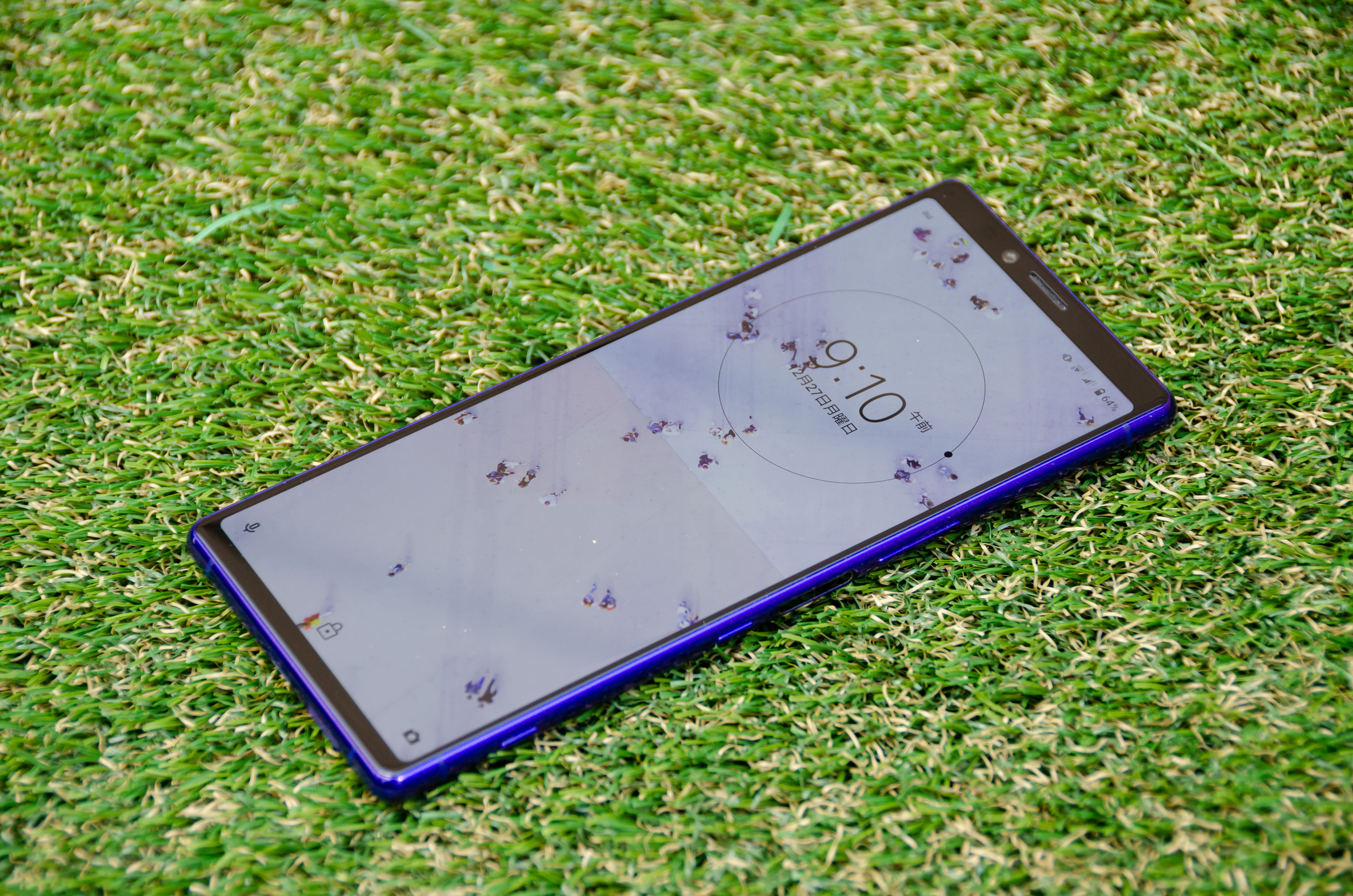
Frontside

=== Performance ===
The Xperia 1 is powered by the Qualcomm Snapdragon 855 chipset, built on a 7 nm process technology with 8 Kryo 485 processors in a 1 + 3 + 4 configuration (1x 2.84 GHz Gold Prime, 3x 2.42 GHz Gold, and 4x 1.8 GHz Silver), 6 GB of LPDDR4X RAM and an Adreno 640 for graphics rendering. It has the option a 64 GB (SO-03L, SOV4,0, and 802SO models) or 128 GB (J8110, J8170, J9110 and J9150 models) UFS 2.1 internal storage and comes in a single-SIM or hybrid dual-SIM versions depending on region, with both featuring 5CA LTE Cat.19 of up to 1.6 Gbit/s download speeds. It also has microSD card expansion of up to 512 GB in a hybrid SIM 2 slot setup.

=== Display ===
The Xperia 1 showcases the world's first 6.5 in (170 mm) 21:9 aspect ratio 4K HDR OLED display officially called Cinema Wide, with a 3840 × 1644 resolution, and 643 ppi pixel density. This aspect ratio was previously found in LG New Chocolate (BL40). In a more practical approach, the display resolution on regular usage and throughout the UI only is at PPI ppi, which is still considered sharp and is especially beneficial for the battery. The full 4K resolution only triggers automatically when compatible content is displayed on-screen.

The Xperia 1 also has a new system-wide color setting feature, called "Creator mode", alongside the "Standard" and "Super-vivid" modes. When activated, the Xperia 1 tries its best to display accurate colors as close as possible to the original intention of the content creator. It has a BT-2022 certification HDR, which is more versatile than HDR10. This supports the wide color space ITU-R BT.2020m and as DCI P3 and Illuminant D65. It does however require the source to be encoded with the proper color info to take advantage of the feature. The device also has the new X1 for mobile engine borrowed from their BRAVIA TV line, optimizing content that is not natively-created for the high contrast and color palette of the OLED panel.

== Camera ==
The Xperia 1 further improves and upgrades the previous Motion Eye camera from the XZ3 with a Sony-first Triple lens camera system. It is composed of the primary 12.2 MP 1/2.55" Exmor RS for mobile memory-stacked Dual Photo Diode (2PD) sensor with a 1.4 μm behind an f/1.6 aperture, 26 mm "regular wide" lens; a second 12 MP 1/3.4" RGB sensor with a 1.0 μm behind an f/2.4 aperture, 52 mm lens and 2x optical zoom for "telephoto"; and a third 12 MP 1/3.4" RGB sensor with a 1.0 μm sitting behind an f/2.4 aperture, 16 mm 130° "ultra-wide-angle" lens. They are paired with the RGBC-IR color spectrum sensor that assists the white balance of the camera by providing additional light data from the surrounding conditions of the scene, and a single LED flash. The front selfie camera has a 1/4" 8-megapixel sensor with an f/2.0 lens and Steady Shot with Intelligent Active Mode (5-axis stabilization).

The Xperia 1 is capable of capturing 4K HDR video, and the two sensors (primary and telephoto) are optically stabilized, a first for an Xperia device, dubbed Optical Steady Shot. It has an Intelligent Active Mode where it which alongside the standard electronic Steady Shot (5-axis EIS + OIS) for better video stabilization. Exclusive for the Xperia 1 is the BIONZ X for mobile image-processing engine, borrowed from Sony's Alpha professional cameras. This brings pro camera Alpha technologies to the Xperia line for a more professional approach to mobile photography.

For the Xperia 1 is the new fast Eye AF. It is an focusing system that focuses and locks into a subject's eye for subject tracking. It can calculate and measure the distance of the subject it is currently tracking from the device, and, through machine learning, can also remember the particular person's eye if he/she was either blocked by view or moved out of the frame for a while and then back in.

An additional camera feature is Cinema Pro, which is a video capture application designed in collaboration with Sony's CineAlta division and squarely aimed at cinematography enthusiasts. Other unique camera features of the Xperia 1 include an Autofocus burst with up to 10 fps of AF/AE tracking, Predictive Hybrid Autofocus, an Anti-distortion shutter and RAW image file recording with RAW noise reduction.

The Xperia 1 also has Predictive Capture. When it detects fast-paced movement, the camera automatically captures a maximum of four photos before the shutter button is pressed, and lets the user select the best one afterwards. This is done without any user intervention and is possible due to the same built-in DRAM chip on the image sensor used in capturing the 960 fps super slow-motion videos. Xperia 1 marks the last device from Xperia devices to have Sony's 960fps fps super slow-motion videos as Xperia 5 and Xperia 1 II no longer support the feature due to different hardwares.

== Battery ==
The Xperia 1 is powered by a non-removable 3,330 mAh lithium-ion battery. Charging and data transfer is handled by a USB-C 3.1 port with support for USB Power Delivery. It also has Qnovo adaptive charging technology built-in which allows the device to monitor the cell's electrochemical processes in real time and adjust charging parameters accordingly to minimize cell damage and extend the battery unit's lifespan.

=== Battery Care ===
The Xperia 1 also comes with Battery Care, Sony's proprietary charging algorithm that controls the charging process of the phone through machine learning. It recognizes the user's charging habits for a certain period and automatically adjusts itself to the pattern, for example an overnight charge, by stopping the initial charging to about 80–90 percent, and then continuing it until full from where it left off the next day. This effectively prevents the unnecessary damage to the battery's cells from excessive heat and current due to overcharging, further increasing the battery's life span.

== Audio and connectivity ==
The Xperia 1, like the Xperia XZ2 that preceded it, has the standard 3.5 mm audio jack omitted in favor of wireless. To make up for the removal, it has improved wireless audio connectivity along with LDAC, an audio coding technology developed in-house by Sony which is now a part of the Android Open Source Project, that enables the transmission of 24-bit/96 kHz High-Resolution (Hi-Res) audio content over Bluetooth at up to 990 kbit/s, three times faster than conventional audio streaming codecs, to compatible audio devices. It also comes with Dolby Atmos for a better sound reproduction.

Other connectivity options include Bluetooth 5 with aptX HD and Low Energy, NFC, 4x4 MIMO antennas for fast Wi-Fi and cellular upload/download speeds, dual-band Wi-Fi a/b/g/n/ac, Wi-Fi Direct, DLNA, GPS (with A-GPS), GLONASS, BeiDou and Galileo satellite positioning. The Xperia 1, like most high-end smartphone nowadays, has no FM radio.

== Software ==
The Sony Xperia 1 is launched with the Android 9 "Pie" operating system, along with Smart Stamina battery saving modes and Sony's proprietary multimedia apps. It features an improved Side Sense. It works through a pair of touch-sensitive areas on either side of the phone. A tap or slide triggers various actions set by the user, most of which configurable including the sensitivity of the touch areas. Another feature by the Side Sense is Pair shortcut which, upon launch from the Side Sense window, will trigger a split-screen setup with the selected pair of user-customizable apps instantly. In December 2019, Sony began to release Android 10 for the Xperia 1.

== Japanese models ==
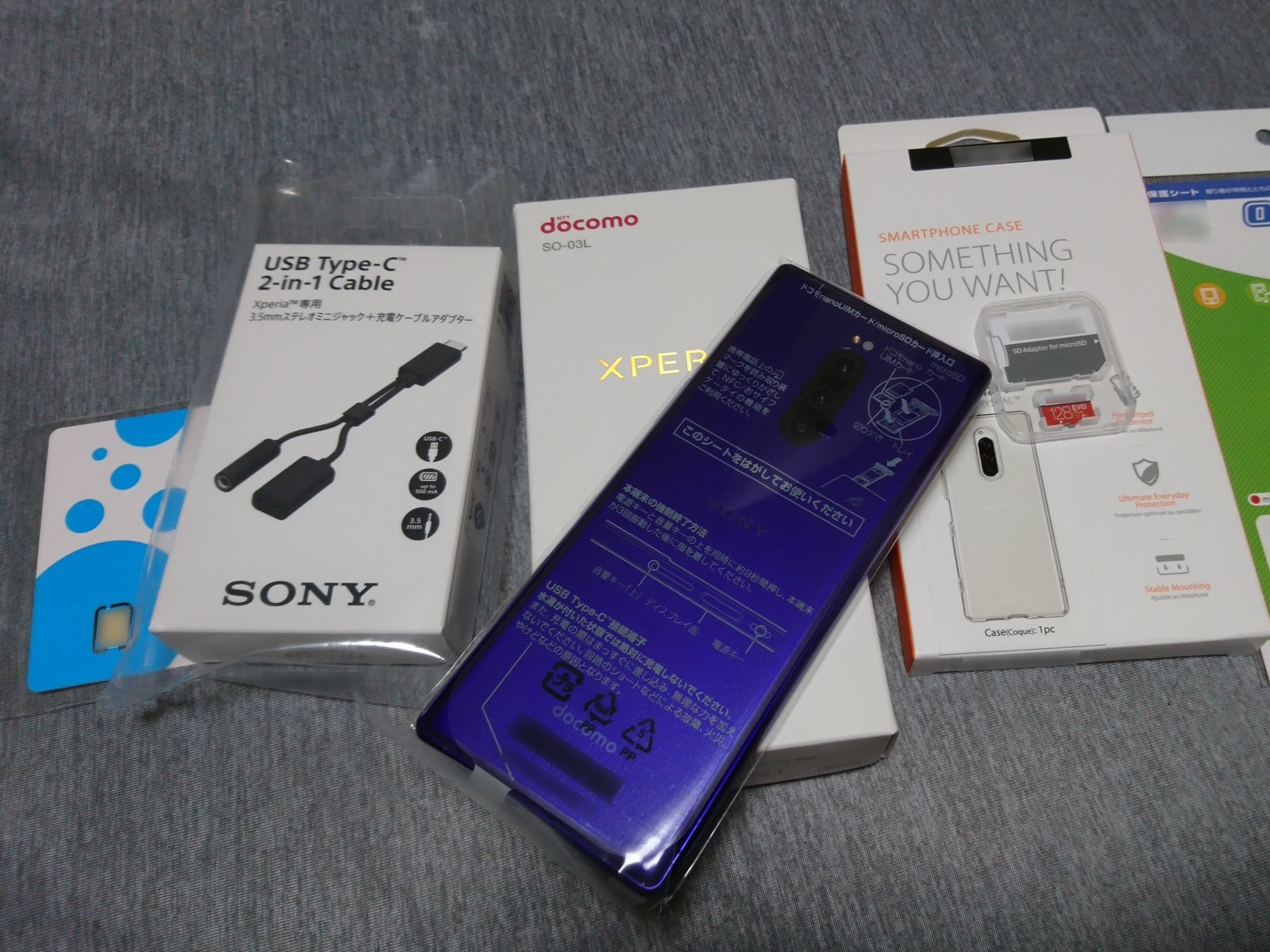
The back of a newly purchased Sony Xperia 1 (SO-03L model), showing the triple lens camera

=== SO-03L ===
NTT Docomo unveiled the SO-03L on May 16, 2019 and released on June 14. Additionally, the system memory capacity was expanded to 6GB, up from the 4GB found on the Xperia XZ3 SO-01L. The device is available in Purple and Black color variations, though the White and Gray options released for the global market are omitted from this lineup.

Supported Main Services
Touchscreen / Accelerometer	PREMIUM 4G / Xi / FOMA High Speed / VoLTE (Supports HD+)	Bluetooth	d Card / Osaifu-Keitai / NFC / Kazashite Link / ~~Infrared (IrDA)~~ / ToruCa
1seg / Fullseg	Melody Call	Tethering	Wi-Fi IEEE802.11a/b/g/n/ac
GPS	Docomo Mail / Phonebook Backup	Deco-mail / Deco-mail Emoji / ~~Deco-mail Anime~~	i-channel
Area Mail / Automatic Software Update / Biometrics (Fingerprint / ~~Iris~~) / Sugu-Den	Digital audio player (WMA, MP3, etc.) / High-resolution audio	GSM / 3G Roaming (WORLD WING)	Full browser / ~~Flash Player~~
Google Play / dmenu / d market	Gmail / Google Talk / YouTube / Picasa	Barcode reader / Business card reader	Docomo Map Navi / Docomo Drive Net / Google Maps / Street View

=== SOV40 ===
The SOV40 was unveiled on May 13, 2019 by KDDI and Okinawa Cellular and released on June 14. It comes with White, Purple, and Black colorways. The time duration of One-Seg is approximately 9 hours.

The device features Side Sense, an AI-driven function that predicts and suggests the user's next application, alongside support for Dolby Atmos, Hi-Res Audio, 1Seg/Fullseg TV broadcasting, and IP-rated dust and water resistance.

Main Features & Supported Services
au Widget; Web Browser	Uta Pass Music Player (Hi-Res Audio compatible)	Osaifu-Keitai; NFC; ~~Wireless Charging (Qi)~~; Fingerprint Authentication	One Seg; Full Seg; DLNA/DTCP-IP
au one Mail; PC Mail; Gmail; EZweb Mail	Decoration Mail; ~~Decoration Anime~~	Friends Note	PC Document
au Smart Sports; Run & Walk; Karada Manager; Golf (web version); Fitness, Pedometer	GPS; Compass	au one Navi Walk au one Drive Navi	au one News EX au one GREE
au Basic Home; Jibun Bank	Emergency Alert Mail (au)	Bluetooth	Wireless LAN Functionality (Wi-Fi) au Share Link
Infrared Communication (Not supported)	au VoLTE (Sync Call supported); ~~WIN HIGH SPEED~~ au 4G LTE (3CC CA supported); WiMAX2+	au World Service (Formerly Global Passport)	au Femtocell
microSD microSDHC microSDXC	Motion Sensor (6-axis)	Waterproof; Dustproof	Simple Answering Machine; Call Blocking Settings
