= Sony Xperia XZ1 Compact =

Android smartphone

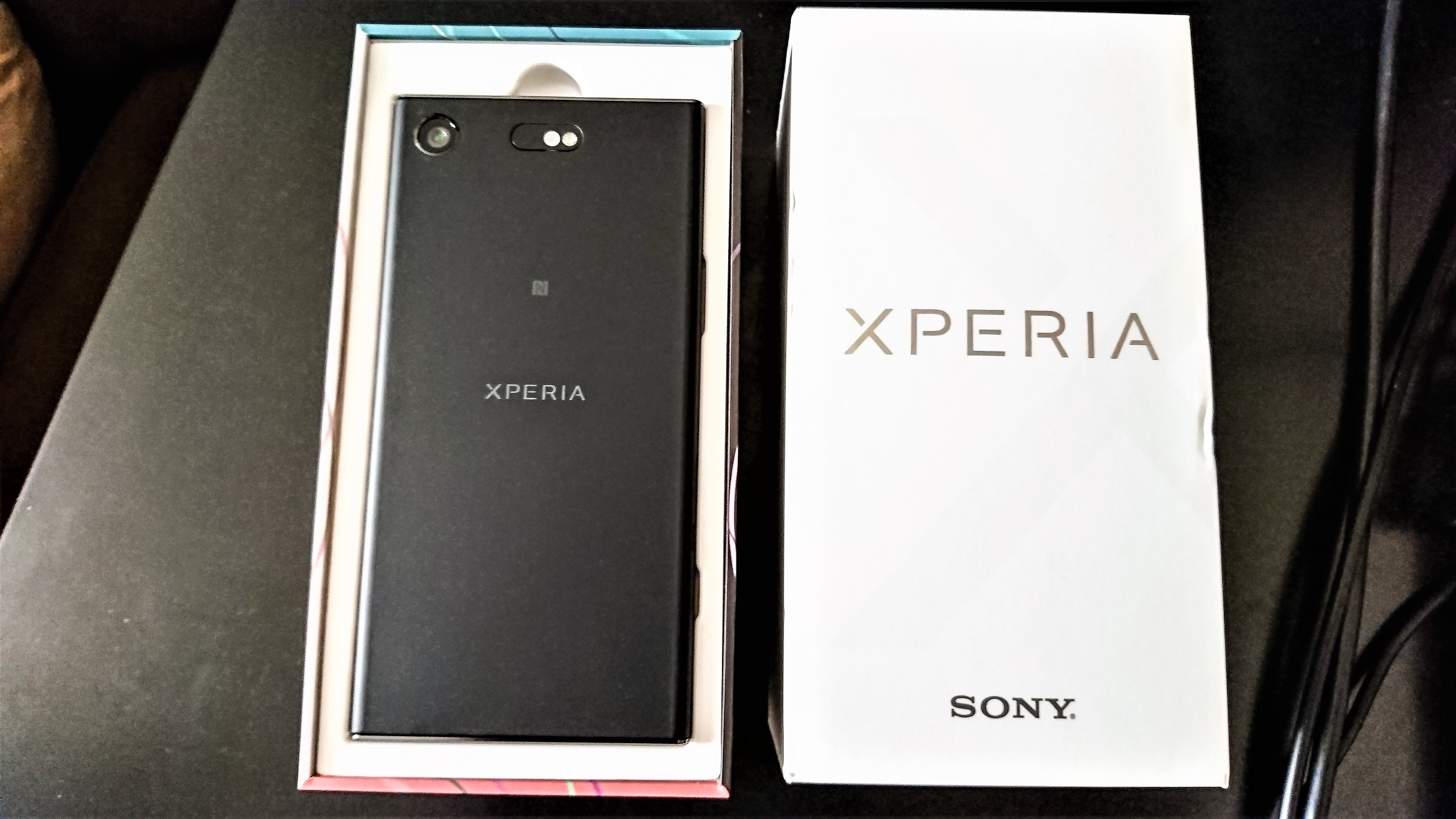
- Brand: Sony
- Manufacturer: Sony Mobile Communications
- Type: Touchscreen smartphone
- Series: Sony Xperia
- First released: 31 August 2017; 8 years ago
- Predecessor: Sony Xperia X Compact
- Successor: Sony Xperia XZ2 Compact
- Related: Sony Xperia XZ1
- Compatible networks: HSPA, GSM & LTE
- Form factor: Slate
- Dimensions: 129 mm (5.1 in) H 65 mm (2.6 in) W 9.3 mm (0.37 in) D
- Weight: 143 g (5.0 oz)
- Operating system: Android 8.0 "Oreo" (Upgradable to Android 9 "Pie")
- System-on-chip: Qualcomm Snapdragon 835 MSM8998
- CPU: Octa-core 64-bit (4x2.45 GHz Kryo & 4x1.9 GHz Kryo)
- GPU: Adreno 540
- Memory: 4 GB
- Storage: 32 GB
- Removable storage: Up to 256GB microSDXC
- Battery: non-user removable Li-ion 2700 mAh
- Rear camera: 19 MP Motion Eye Camera, 1/2.3'' memory-stacked Exmor RS image sensor
- Front camera: 8 MP 1/4'' Exmor R for mobile sensor
- Display: 4.6 in (120 mm) 720p IPS LCD
- Connectivity: Wi-Fi; DLNA; GPS/GLONASS/BeiDou/Galileo; Bluetooth 5 USB (Type-C port, USB charging, Quick Charge 3.0); NFC
- Data inputs: Multi-touch, capacitive touchscreen, proximity sensor, fingerprint scanner (side-mounted)
- Model: G8441 PM-1061-BV; SO-02K PM-1060-BV (Docomo)
- Codename: Lilac (PF31)
- Website: Official website

The Sony Xperia XZ1 Compact is a compact flagship Android smartphone manufactured and marketed by Sony. The phone was announced to the public along with the Sony Xperia XZ1 at a press conference which was held at IFA 2017 on August 31, 2017. It is the successor to the Sony Xperia X Compact and the first flagship-grade compact smartphone from Sony since the Sony Xperia Z5 Compact. It is known as the SO-02K in Japan, where it is exclusive to the NTT Docomo carrier.

== Specifications ==
=== Hardware ===
The Sony Xperia XZ1 Compact contains largely the same specifications as the Sony Xperia XZ1 but with a smaller 4.6" 720p screen. It features a Snapdragon 835 chipset, IP65/68 waterproofing and S-Force Front Surround stereo speakers. It also features the same 19MP, 1/2.3" Sony IMX400 camera found in the Sony Xperia XZ Premium, Sony Xperia XZs and Sony Xperia XZ1 that is capable of recording slow-motion video at 960 fps.

Unlike the XZ1, the XZ1 Compact's body is made of glass fiber woven plastic. It came in four colors: Black, White Silver, Horizon Blue and Twilight Pink.

=== Software ===
The Sony Xperia XZ1 Compact (along with the larger XZ1) was the first Android smartphone to launch with Android 8.0 Oreo already installed. Updating to Android 9 was made available via OTA in January 2019. As with the larger XZ1, it introduced a 3D scanning feature developed by Sony.

== Reception ==
The Sony Xperia XZ1 Compact received mostly positive reception. Reviewers liked a return of a top-end processor and waterproof body compared to the Sony Xperia X Compact, as well as its display and battery life. However one criticism (along with the full size XZ1) was its outdated design and thick bezels, which TechnoBuffalo called "awkwardly stand out in 2017 as they would in 2012", and its high price was also criticized. Its main competitor was the first-generation iPhone SE, the only other small sized smartphone at the time.

It was succeeded by the Sony Xperia XZ2 Compact, which featured a new smooth curved design and a larger 5.0 inch display.
