= Xperia XZ2 =

Android smartphone manufactured and marketed by Sony

Sony Xperia XZ2
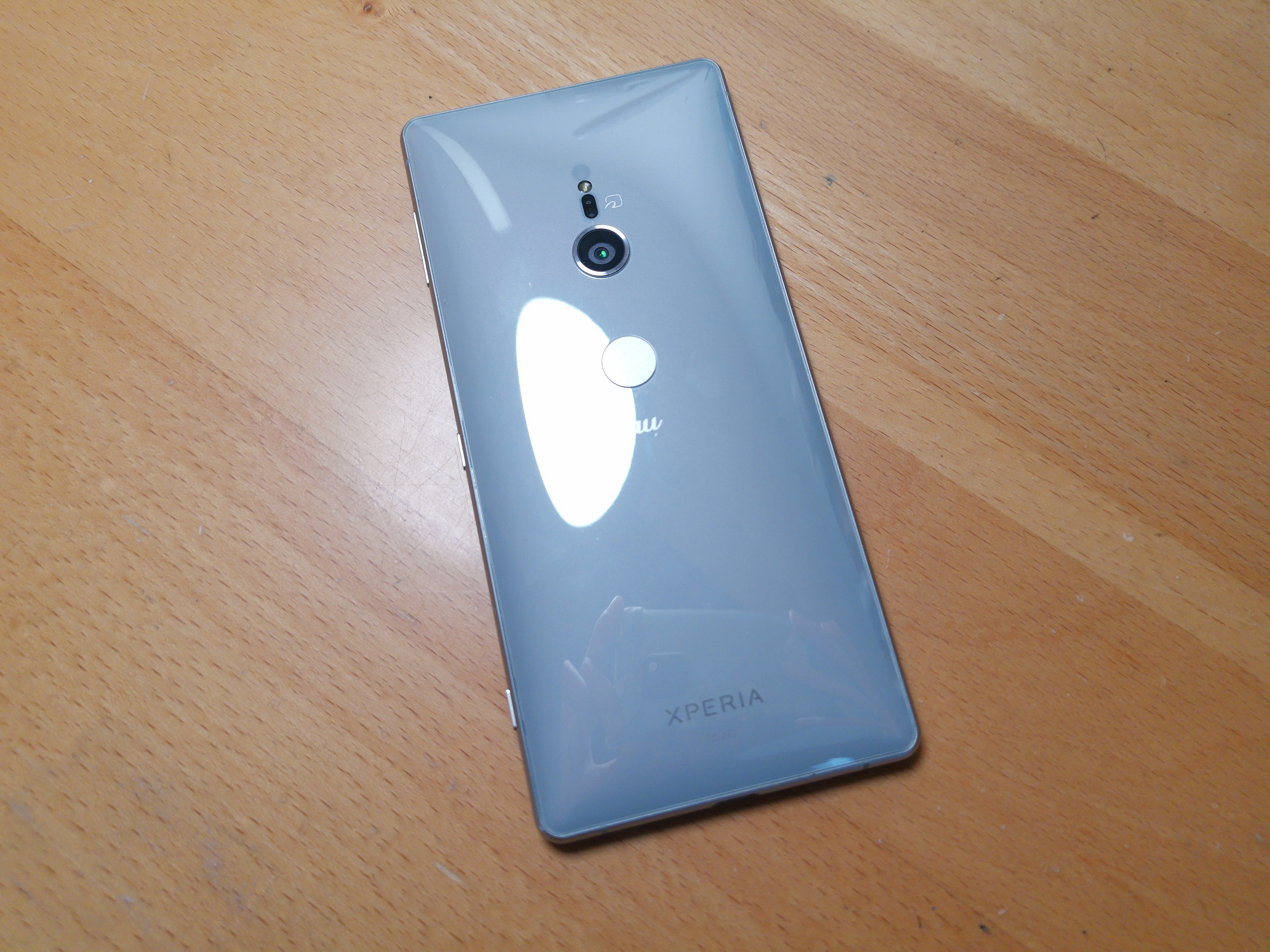
- The back of the Xperia XZ2
- Brand: Sony
- Manufacturer: Sony Mobile Communications
- Type: Smartphone
- Series: Sony Xperia
- First released: 5 April 2018; 8 years ago
- Predecessor: Sony Xperia XZ1
- Successor: Sony Xperia XZ3
- Related: Sony Xperia XZ2 Compact; Sony Xperia XZ2 Premium
- Compatible networks: 2G; 3G; 4G; 4G LTE
- Form factor: Slate
- Dimensions: 153 mm (6.0 in) H 72 mm (2.8 in) W 11.1 mm (0.44 in) D
- Weight: 198 g (7.0 oz)
- Operating system: Android 8.0 "Oreo"(Upgradable to Android 10)
- System-on-chip: Qualcomm Snapdragon 845
- CPU: Octa-core (4x2.7 GHz Kryo 385 Gold & 4x1.7 GHz Kryo 385 Silver)
- GPU: Adreno 630
- Memory: 4 GB / 6 GB (Taiwan and Hong Kong) LPDDR4X RAM
- Storage: 64 GB
- Removable storage: microSD, expandable up to 400 GB
- Battery: Non-removable 3180 mAh
- Rear camera: 19 MP (f/2.0, 25mm, 1/2.3", 1.22 μm), gyro EIS, predictive phase detection and laser AF, LED flash, 4K at 30fps, 1080p at 30, 60fps or 960fps slo-mo
- Front camera: 5 MP (f/2.2, 1/5"), gyro EIS, 1080p
- Display: 5.7 in (140 mm) 1080p (2160 × 1080) IPS LCD, ~424 pixel density, Gorilla Glass 5
- Sound: Stereo speakers
- Connectivity: Wi-Fi 802.11 a/b/g/n/ac (2.4/5 GHz) Bluetooth 5.0, USB-C, NFC, location (GPS, Galileo, GLONASS, BeiDou)
- Data inputs: Sensors: Accelerometer; Barometer; Fingerprint scanner (rear-mounted); Gyroscope; Proximity sensor
- Model: H8216, H8296
- Codename: Akari (PF22)
- Website: Official Website

The Sony Xperia XZ2 is an Android-based smartphone unveiled, manufactured, released and marketed by Sony. Part of the Xperia X series, the device was announced to the public along with the Xperia XZ2 Compact at a press conference held at the annual 2018 Mobile World Congress event on February 26, 2018. It features Qi wireless charging, Dynamic Vibration System, 4K HDR video recording and has the standard 3.5 mm headphone jack removed.

== Hardware ==
=== Design and Build ===
The Xperia XZ2 comes with the new "Ambient Flow" design. It consists of a new 7000-series aluminum alloy chassis that has a curved edge all around the device, and 2.5D scratch-resistant front and arched back glass panels made of Corning's Gorilla Glass 5, resulting in a symmetric and curvier design aesthetic. The most defining change in the Xperia XZ2, as well as the Xperia XZ2 Premium and XZ2 Compact, is the placement of the camera on the back. It is now symmetrically arranged on the top-center of the device, as opposed to being placed on the top left side like on previous Xperia smartphones. The NFC antenna is placed along the Triple Image Sensing System, the MotionEye camera module and the now US-enabled fingerprint sensor, symmetrically aligned near the top-center axis of the device. The front houses the improved dual front-firing stereo speakers, one on the top bezel along with a 5 MP front camera, ambient light and proximity sensor and notification LED, and the other on the bottom bezel in an elongated slit along the edge of the glass and frame.

The Xperia XZ2's dimensions are 153 mm (6.0 in) in height, with a width of 72 mm (2.8 in) and a depth of 11.1 mm (0.44 in) and weighs approximately 198 g (7.0 oz). The device comes in 4 colors: Liquid Black, Liquid Silver, Deep Green and Ash Pink.

=== Display and Performance ===
The Xperia XZ2 is powered by the Qualcomm Snapdragon 845, built on a 10 nm process technology with 8 custom Kryo 385 processors (4x 2.7 GHz and 4x 1.7 GHz), 4/6 GB of LPDDR4X RAM and uses the Adreno 630 for graphics rendering. The device also has an internal storage of 64 GB and comes in single-SIM and dual-SIM versions, with both featuring LTE Cat. 16 with 3x carrier aggregation, a 4x4 MIMO antenna design with a total of 8 antennas. It also has microSD card expansion of up to 400 GB in a hybrid SIM 2 slot setup.

== Camera ==
=== MotionEye ===
Sony debuted in the Xperia XZs and the XZ Premium the world's first three-layer stacked image sensor with DRAM for smartphones. Known as the Sony IMX400, the sensor features a RAM chip sandwiched in between the sensor and control circuitry layers which serves as a large and fast buffer to where the sensor can temporarily offload a significant amount of captured data before transferring it to the phone's internal memory for processing. This enables the camera to record super slow-motion videos at 960 fps, at a steady 720p resolution. Recording at super slow motion is limited to 0.18 seconds per buffer though, due to limitations.

The Xperia XZ2 borrows the Motion Eye Camera from the Xperia XZ Premium and Xperia XZ1. It comprises a 19 MP 1/2.3” Exmor RS for mobile sensor with a 1.22 μm pixel pitch, f/2.0 aperture and 25 mm wide G Lens. It also features 4K HDR video recording, a world's first for Sony, which supports SteadyShot video stabilization alongside the standard 1080p/30 fps, a high-speed 1080p/60 fps and a 120 fps recording in 720p options. The front selfie camera has a 5-megapixel sensor (1/5") with 23 mm, f/2.2 lens, a 90-degree wide angle lens and SteadyShot with Intelligent Active Mode (5-axis stabilization).

=== Triple Image Sensing technology ===
The Xperia XZ2 has the Triple Image Sensing technology that started with the Xperia XZ as standard. It is composed of the image sensing (CMOS sensor with PDAF), distance sensing (Laser AF sensor) and color sensing (RGBC-IR sensor) systems, featuring a hybrid autofocus that utilizes Phase Detection (PDAF) to lock focus on a subject within 0.03 seconds, and also includes phase and contrast detection along with predictive motion tracking. It also has a laser autofocus sensor for fast tracking and locking focus on a subject, as well as an RGBC-IR (RedGreenBlueClear-InfraRed) color sensor that assists the white balance function of the camera by providing additional data about the light conditions of the surrounding environment. It also has SteadyShot with Intelligent Auto in addition to the five-axis sensor-shift image stabilization first seen in the Xperia XZ. The Motion Eye Camera in the Xperia XZ2 also has Predictive Capture. When it detects fast-paced movement, the camera automatically captures a maximum of four photos before the shutter button is pressed, and lets the user select the best one afterwards. This is done without any user intervention and is possible due to the same built-in RAM chip on the image sensor used in capturing the 960 fps super slow-motion videos.

=== 3D Creator ===
The Xperia XZ2 is also capable of capturing 3D objects without the need of a dual-camera setup, a feature that was first implemented into the Xperia XZ1. It utilizes the IMX400's built-in DRAM to offload captured data before being combined and built up in the proprietary 3D Creator application, creating a near-perfect rendition of the subject, be it a face of a person, a whole head or any object the user may wish to capture. The user is then given the option to use the rendered 3D image on the included animated figures for a more creative approach or have it 3D-printed by Sony's approved 3D printing companies, all within the app itself.

== Battery ==
The Xperia XZ2 is powered by a non-removable 3180 mAh battery. Charging and data transfer is handled by a USB-C port with support for USB 3.1 and Qi Wireless Charging. It also has Qualcomm's QuickCharge 3.0 and Qnovo adaptive charging technology built-in. This allows the device to monitor the cell's electrochemical processes in real time and adjust charging parameters accordingly to minimize cell damage and extend the battery unit's lifespan.

=== Battery Care ===
The Xperia XZ2 also comes with Battery Care, Sony's proprietary charging algorithm that controls the charging process of the phone through machine learning. It recognizes the user's charging habits for a certain period and automatically adjusts itself to the pattern, for example an overnight charge, by stopping the initial charging to about 80-90 percent, and then continuing it until full from where it left off the next day. This effectively prevents the unnecessary damage to the battery's cells from excessive heat and current due to overcharging, further increasing the battery's life span.

== Audio and Connectivity ==
The Xperia XZ2 is the first Xperia device that has no standard 3.5 mm audio jack, which has resulted in a somehow mixed reaction from users and critics alike. To make up for the removal, the XZ2 has improved wireless audio connectivity along with Sony's famed LDAC, an audio coding technology they've developed in-house, which is now a part of the Android Open Source Project, that enables the transmission of 24bit/96 kHz High-Resolution (Hi-Res) audio content over Bluetooth at up to 990 kbit/s, three times faster than conventional audio streaming codecs, to compatible audio devices.

Other connectivity options include Bluetooth 5 with aptX and Low Energy, NFC, 4x4 MIMO antennas for fast WI-Fi and cellular upload/download speeds, dual-band Wi-Fi a/b/g/n/ac, Wi-Fi Direct, MirrorLink, screen casting via Miracast and Google Cast, DLNA, GPS (with A-GPS), GLONASS, BeiDou and Galileo satellite positioning. The Xperia XZ2, like most new smartphone nowadays, has no FM radio.

== Software ==
The Sony Xperia XZ2 was launched with the Android 8.0 Oreo operating system, along with Smart Stamina battery saving modes and Sony's proprietary multimedia apps. On October 12, 2018, the latest Android 9 Pie started rolling out in OTA updates along with monthly security updates to users worldwide. Later, the device's official support was extended to Android 10.

== Variants ==
Sony Xperia XZ2 H8266

• GSM GPRS/EDGE: 850, 900, 1800, 1900 MHz

• UMTS HSPA+: 800 (Band VI), 800 (Band XIX), 850 (Band V), 900 (Band VIII), 1700 (Band IV), 1900 (Band II), 2100 (Band I) MHz

• LTE Bands: 1, 2, 3, 4, 5, 7, 8, 12, 13, 17, 19, 20, 26, 28, 29, 32, 38, 39, 40, 41, 66.

Sony Xperia XZ2 H8296

• GSM GPRS/EDGE: 850, 900, 1800, 1900 MHz

• UMTS HSPA+: 800 (Band VI), 800 (Band XIX), 850 (Band V), 900 (Band VIII), 1700 (Band IV), 1900 (Band II), 2100 (Band I) MHz

• LTE Bands: 1, 2, 3, 4, 5, 7, 8, 12, 13, 17, 19, 20, 26, 28, 29, 32, 38, 39, 40, 41, 66.

(The above information was provided by Sony Xperia Support Australia via email)
