= Sony Xperia X Compact =

Android smartphone developed by Sony

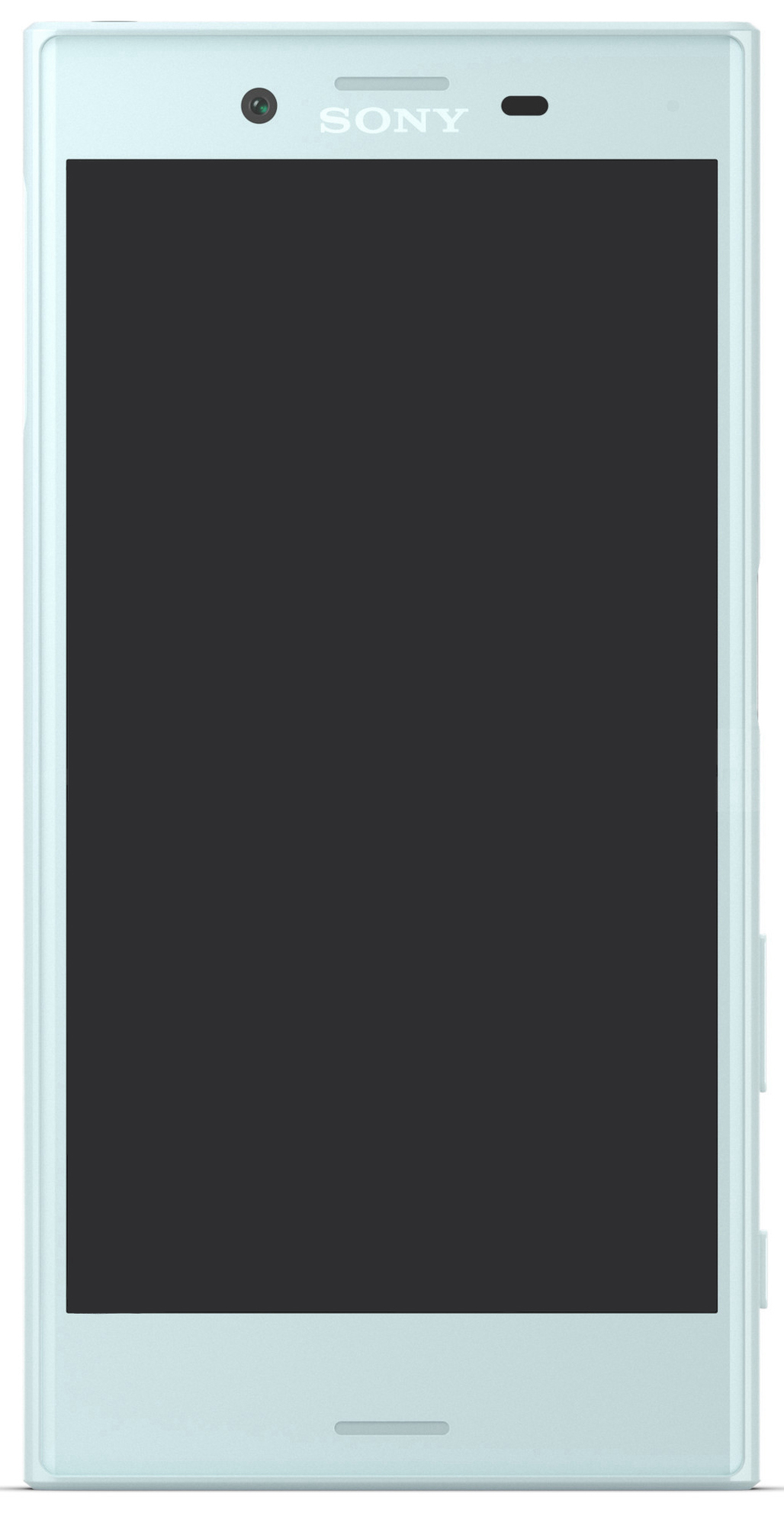
- Mist Blue color
- Brand: Sony
- Manufacturer: Sony Mobile Communications
- Type: Touchscreen smartphone
- Series: Sony Xperia
- Family: Sony Xperia X Series
- First released: 8 September 2016; 10 years ago
- Availability by region: 8 September 2016; 10 years ago (United Kingdom); 10 September 2016; 10 years ago (Netherlands, Belgium and Luxembourg); 25 September 2016; 10 years ago (United States); 29 September 2016; 10 years ago (Thailand); 7 October 2016; 10 years ago (Hong Kong)
- Predecessor: Sony Xperia Z5 Compact
- Successor: Sony Xperia XZ1 Compact
- Related: Sony Xperia X Sony Xperia XZ
- Compatible networks: HSPA, GSM & LTE
- Form factor: Slate
- Dimensions: 129 mm (5.1 in) H 65 mm (2.6 in) W 9.5 mm (0.37 in) D
- Weight: 135 g (4.8 oz)
- Operating system: Original: Android 6.0.1 Marshmallow; Current: Android 8.0 Oreo
- System-on-chip: Qualcomm Snapdragon 650 MSM8956
- CPU: Hexa-core 64-bit (2 × 1.8 GHz + 4 × 1.4 GHz)
- GPU: Adreno 510
- Memory: 3 GB
- Storage: 32 GB
- Removable storage: Up to 256GB microSDXC
- Battery: Non-user removable Li-ion 2700 mAh
- Display: 4.6 in (120 mm) 720p IPS LCD
- Connectivity: Wi-Fi; NFC; DLNA; GPS/GLONASS/BeiDou; Bluetooth 4.2; USB 2.0 (Type-C port, USB charging, Quick Charge 3.0)
- Data inputs: Multi-touch, capacitive touchscreen, proximity sensor
- Model: F5321
- Codename: Kugo
- Website: Official Website

The Sony Xperia X Compact is an Android smartphone manufactured and marketed by Sony. Part of the Xperia X series, the phone was announced to the public along with the Xperia XZ at a press conferences which was held at IFA 2016 on September 1, 2016. In Japan, the phones model number is SO-02J, which is exclusive to NTT Docomo, and is available in a water and dust resistant variant unlike the global version.

== Specifications ==
=== Hardware ===
The Sony Xperia X Compact has a 4.6-inch LTPS IPS LCD, Hexa-core (4x1.4 GHz Cortex-A53 & 2x1.8 GHz Cortex-A72) Qualcomm Snapdragon 650 processor, 3 GB of RAM and 32 GB of internal storage that can be expanded using microSD cards up to 256 GB. The phone has a 2700 mAh Li-ion battery, 23 MP rear camera with LED flash and 5 MP front-facing camera with auto-focus. It is available in White, Universe black, Mist blue colors. Xperia X Compact, alongside the bigger Xperia X, were the last Xperia midrange devices to have front-firing stereo speakers until its reintroduction in the Sony Xperia 10 V seven years later.

=== Software ===
Sony Xperia X Compact ships with Android 6.0.1 Marshmallow and is upgradable to Android 8.0 Oreo. In accordance with Sony's stated practices, the phone received system and security updates through September, 2018 (two years from release).

== Reception ==
Compared to previous models in the Compact subseries, the Xperia X Compact met with a mixed critical reception. Spec-wise it was not as powerful as the flagship Xperia XZ, which some people felt was a downgrade for a compact variant. Its build quality was also criticized, as well as the lack of waterproof that was present on its predecessor Sony Xperia Z5 Compact.
