= Lenovo Vibe Z2 Pro =

Android-based smartphone

The Lenovo Vibe Z2 Pro is an Android smartphone released in 2014.

== Design and performance ==
The Vibe Z2 Pro has a 6-inch, 2560-by-1440 pixel display. It has a Snapdragon 801 processor, 3 gigabytes of RAM, and 32 gigabytes of storage. It has a 16-megapixel rear camera with optical image stabilization, a dual LED flash, the ability to record 4K video, scene auto-detection, high dynamic range, and a low-light mode for night use. The battery has a capacity of 4,000 mAh. It has two micro-SIM slots. It has metallic unibody chassis with a metallic finish. The device measures 156 by 81.2 by 7.7 millimeters and weighs 176 grams.

The Vibe Z2 Pro runs Google's Android 4.4 "KitKat" operating system with Lenovo's Vibe 2.0 user interface. It will also come with apps such as SHAREit, for wireless content sharing, SYNCit, for data backups via cloud, and SEEit, for photo management, pre-installed.

=== Key specifications ===
- 5 MP Secondary Camera
- Android v4.4 (KitKat) OS
- 16 MP Primary Camera
- Wi-Fi Enabled
- 6-inch Capacitive Touchscreen
- 2.5 GHz Qualcomm Snapdragon 801 MSM8974AC Quad

Core Processor

=== General features ===
- Brand - Lenovo
- SIM Size - Micro SIM
- Call Features - Loudspeaker
- Touch Screen - Yes, Capacitive
- SIM Type Dual Sim - GSM + GSM
- Model ID - Vibe Z2 Pro

=== Display ===
- Resolution Quad HD, 2560 X 1440 Pixels
- Other Display

Features - Gorilla Glass 3

- Size - 6 Inches

== Reviews ==
The Deccan Chronicle stated, "When Lenovo asked its bunch of product development experts in Japan, China and the US, to create a flagship smartphone of its VIBE series, they were given a free hand without having to bother about a production budget. The product team delivered a monster of a phone, and it seems many in the team are professional photographers, or are at least interested in something more than selfies with multiple background options."
