= Sony Xperia XZ3 =

Android smartphone by Sony

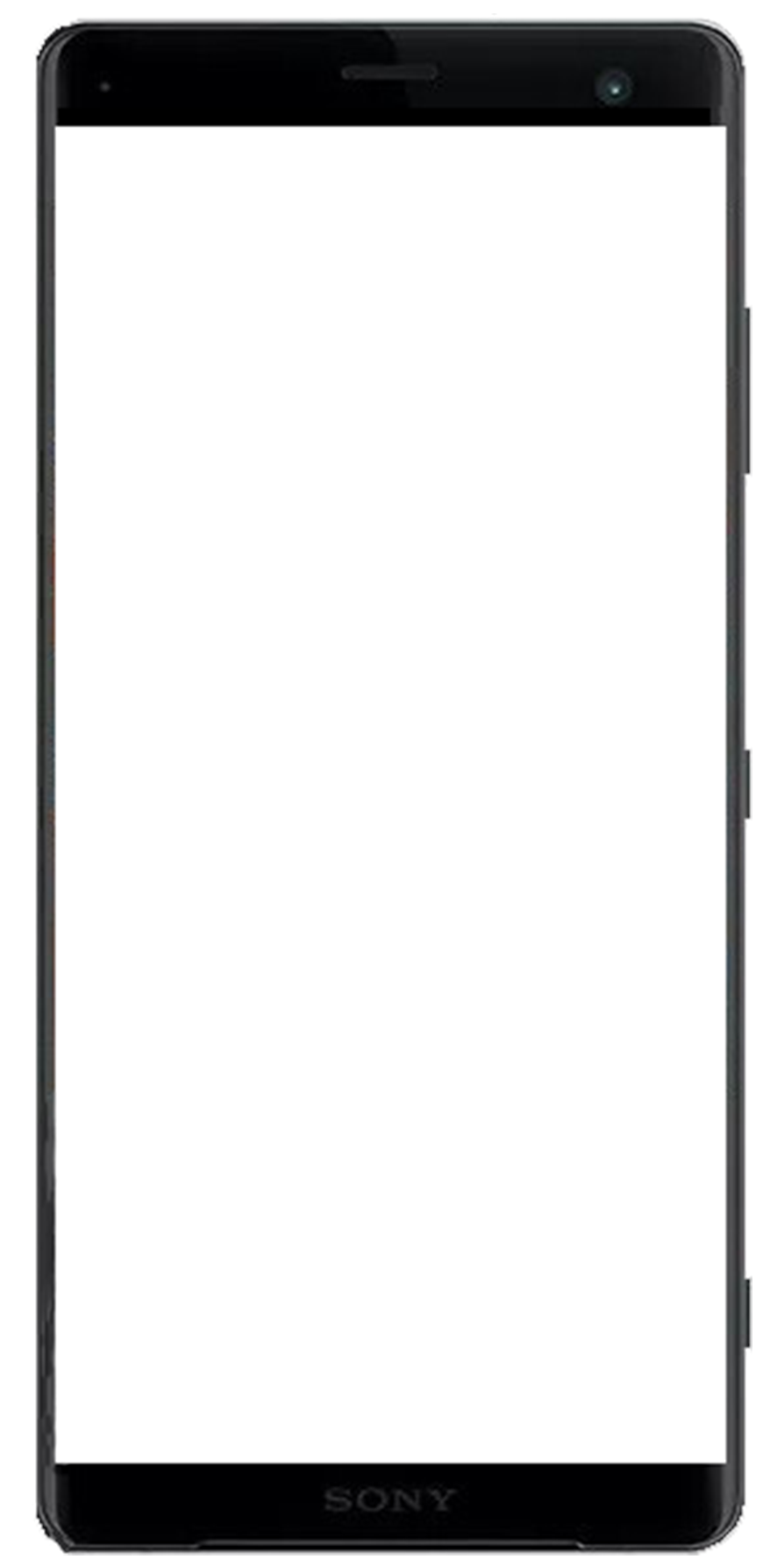
- Brand: Sony
- Manufacturer: Sony Mobile Communications
- Type: Smartphone
- Series: Sony Xperia
- Family: Sony Xperia X Series; Sony Xperia XZ Series
- First released: 5 October 2018; 8 years ago
- Predecessor: Sony Xperia XZ2
- Successor: Sony Xperia 1
- Compatible networks: 2G; 3G; 4G LTE
- Form factor: Slate
- Dimensions: 158 mm (6.2 in) H 73 mm (2.9 in) W 9.9 mm (0.39 in) D
- Weight: 193 g (6.8 oz)
- Operating system: Original: Android 9 "Pie"; Current: Android 10; Unofficial: Android 15 via LineageOS 22.2
- System-on-chip: Qualcomm Snapdragon 845
- CPU: Octa-core (4x2.7 GHz Kryo 385 Gold & 4x1.7 GHz Kryo 385 Silver)
- GPU: Adreno 630
- Memory: 4 GB or 6 GB (Taiwan and Hong Kong)
- Storage: Universal Flash Storage (UFS 2.1) 64 GB
- Removable storage: microSD, expandable up to 400 GB
- Battery: Non-removable 3300 mAh
- Rear camera: 19 MP Motion Eye™ camera (f/2.0, 25mm, 1/2.3", 1.22 μm), SteadyShot™ (gyro EIS), predictive phase detection and laser AF, RGBC-IR WB sensor, LED flash, 4K HDR at 30fps, 1080p at 30, 60fps or 960fps slo-mo
- Front camera: 13 MP (f/1.9, 1/3"), SteadyShot™ (gyro EIS), 1080p
- Display: 6.0 in (150 mm) QHD+ HDR BT.2020 P-OLED, ~537 pixel density, Gorilla Glass 5
- Sound: Stereo speakers
- Connectivity: Wi-Fi 802.11 a/b/g/n/ac (2.4/5GHz); Bluetooth 5.0; USB-C; NFC; GPS; Galileo; GLONASS; BeiDou; QZSS (SO-01L, SOV39 and 801SO models only); 1seg (SO-01L, SOV39 and 801SO models only); Osaifu-Keitai (SO-01L, SOV39 and 801SO models only)
- Data inputs: Sensors: Accelerometer; Barometer; Fingerprint scanner (rear-mounted); Gyroscope; Proximity sensor
- Model: H8416, H9436, H9493, SO-01L, SOV39, 801SO
- Codename: Akatsuki (PF42)
- Website: Official Website

The Sony Xperia XZ3 is an Android smartphone manufactured and marketed by Sony. Part of the Xperia X series, the device was announced to the public at a press conference held at the annual 2018 IFA Berlin event on August 30, 2018. It is the first Xperia device with an OLED display, and it features the same Dynamic Vibration System as seen on the Xperia XZ2. It was the last phone in the Xperia XZ series and the last phone in the Xperia X series overall before Sony moved into a new naming scheme for their Xperia line-up.

== Hardware ==
=== Design ===
The Xperia XZ3 uses Sony's new “Ambient Flow” design, similar to that on the XZ2, however it comes with an 6 inches (150 mm) curved OLED display, which is wrapped around a new 7000 series aluminium frame. The front and back glass on the device are both made of Corning Gorilla Glass 5. The fingerprint scanner is also rear-mounted, as seen on the Xperia XZ2 and Xperia XZ2 Premium. The phone features two front-facing speakers, supposedly the same units used on the XZ2.

The Xperia XZ3's dimensions are 158 mm (6.2 in) in height, with a width of 73 mm (2.9 in) and a depth of 9.9 mm (0.39 in) and weighs approximately 193 g (6.8 oz).

=== Display and performance ===
Sony had not used OLED panels in their smartphones previously, however the XZ3 is the first Sony smartphone to come with an OLED panel. It is a 6 inches (150 mm) QHD+ (2880×1440) display, with a 2:1 aspect ratio (marketed as 18:9). Being a Sony device, it features their TRILUMINOS and X-Reality technology and supports 10-bit colour, which means it is certified for the BT.2020 standard and HDR10 playback.

The XZ3 is powered by the Qualcomm Snapdragon 845, coupled with either 4 or 6 GB of LPDDR4X RAM and the Adreno 630 GPU. The device only comes with one internal storage option of 64 GB with 4 GB of RAM in most markets, however it is sold with 64 GB of storage and 6 GB of RAM in Taiwan.

=== Camera ===
Sony is using the familiar IMX400 sensor in the XZ3. This sensor was first featured in the XZs and XZ Premium. It has a RAM chip sandwiched between the sensor and on control circuitry layers which serves as a large and fast buffer to where the sensor can temporarily offload a significant amount of captured data before transferring it to the phone's internal memory for processing.

The same MotionEye camera setup from the XZ2 is used in this device. It consists of a 19 MP 1/2.3” Exmor RS for mobile sensor with a 1.22 μm pitch, f/2.0 aperture and 25 mm wide G lens. It uses Sony's BIONZ image processing engine. Furthermore, it is also capable of shooting 960 fps Super Slow Motion video.

=== Battery ===
The Xperia XZ3 comes with a non-removable, 3300 mAh battery. With the XZ3, Sony has abandoned QuickCharge 3.0 in favour of USB Power Delivery (USB-PD), but it still includes Qnovo Adaptive Charging. This allows the device to monitor the cell's electrochemical processes in real time and adjust charging parameters accordingly to minimize cell damage and extend the battery unit's lifespan.

=== Variants ===
XZ3 Variants list
Model	Bands	Regions	References
H8416 (Single SIM)	GSM: 850, 900, 1800, 1900 MHz UMTS: 800, 850, 900, 1700/2100 (AWS), 1900, 2100 MHz LTE: Bands 1, 2, 3, 4, 5, 7, 8, 12, 13, 17, 19, 20, 25, 26, 28, 38, 39, 40, 41, 66	Austria, Croatia, Czech Republic, France, Germany, Greece, Hungary, Iberia, Ireland, Italy, Netherlands, Portugal, South Korea, Switzerland, United Kingdom, USA	
H9436 (Dual SIM)	GSM: 850, 900, 1800, 1900 MHz UMTS: 800, 850, 900, 1700/2100 (AWS), 1900, 2100 MHz LTE: Bands 1, 2, 3, 4, 5, 7, 8, 12, 13, 17, 19, 20, 25, 26, 28, 38, 39, 40, 41, 66	France, Germany, Greece, Nordic Countries, Poland, Russia, Slovenia, Ukraine, United Kingdom, Slovakia	
H9493 (Dual SIM)	GSM: 850, 900, 1800, 1900 MHz UMTS: 800, 850, 900, 1700/2100 (AWS), 1900, 2100 MHz LTE: Bands 1, 2, 3, 4, 5, 7, 8, 12, 13, 17, 19, 20, 25, 26, 28, 38, 39, 40, 41, 66	Taiwan, Hong Kong (6 GB RAM variant)	
SO-01L (Single SIM)	GSM: 850, 900, 1800, 1900 MHz UMTS: 800, 850, 2100 MHz LTE: Bands 1, 3, 4, 5, 7, 12, 13, 17, 19, 21, 28, 38, 39, 40, 41, 42	Japan (NTT DoCoMo carrier model)	
SOV39 (Single SIM)	GSM: 850, 900, 1800, 1900 MHz UMTS: 800, 850, 2100 MHz LTE: Bands 1, 3, 5, 7, 13, 17, 18, 26, 28, 38, 39, 40, 41	Japan (au by KDDI carrier model)	
801SO (Single SIM)	GSM: 850, 900, 1800, 1900 MHz UMTS: 850, 900, 1700/2100 (AWS), 1900, 2100 MHz LTE: Bands 1, 2, 3, 4, 8, 11, 12, 17, 28, 38, 39, 40, 41, 42	Japan (SoftBank Mobile carrier model)	

== Software ==
The Xperia XZ3 is the first Android device to be launched with Android 9 Pie. It includes a new feature from Sony called "Side Sense", which is a custom drawer-like interface that is built-in to the stock Xperia launcher, it can be triggered by tapping twice anywhere along the curved display edge of the XZ3. Soon, Sony made the Android 10 update available to the device.
