= Sony Xperia XZ1 =

Android smartphone by Sony

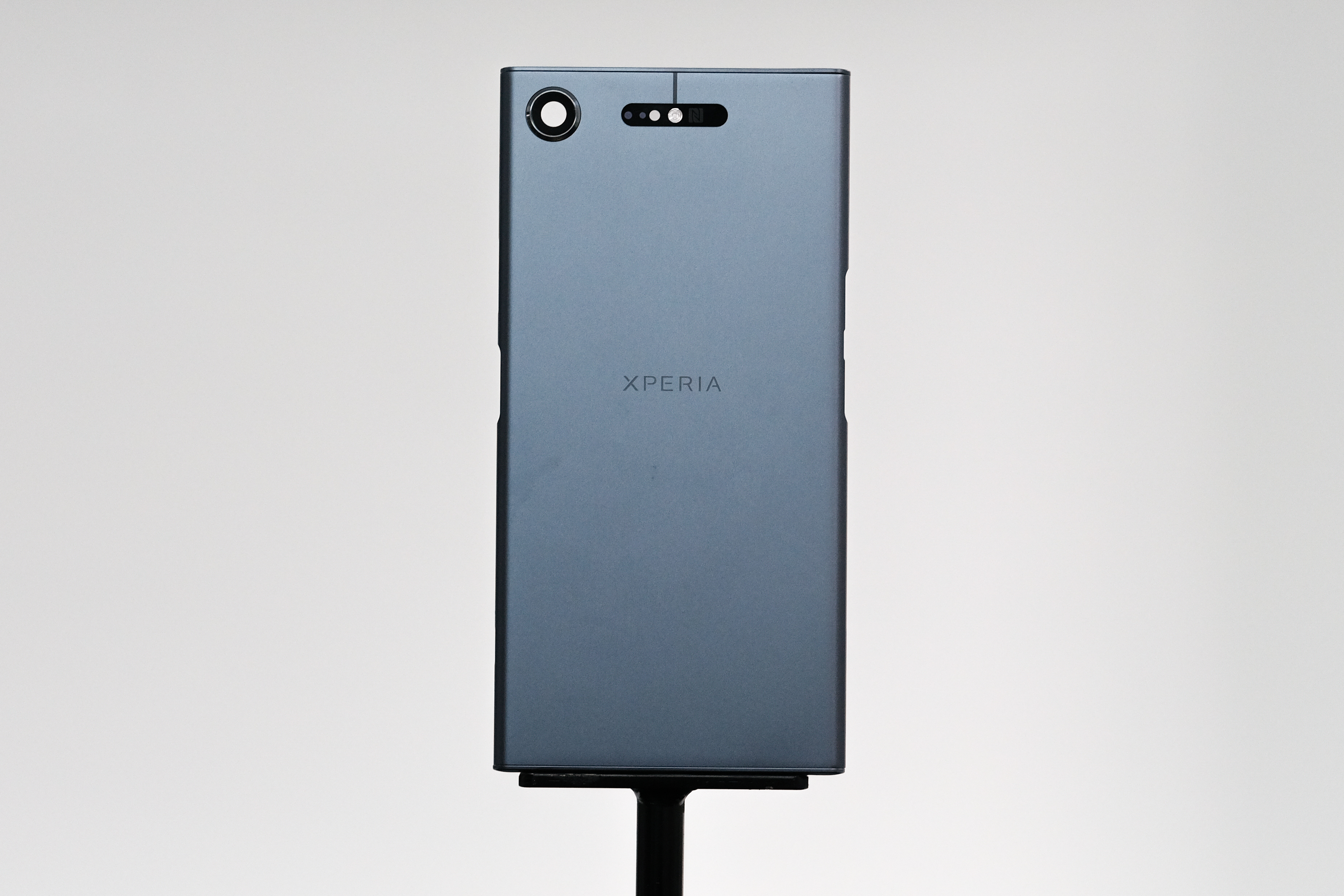
- Brand: Sony
- Manufacturer: Sony Mobile Communications
- Type: Touchscreen smartphone
- Series: Sony Xperia
- First released: 31 August 2017; 8 years ago
- Predecessor: Sony Xperia XZ
- Successor: Sony Xperia XZ2
- Related: Sony Xperia XZ1 Compact
- Compatible networks: HSPA, GSM & LTE
- Form factor: Slate
- Dimensions: 148 mm (5.8 in) H 73.4 mm (2.89 in) W 7.4 mm (0.29 in) D
- Weight: 155 g (5.5 oz)
- Operating system: Android 8.0 "Oreo" (Upgradable to Android 9 "Pie")
- System-on-chip: Qualcomm Snapdragon 835 MSM8998
- CPU: Octa-core (quad 2.35 GHz + quad 1.9 GHz) 64-bit Kryo processor
- GPU: Adreno 540
- Memory: 4 GB LPDDR4X RAM
- Storage: 64 GB UFS
- Removable storage: microSDXC; expandable up to 256 GB (hybrid slot for G8342)
- Battery: Non-removable Li-ion 2,700 mAh
- Rear camera: 19 MP Motion Eye™ Camera, 1/2.3'' memory-stacked IMX400 image sensor, Exmor RS for mobile (1.22μm), BIONZ, RGBC-IR, Laser AF, Predictive Hybrid AF, Predictive Capture, Quick launch, 5x Clear Image Zoom, 25mm Wide Angle G Lens, f/2.0 4K (2160p) video recording, 1080p 960 fps super slow motion video recording, SteadyShot with Intelligent Active Mode (5-axis stabilization)
- Front camera: 13 MP 1/3.06'' Exmor RS for mobile sensor, with Quick launch and 22mm Wide Angle Lens and f/2.0 aperture, autofocus
- Display: 5.2 in (130 mm) 1080p HDR IPS LCD (1080 x 1920 px); TRILUMINOS Display for mobile with X-Reality for mobile, Dynamic Contrast Enhancement, sRGB 138%, 424 ppi
- Connectivity: Wi-Fi; DLNA; GPS/GLONASS/BeiDou/Galileo; Bluetooth 5 with aptX and LE; USB 3.1 (Type-C port, USB charging, Quick Charge 3.0)
- Data inputs: Multi-touch, capacitive touchscreen, proximity sensor
- Model: G8341, G8343 (Canada) and G8342 (dual SIM)
- Codename: Poplar (PF31)
- Website: Official Website
- References: www.gsmarena.com/sony_xperia_xz1-8804.php

The Sony Xperia XZ1 is an Android smartphone manufactured and marketed by Sony. Part of the Xperia X series, the device was announced to the public along with the Xperia XZ1 Compact at the annual IFA 2017 on August 31, 2017. It is the direct successor to the Sony Xperia XZ according to Sony, and is the latest flagship after the Xperia XZ Premium.

The Xperia XZ1, along with the Xperia XZ1 Compact, were recognized as the first Android smartphones to come with the recently launched Android 8.0 Oreo operating system pre-installed. Its highlight features are the HDR-enabled 5.2" FHD IPS display and a new world's-first-in-a-smartphone 3D-modelling feature that doesn't need a dual camera setup.

== Hardware ==
=== Design and Build ===
Sony refreshes the trademark Xperia Loop Surface design for the Xperia XZ1. But instead of using glass surfaces like the Xperia XZ Premium, the XZ1 is mostly consisted of a wraparound metal chassis, making up the back and sides of the device, with subtly-curved nylon top and bottom edges giving a more smoother approach to the overall design. The most defining change in the XZ1 as well as the XZ Premium is the placement of the image sensors at the back. It is now arranged across the camera lens, centered along the top, as opposed to being longitudinally placed below the lens like on the XZs. But unlike the XZ Premium which has a glass back panel, on the XZ1, the NFC antenna is housed alongside the image sensors, placed directly at the center of the glass window. A durable scratch-resistant glass panel made of Corning's Gorilla Glass 5 adorns the front of the device. Dual front-firing stereo speakers with Sony's new S-Force Front Surround stereo, producing 50% more sound pressure than previous Xperia models for a more immersive surround sound, along with a 13 MP front camera, ambient light and proximity sensor and a notification LED make up the Xperia XZ1's front panel.

The Xperia XZ1's dimensions are 148 mm (5.8 in) in height, with a width of 73.4 mm (2.89 in) and a depth of 7.4 mm (0.29 in) and weighs approximately 155 g (5.5 oz). It has an IP rating of IP65/68, making it dust-proof and water resistant for over 1.5 meters and 30 minutes. The device also features a fingerprint sensor embedded into the power button that can be used to unlock the phone and secure it from unauthorized access. This feature, however, is disabled on units sold in the US.

=== Display and Performance ===
The Xperia XZ1 is one of the first smartphones with an HDR display. But unlike the Xperia XZ Premium, the Xperia XZ1 abandons the 4K UHD resolution, settling for a 1080p FHD display instead. It is HDR10 compliant just like the XZ Premium, but has no Dolby Vision support. The 5.2 in (130 mm) IPS LCD screen has a pixel density of 424 ppi and features Sony's TRILUMINOS display and X-Reality for mobile technology.

It is powered by the same Qualcomm Snapdragon 835 (MSM8998) found in the Xperia XZ Premium, built on 10 nm process technology with 8 custom Kryo processors (4x 2.35 GHz and 4x 1.9 GHz), 4 GB of LPDDR4X RAM and uses the Adreno 540 for graphics rendering. The device also has an internal storage of 64 GB and comes in single-SIM and dual-SIM versions, with both featuring LTE Cat. 16 with Gigabit-class speeds, a 4x4 MIMO antenna design and a total of 10 antennas. It also has microSD card expansion of up to 256 GB (in a hybrid slot for the dual-SIM variant).

=== Camera ===
Sony debuted in the Xperia XZs and the XZ Premium the world's first three-layer stacked image sensor with DRAM for smartphones. Known as the Sony IMX400, the sensor features a RAM chip sandwiched in between the sensor and control circuitry layers which serves as a large and fast buffer to where the sensor can temporarily offload a significant amount of captured data before transferring it to the phone's internal memory for processing. This enables the camera to record super slow-motion videos at 960 fps, at a steady 720p resolution. Recording at super slow motion is limited to 0.18 seconds per buffer though, due to limitations.

The Xperia XZ1 borrows the Motion Eye Camera from the Xperia XZ Premium and XZs. It comprises a 19 MP 1/2.3” Exmor RS for mobile sensor with a 1.22 μm pixel pitch, f/2.0 aperture and 25 mm wide G Lens. It also features 4K video recording, which supports SteadyShot video stabilization alongside the standard 1080p/30 fps, a high-speed 1080p/60 fps and a 120 fps recording in 720p options. The front selfie camera has a 13-megapixel sensor (1/3.06") with 22 mm, f/2.0 lens, a 90-degree wide angle lens and SteadyShot with Intelligent Active Mode (5-axis stabilization).

The Xperia XZ1 has the Triple Image Sensing technology that started with the Xperia XZ as standard. It is composed of the image sensing (CMOS sensor with PDAF), distance sensing (Laser AF sensor) and color sensing (RGBC-IR sensor) systems, featuring a hybrid autofocus that utilizes Phase Detection (PDAF) to lock focus on a subject within 0.03 seconds, and also includes phase and contrast detection along with predictive motion tracking. It also has a laser autofocus sensor for fast tracking and locking focus on a subject, as well as an RGBC-IR (RedGreenBlueClear-InfraRed) color sensor that assists the white balance function of the camera by providing additional data about the light conditions of the surrounding environment. It also has SteadyShot with Intelligent Auto in addition to the five-axis sensor-shift image stabilization first seen in the Xperia XZ. The Motion Eye Camera in the Xperia XZ1 also has Predictive Capture. When it detects fast-paced movement, the camera automatically captures a maximum of four photos before the shutter button is pressed, and lets the user select the best one afterwards. This is done without any user intervention and is possible due to the same built-in RAM chip on the image sensor used in capturing the 960 fps super slow-motion videos.

The newest addition to the Motion Eye Camera of the Xperia XZ1 is a 3D scanning feature without the need of a dual-camera setup. It utilizes the IMX400's built-in DRAM to offload captured data before being combined and built up in Sony's proprietary 3D Creator application, to create a rendition of the subject, be it a face of a person, a whole head or any object the user may wish to capture. The user is then given the option to use the rendered 3D image on the included animated figures, or have it 3D-printed by Sony-approved 3D printing services, all within the app itself.

=== Battery ===
The Xperia XZ1 is powered by a non-removable 2700 mAh battery. Charging and data transfer is handled by a USB-C port with support for USB 3.1. It also has Qualcomm's QuickCharge 3.0 and Qnovo adaptive charging technology built-in. This allows the device to monitor the cell's electrochemical processes in real time and adjust charging parameters accordingly to minimize cell damage and extend the battery unit's lifespan. It also comes with Battery Care, a Sony proprietary feature, that controls the charging process of the phone by learning and recognizing the user's charging patterns, preventing the phone from damaging the battery's cells from excessive heat due to overcharging. For example, when charging overnight, Battery Care stops the initial charge to 90 percent and then continue charging until full where it left off the next day.

=== Audio and Connectivity ===
The Xperia XZ1 comes with a standard 3.5 mm audio jack for plugging in wired headphones. It also has improved LDAC, an audio coding technology developed by Sony, that enables the transmission of 24bit/96 kHz High-Resolution (Hi-Res) audio content over Bluetooth at up to 990 kbit/s, three times faster than conventional audio streaming codecs, to compatible audio devices. Other connectivity options include Bluetooth 5 with aptX and Low Energy, NFC, dual-band Wi-Fi a/b/g/n/ac with 2x2 MIMO antennas, Wi-Fi Direct, screen casting via Miracast, Google Cast, DLNA, GPS (with A-GPS), GLONASS, BeiDou and Galileo satellite positioning. Like most flagships today, the Xperia XZ1 has no FM radio support.

== Software ==
The Sony Xperia XZ1 was the first smartphone to launch with Android 8.0 Oreo out of the box. The version of Android shipped with the XZ1 adhered to Sony's customary minimalist approach to customizing its interface. The OS also included Smart Stamina battery saving modes and multimedia apps.
