= Xperia XZ2 Premium =

2018 Android smartphone

Sony Xperia XZ2 Premium
- Brand: Sony
- Manufacturer: Sony Mobile Communications
- Type: Smartphone
- Series: Sony Xperia
- First released: 30 July 2018; 8 years ago
- Predecessor: Sony Xperia XZ Premium
- Successor: Sony Xperia 1
- Related: Sony Xperia XZ2; Sony Xperia XZ2 Compact
- Compatible networks: 2G; 3G; 4G; 4G LTE
- Form factor: Slate
- Dimensions: 158 mm (6.2 in) H 80 mm (3.1 in) W 11.9 mm (0.47 in) D
- Weight: 236 g (8.3 oz)
- Operating system: Android 8.0 "Oreo"; Upgradable to Android 10
- System-on-chip: Qualcomm Snapdragon 845
- CPU: Octa-core (4x2.7 GHz ARM Cortex-A75 & 4x1.7 GHz ARM Cortex-A55)
- GPU: Adreno 630
- Memory: 6 GB LPDDR4X RAM
- Storage: 64 GB UFS
- Removable storage: microSD, expandable up to 400 GB
- Battery: Non-removable 3540 mAh
- Rear camera: Dual: 19 MP (f/1.8, 25mm, 1/2.3", 1.22 μm) + 12 MP B/W (f/1.6, 1/2.3", 1.55 μm), 5-axis gyro EIS, phase detection- and laser-based autofocus, LED flash, video recording at up to 4K 30fps, 1080p at 60fps (continuous) or 960fps (burst slo-mo)
- Front camera: 13 MP (f/2.0, 22mm, 1/3", 1.12 μm), 5-axis giro EIS, 1080p
- Display: 5.8 in (150 mm) 4K HDR IPS LCD, ≈760 pixel density, Gorilla Glass 5
- Sound: Frontal stereo speakers
- Connectivity: Wi-Fi 802.11 a/b/g/n/ac (2.4/5 GHz) Bluetooth 5.0, USB-C, NFC, location (GPS, Galileo, GLONASS, BeiDou)
- Data inputs: Sensors: Accelerometer; Barometer; Fingerprint scanner (rear-mounted); Gyroscope; Proximity sensor
- Codename: Aurora (PF12)
- Website: Official Website

The XZ2 Premium is a 2018 Android smartphone, designed and manufactured by Sony, part of the Xperia series of products. Like other Premium-labeled models from the company, the XZ2 Premium featured a 4K LCD display. It is the first Sony smartphone to feature a dual camera design on the rear: a 19-megapixel colored image sensor as main camera, and a 12-megapixel monochrome sensor for low-light photography. Both are 1/2.3-inch in sensor size.

== Hardware ==
=== Design and Build ===
The XZ2 Premium comes with the new "Ambient Flow" design. It consists of a metal side frame, metal top and bottom edges that together make up the chassis of the phone, and scratch-resistant front and back glass panels made of Corning Gorilla Glass 5. The most defining change in the XZ2 Premium, as well as the Xperia XZ2 and XZ2 Compact, is the placement of the camera on the back. It is now placed on the center, as opposed to being placed on the top left side like on the previous Xperia smartphones. The NFC antenna is at the top of camera. The front of the phone consists of dual front-firing stereo speakers, one on the top bezel and the other on the bottom bezel, along with a 13 MP front camera, ambient light sensor, proximity sensor and notification LED.

The Xperia XZ2 Premium's dimensions are 158 mm (6.2 in) in height, with a width of 80 mm (3.1 in) and a depth of 11.9 mm (0.47 in) and weighs approximately 236 g (8.3 oz).

=== Display and Performance ===
The Xperia XZ2 Premium has a 4K IPS LCD display with quantum dot technology, marketed as "Triluminous"; it measures 5.8 in (150 mm) diagonally, and has a pixel density of 765 ppi. The phone supports the decoding HDR10 videos, but not Dolby Vision ones; however, as the display backlight does not have local dimming capabilities, its contrast ratio is limited at 1:1500 even when displaying HDR content.

The phone integrates the Snapdragon 845 SoC. Its CPU consists of 4 Cortex-A75 and 4 -A55 cores in a big.LITTLE configuration. The device has a 64 GB UFS storage and 6 GB of LPDDR4X RAM. Both single- and dual-SIM version are available, but none with CDMA-2G or -3G support. It has a 4x4 MIMO antenna design, and a total of 8 antennas. A single optional microSD card of at most 512 GB in capacity may be mounted, next to the first SIM card slot, which, on dual-card systems, would prevent the installation of the second SIM.

=== Camera ===
The XZ2 Premium has a dedicated RGBC-IR sensor for white-balance detection, and a laser autofocus sensor. that started with the Xperia XZ as standard. It is composed of the image sensing (CMOS sensor with PDAF), distance sensing (Laser AF sensor) and color sensing (RGBC-IR sensor) systems, featuring a hybrid autofocus that utilizes Phase Detection (PDAF) to lock focus on a subject within 0.03 seconds, and also includes phase and contrast detection along with predictive motion tracking. It also has a laser autofocus sensor for fast tracking and locking focus on a subject, as well as an RGBC-IR (RedGreenBlueClear-InfraRed) color sensor that assists the white balance function of the camera by providing additional data about the light conditions of the surrounding environment. It also has SteadyShot with Intelligent Auto in addition to the five-axis sensor-shift image stabilization first seen in the Xperia XZ. The Motion Eye Dual Camera in the Xperia XZ2 Premium also has Predictive Capture.

When it detects fast-paced movement, the camera automatically captures a maximum of four photos before the shutter button is pressed, and lets the user select the best one afterward. This is done without any user intervention and is possible due to the same built-in RAM chip on the image sensor used in capturing the 960 fps super slow-motion videos.

=== Battery ===
The Xperia XZ2 Premium is powered by a non-removable 3540 mAh battery. Charging and data transfer is handled by a USB-C port with support for USB 3.1 and Qi Wireless Charging. It also has Qualcomm's QuickCharge 3.0 and Qnovo adaptive charging technology built-in. This allows the device to monitor the cell's electrochemical processes in real time and adjust charging parameters accordingly to minimize cell damage and extend the battery unit's lifespan. An optional charging control feature may limit the battery charging speed based on use patterns; however, the feature does not offer means of customization and user cannot choose a custom charging schedule, nor limit the battery's maximum charge level. For example, when charging overnight, Battery Care stops the initial charge to 90 percent and then continue charging until full where it left off the next day.

=== Audio and Connectivity ===
The Xperia XZ2 Premium does not feature a 3.5 mm audio jack. When connecting to a Bluetooth headset, the phone supports several audio codecs, including the AAC, aptX, LDAC, in addition to the standard SBC. The Xperia XZ2 Premium has no FM radio.

== Software ==
The Sony Xperia XZ2 Premium launched with the Android 8.0 Oreo operating system, along with Smart Stamina battery saving modes and Sony's proprietary multimedia apps. It can be upgraded to Android 9 Pie (released on November 7, 2018), and Android 10 (released in 2020). As of 2026, the XZ2 Premium has official LineageOS support for version 22.2, based on Android 15 and Linux kernel 4.9.
