= Sony Xperia Z5 Compact =

Android smartphone by Sony Xperia

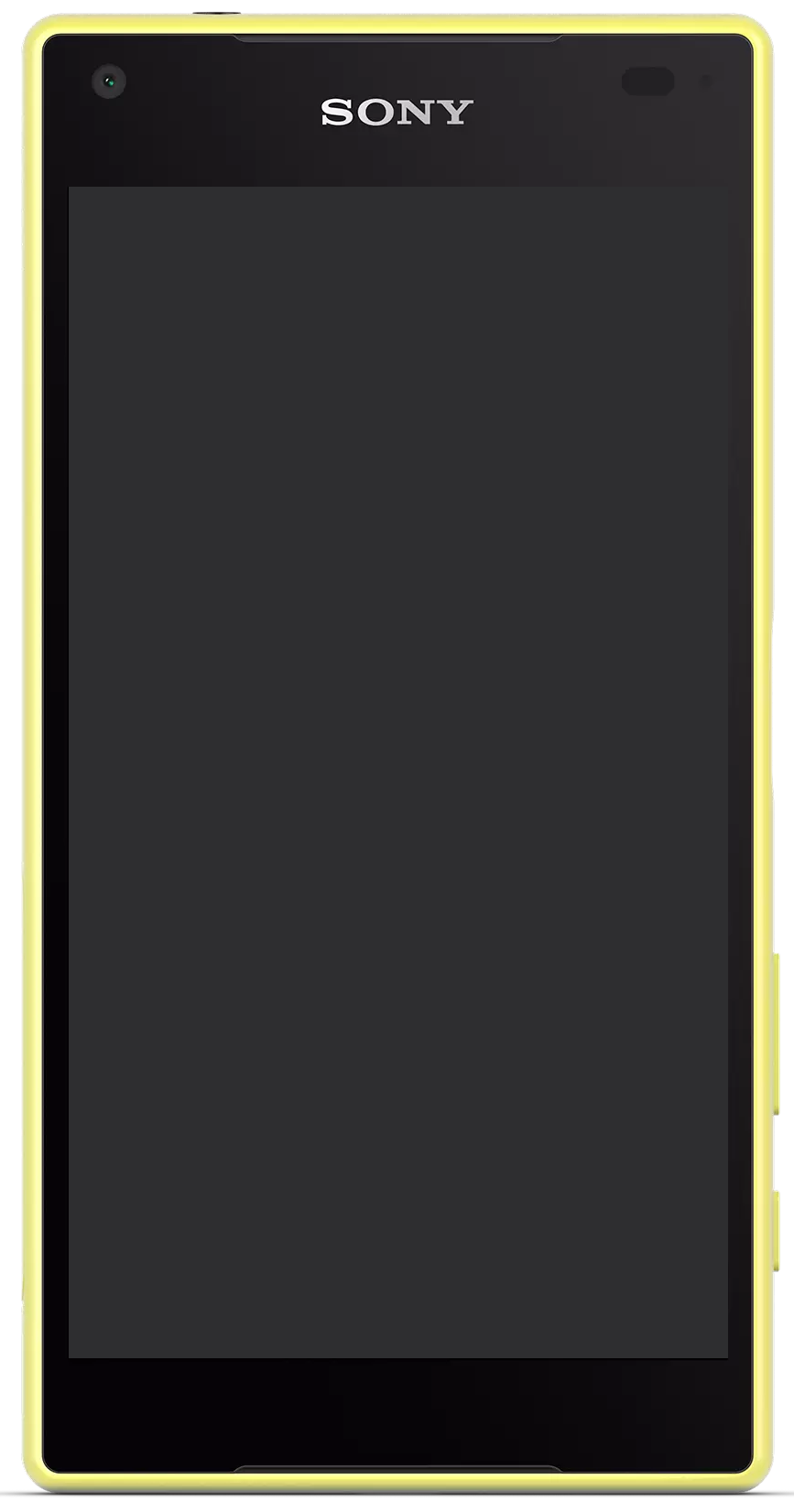
- Brand: Sony
- Manufacturer: Sony Mobile Communications
- Type: Compact touchscreen smartphone
- Series: Sony Xperia
- First released: 2 September 2015; 10 years ago
- Availability by region: 1 October 2015; 10 years ago (Taiwan); 24 October 2015; 10 years ago (Singapore); 12 November 2015; 10 years ago (Japan, SO-02H model exclusively for NTT DoCoMo)
- Predecessor: Sony Xperia Z3 Compact (Global); Sony Xperia A4 (Japan)
- Successor: Sony Xperia X Compact
- Related: Sony Xperia Z5; Sony Xperia Z5 Premium; Sony Xperia Z5 Compact SO-02H (Japan)
- Form factor: Slate
- Dimensions: 127 mm (5.0 in) H 65 mm (2.6 in) W 8.9 mm (0.35 in) D
- Weight: 138 g (4.9 oz)
- Operating system: Android 5.1.1 Lollipop Upgradable to Android 7.1.1 Nougat
- System-on-chip: Qualcomm Snapdragon 810
- CPU: Quad-core 1.5 GHz Cortex-A53 & Quad-core 2.0 GHz Cortex-A57 (2.0 GHz Qualcomm MSM8994 Octa Core)
- GPU: Adreno 430
- Memory: 2 GB
- Storage: 32 GB
- Removable storage: Up to 200 GB microSDXC
- Battery: non-user removable Li-ion 2700 mAh
- Rear camera: 23 MP back-side illuminated sensor, LED flash 4K (2160p) video recording @ 30 frames/s; 1080p video recording @ 60 frames/s; 720p video recording @ 120 frames/s, 0.03 seconds Hybrid Autofocus
- Front camera: 5 MP (1080p video recording)
- Display: 4.6 in (120 mm) 720p IPS LCD; HD 1280x720 px TRILUMINOS™ Display with Live Color LED; X-Reality Engine for Mobile; Dynamic Contrast Enhancer
- Connectivity: Wi-Fi; DLNA; GPS/GLONASS/BeiDou; NFC; Bluetooth 4.1; MHL 3.0; USB 2.0 (Micro-B port, USB charging, Quick Charge 2.0); USB OTG; 3.50 mm (0.138 in) headphone jack, 5 pole, fingerprint sensor
- Data inputs: Multi-touch, capacitive touchscreen, proximity sensor
- Model: E5803, E5823, SO-02H
- Codename: Suzuran
- Other: List: Available in graphite black, white, yellow and coral IP65 / IP68 (Dust protected, Water jet protected & Waterproof) Digital Noise cancellation Sony Exmor R for Mobile Sony Exmor RS for Mobile Sony G Lens 1/2.3 Aperture sensor Sony BIONZ image processor SteadyShot Smile shutter SensMe TrackID Sony Entertainment Network PlayStation App Remote Play 1seg (SO-02H variant only) Osaifu-Keitai (SO-02H variant only) NOTTV (SO-02H variant only) POBox Plus (SO-02H variant only)
- Website: Official Website

The Sony Xperia Z5 Compact is an Android smartphone produced by Sony. Part of the Sony Xperia Z series, the device, at that point known by the project code name "Suzuran", was unveiled along with the Xperia Z5 and Xperia Z5 Premium during a press conference at IFA 2015 on September 2, 2015. The device was first launched in Taiwan on October 1, 2015, and in Japan on November 12, 2015. It is the successor of the Sony Xperia Z3 Compact. In Japan it is known as the SO-02H, exclusive to NTT Docomo.

== Specifications ==
=== Hardware ===
The device is down-scaled version of the Xperia Z5. Unlike its predecessor, the Z5 compact features a fingerprint reader and a 23 Megapixel camera with 0.03 seconds Hybrid Autofocus that utilizes phase detection autofocus.

=== Software ===
Sony Xperia Z5 Compact ships with Android 5.1.1 Lollipop and is upgradable to Android 7.1.1 Nougat.

Preceded by Sony Xperia Z3 Compact (Sep-2014)	Sony Xperia Z5 Compact (Sep-2015); 2015	Succeeded by Sony Xperia X Compact
