= SteadyShot =

SteadyShot is the trademarked name of the integrated image stabilisation technologies used in Sony video camcorders, DSLR cameras, mirrorless cameras and on Sony Xperia smartphones and tablets. Different versions of these technologies are known as Super SteadyShot (SSS) in Sony's Cyber-shot product line, in addition to SteadyShot INSIDE (SSI) and Optical SteadyShot (OSS) in the Sony α family.

== Design ==
When a camera is operated hand-held, the operator's shaky hands can cause instabilities in the captured image stream. SteadyShot technology works inside the body of the camera. It uses motion sensors to detect the user's movements. SteadyShot then compensates for some of these movements, in some versions by moving the optics (OSS) and in some versions by moving the image sensor (also called IBIS: In Body Image Stabilisation) in an opposite direction to the movement.

This approach is contrasted to digital image stabilization in which the physical image is allowed to "track" the scene on the CCD by software to produce a stable image. The digital technique requires the pixel count to be increased to allow the image to move on the sensor while keeping reference points within the boundaries of the capture chip.

== Balanced Optical SteadyShot ==
Instead of moving only the sensor or only one of the lenses, Balanced Optical SteadyShot (BOSS) moves the whole lens block to compensate for camera shake. Sony claims this is 13 times more effective than previous versions of SteadyShot. This feature is unique to Sony camcorders and action cams. It was introduced in the beginning of 2012.

SteadyShot is entirely internal to the camcorder unlike external stabilisation systems such as the Steadicam.

== See also ==
- Image stabilization
