= Walkman =

Series of portable media players by Sony

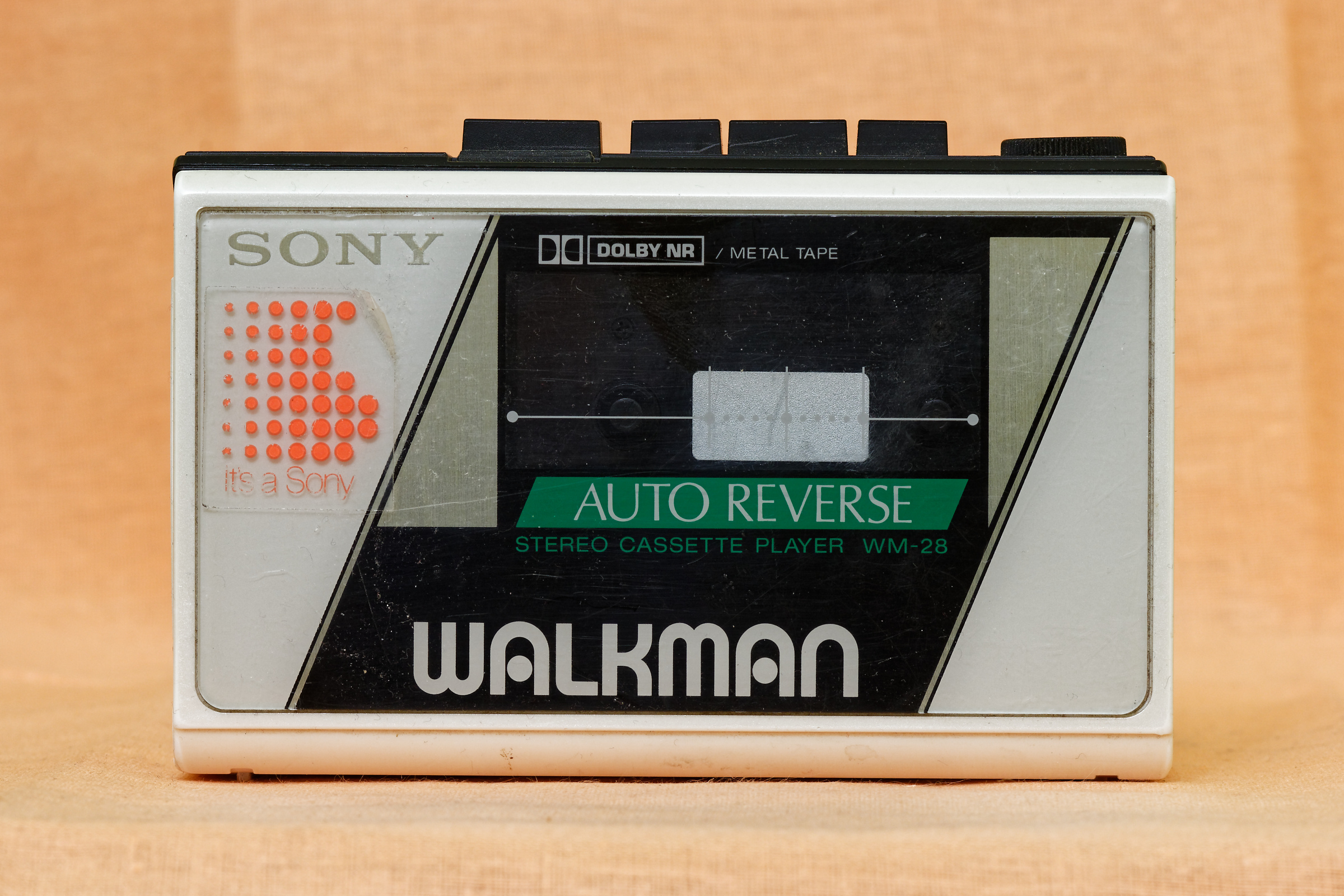
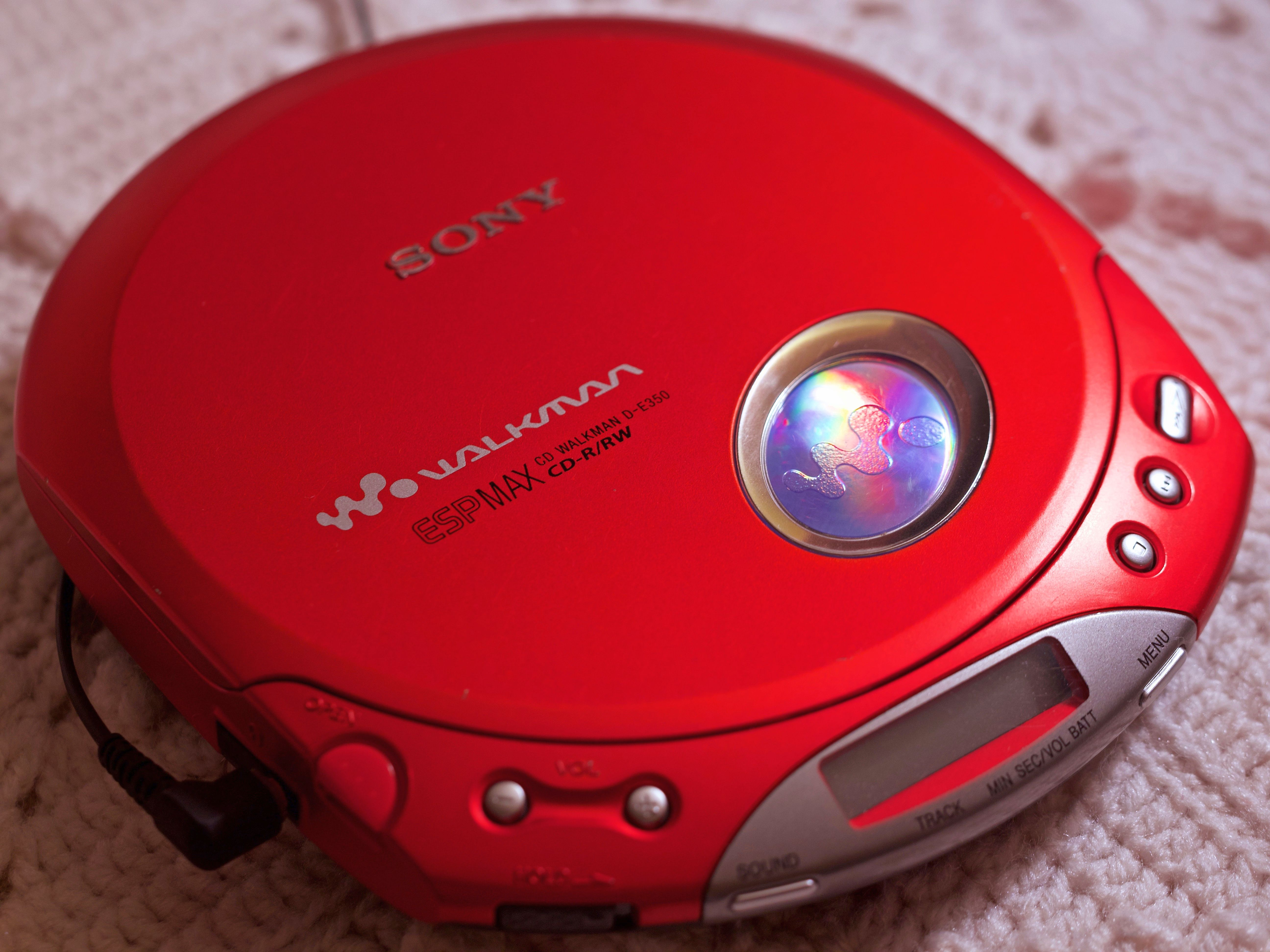
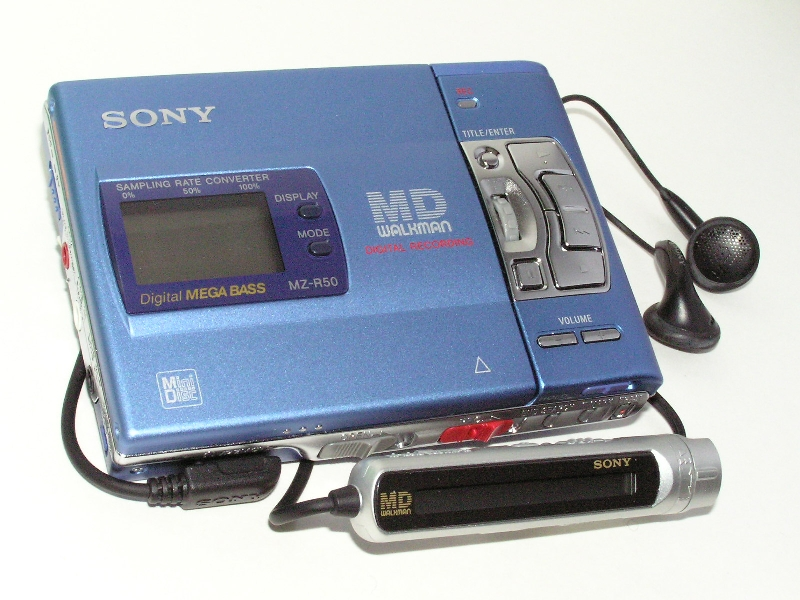
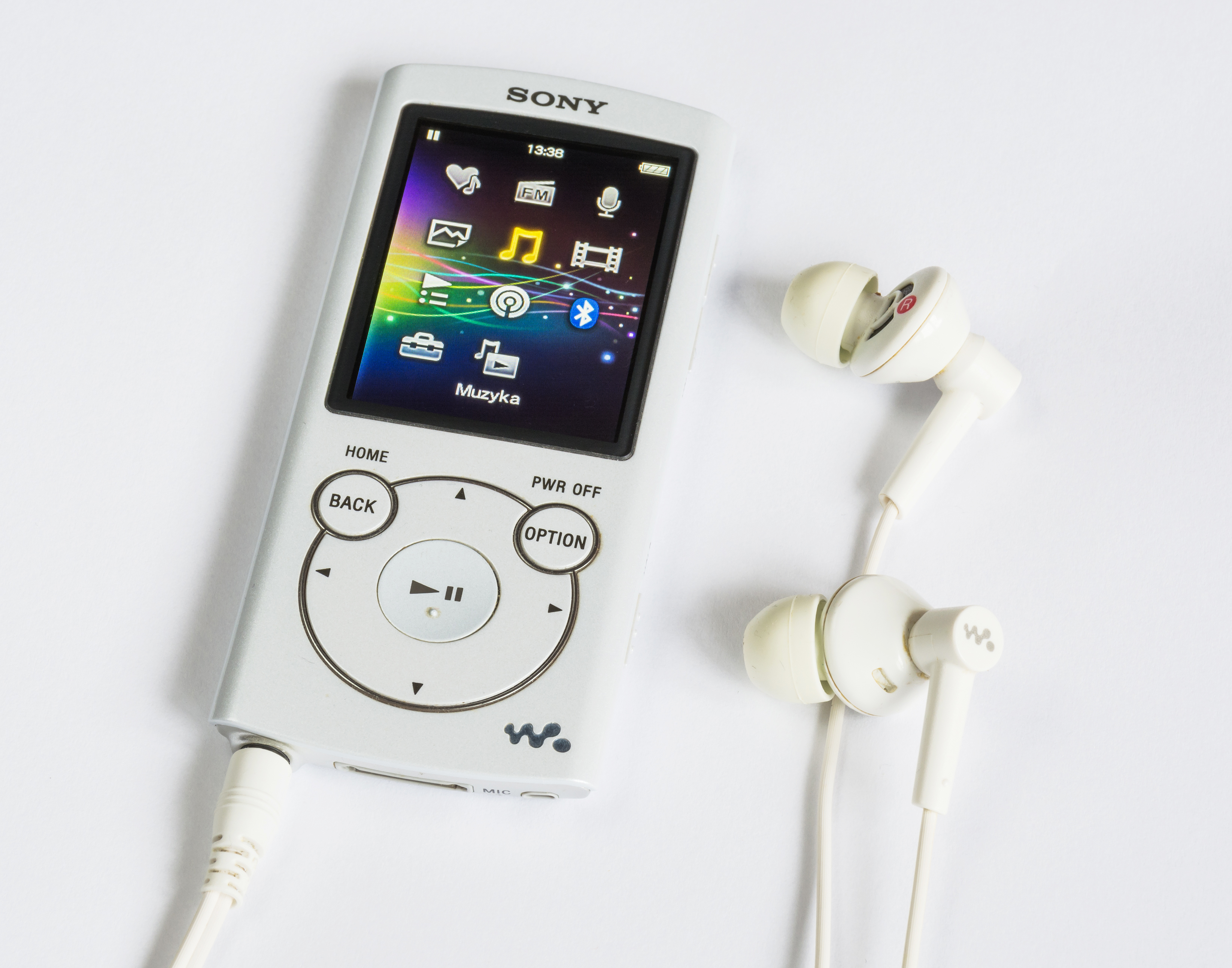
- Left to right from top: a cassette Walkman (1980s), a CD Walkman (2001), an MD Walkman (1998), a digital Walkman (2011)
- Manufacturer: Sony
- Type: Portable audio players and recorders
- Lifespan: 1 July 1979 – present
- Units sold: 385 million (all editions, as of 31 March 2009)
- Related: List of Sony Walkman products

Walkman (Japanese: ウォークマン, Hepburn: Wōkuman) is a brand of portable audio players manufactured by Sony since 1979. It was originally introduced as a portable cassette player and later expanded to include a range of portable audio products. Since 2011, the brand has referred exclusively to digital flash memory players.

The Walkman became widely popular during the 1980s for its portable design and private listening experience. It influenced popular culture by promoting individualized music consumption and supporting activities such as aerobics. Its widespread use gave rise to the "Walkman effect", a term describing how portable music devices and headphones allow listeners to control their sonic environment. In 1986, "Walkman" was added to the Oxford English Dictionary, and in some markets the term became a genericized trademark for portable audio players. The Walkman also contributed to the widespread adoption of the Compact Cassette format, which surpassed vinyl record sales in 1983. Sony sold approximately 220 million cassette-based Walkman units before ending production in 2010.

Sony also achieved commercial success with its CD-based models (originally marketed as the Discman, later rebranded as the CD Walkman), and by 2010, cumulative sales of all Walkman devices had reached around 400 million units. However, despite extensive marketing efforts, MiniDisc Walkman devices remained a niche product. In the digital era, Sony was unable to replicate the brand’s earlier success, as Apple's iPod range gained widespread popularity and limited international Walkman sales.

The Walkman’s influence on consumer electronics has been compared to later devices such as mobile phones and personal computers.

== History of the cassette Walkman ==
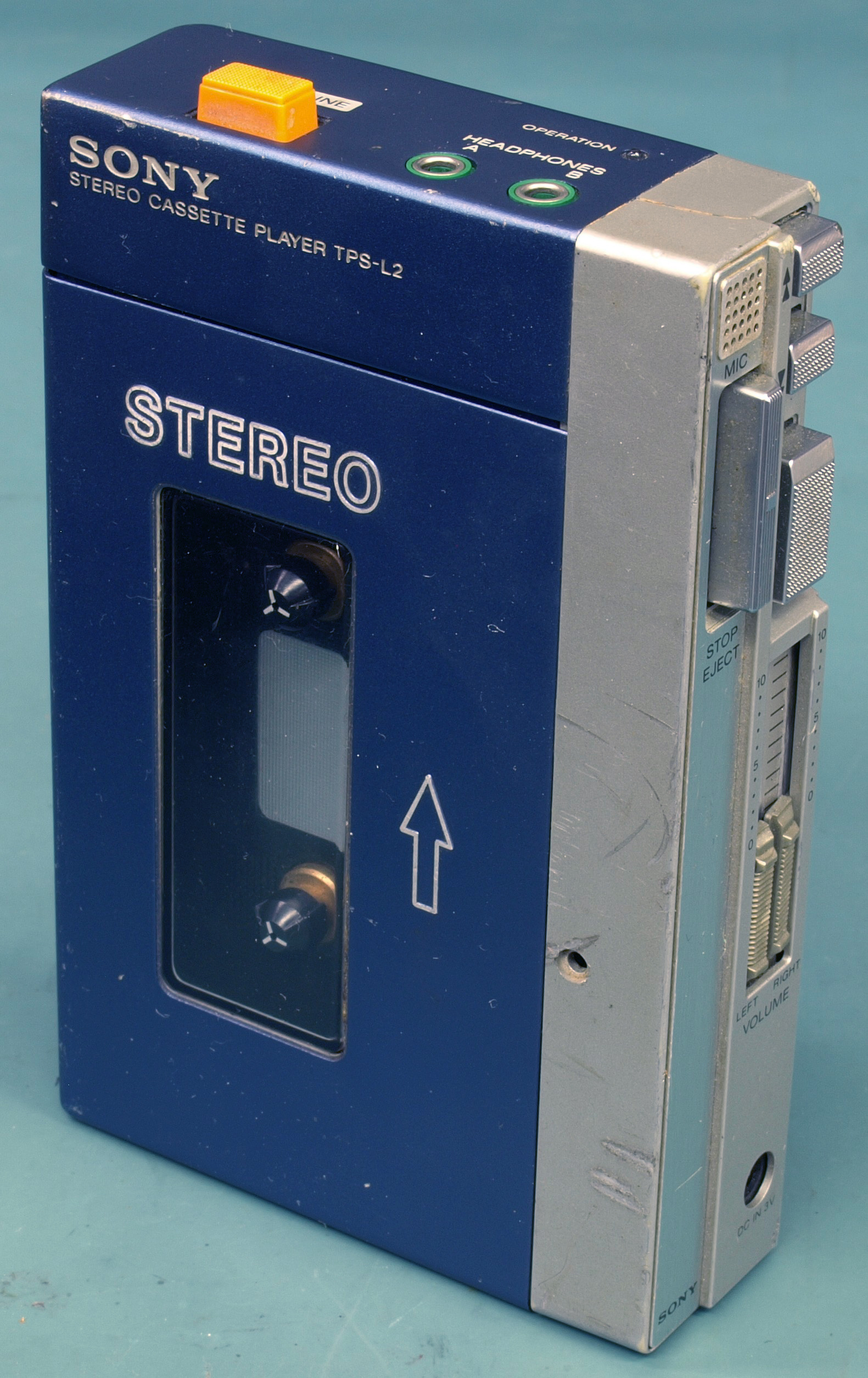
Original 1979 Sony Walkman TPS-L2

In March 1979, at the request of Masaru Ibuka, the audio department modified the small "Pressman" recorder used by journalists, into a smaller cassette player. After many people praised the good sound quality, Sony, under the leadership of Akio Morita, launched the Walkman in July 1979. Morita positioned Walkman in the youth market, emphasized youth, vitality, and fashion, and created a headset culture. In February 1980, he began to sell Walkman to the world, and in November 1980, he began to use the non-standard Japanese and English branding globally. The Walkman has sold more than 250 million units worldwide. When Morita was knighted in October 1992, the headline in the British newspapers The Sun and The Daily Telegraph was "Arise, Sir Sony Walkman".

The Compact Cassette was developed by the Dutch electronics firm Philips and released in August 1963. In the late 1960s, the introduction of prerecorded compact cassettes made it possible to listen to music on portable devices as well as on car stereos, though gramophone records remained the most popular format for home listening.

Portable tape players of various designs were available, but none of them were intended to be operated by a person as they were walking. In the 1970s, German-Brazilian inventor Andreas Pavel devised a method for carrying a player of this type on a belt around the waist, listening via headphones, but his "Stereobelt" concept did not include the required engineering advancements to yield high-quality sound reproduction while the tape player was subject to mechanical shock as would be expected on a person walking. Pavel later lost his suit claiming the Walkman idea as his own. Finally in 2003, with Pavel threatening to file infringement proceedings in the remaining territories where he held protective rights, Sony approached him with a view to settling the matter amicably, which led to both parties signing a contract and confidentiality agreement in 2004. The settlement was reported to be a cash payment in the "low eight figures" and ongoing royalties of the sale of certain Walkman models.

Sony co-founder Masaru Ibuka used the company's bulky TC-D5 cassette recorder to listen to music while traveling for business. He asked the executive deputy president Norio Ohga to design a playback-only stereo version optimized for walking. The metal-cased blue-and-silver Walkman TPS-L2, the world's first low-cost personal stereo, went on sale in Japan on 1 July 1979, and was sold for around ¥33,000 (or $150.00). Though Sony predicted it would sell about 5,000 units a month, it sold more than 30,000 in the first two months.

The original logo from 1981 to 2000

The Walkman was followed by a series of international releases; as overseas sales companies objected to the wasei-eigo name, it was sold under several names, including Sound-about in the United States, Freestyle in Australia and Sweden, and Stowaway in the UK. Eventually, in the early 1980s, Walkman caught on globally and Sony used the name worldwide. The TPS-L2 was introduced in the US in June 1980.

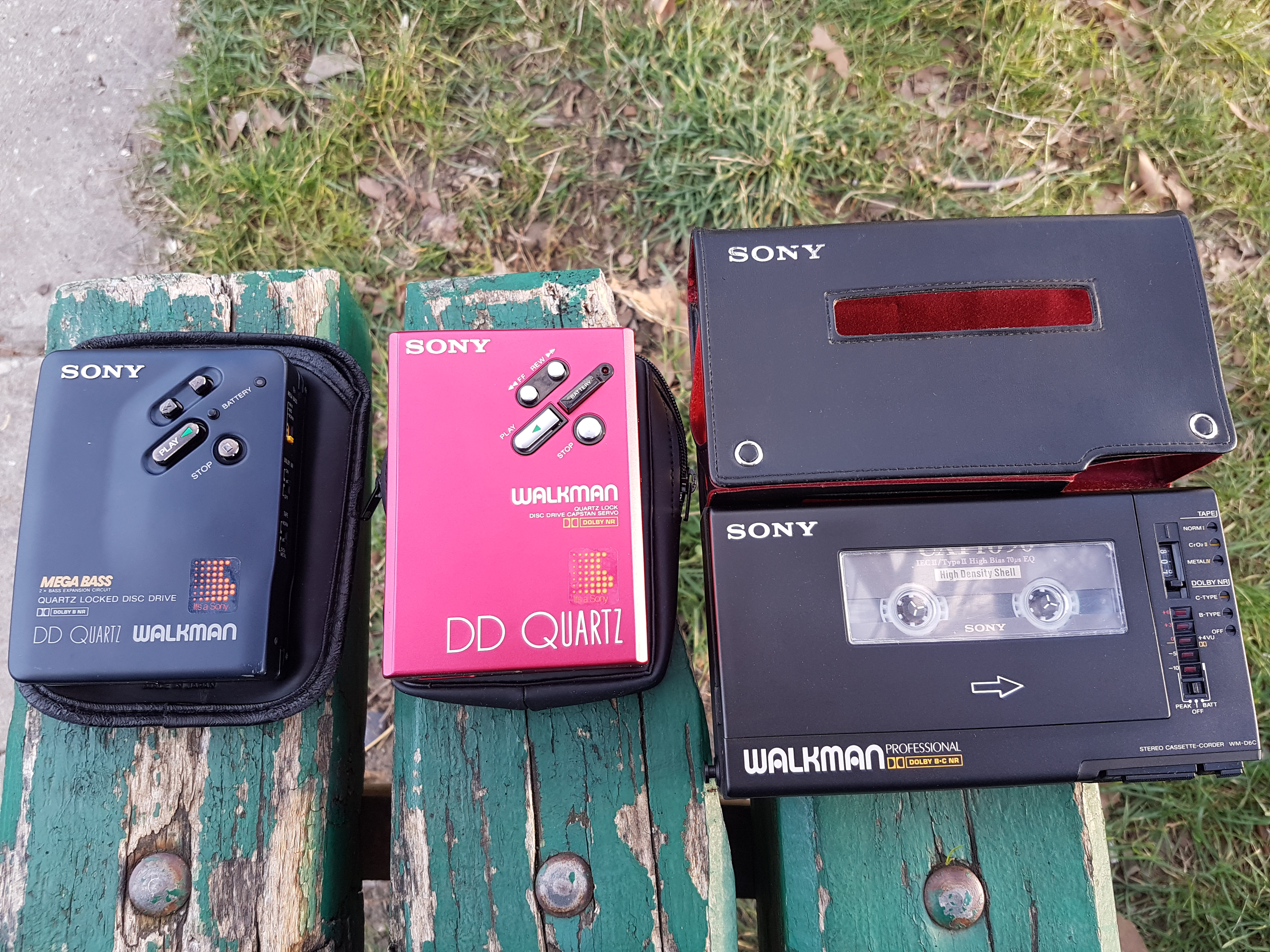
Three Walkman players, variously dating between 1984 and 1991

The 1980s was the decade of the intensive development of the Walkman lineup. In 1981, Sony released the second Walkman model, the WM-2, which was significantly smaller than the TPS-L2, thanks to the "inverse" mounting of the power-operated magnetic head and soft-touch buttons. Sony applied the "Walkman" brand to some transistor radios starting with the matching blue SRF-40 FM Walkman in 1980, and added a radio system to some Walkman cassette models starting with the model WM-F1 in 1982. The first model with Dolby noise-reduction system and an auto reverse function appeared in 1982. The first ultra-compact "cassette-size" Walkman was introduced in 1983, model WM-20, with a telescopic case. This allowed even easier carrying of a Walkman in bags or pockets. In October 1985, the WM-101 model was the first in its class with a "gum stick" rechargeable battery. In 1986 Sony presented the first model outfitted with remote control, as well as one with solar battery (WM-F107).

Within a decade of launch, Sony held a 50% market share in the United States and 46% in Japan.

In 1989, two limited edition 10th anniversary models were released (WM-701S/T) in Japan, made of brass and plated in sterling silver. Only a few hundred were built of each. A 15th anniversary model was also made on 1 July 1994, with vertical loading, and a 20th anniversary on 1 July 1999, with a prestige model.

By 1989, 10 years after the launch of the first model, over 100 million Walkmans had been sold worldwide. 150 million units were manufactured by 1995. By 1999, 20 years after the introduction of the first model, Sony sold 186 million cassette Walkmans.

The popularity of portable compact disc players in the 1990s led to the decline of the cassette Walkman, which was discontinued in Japan in 2010. The last cassette-based model available in the US was the WM-FX290W, which was first released in 2004.

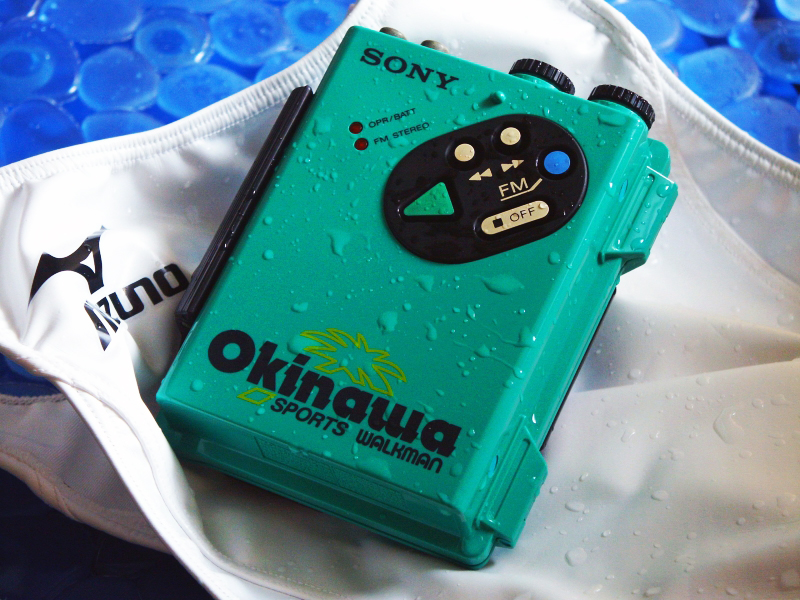
WM-F5 "Okinawa" Sports Walkman

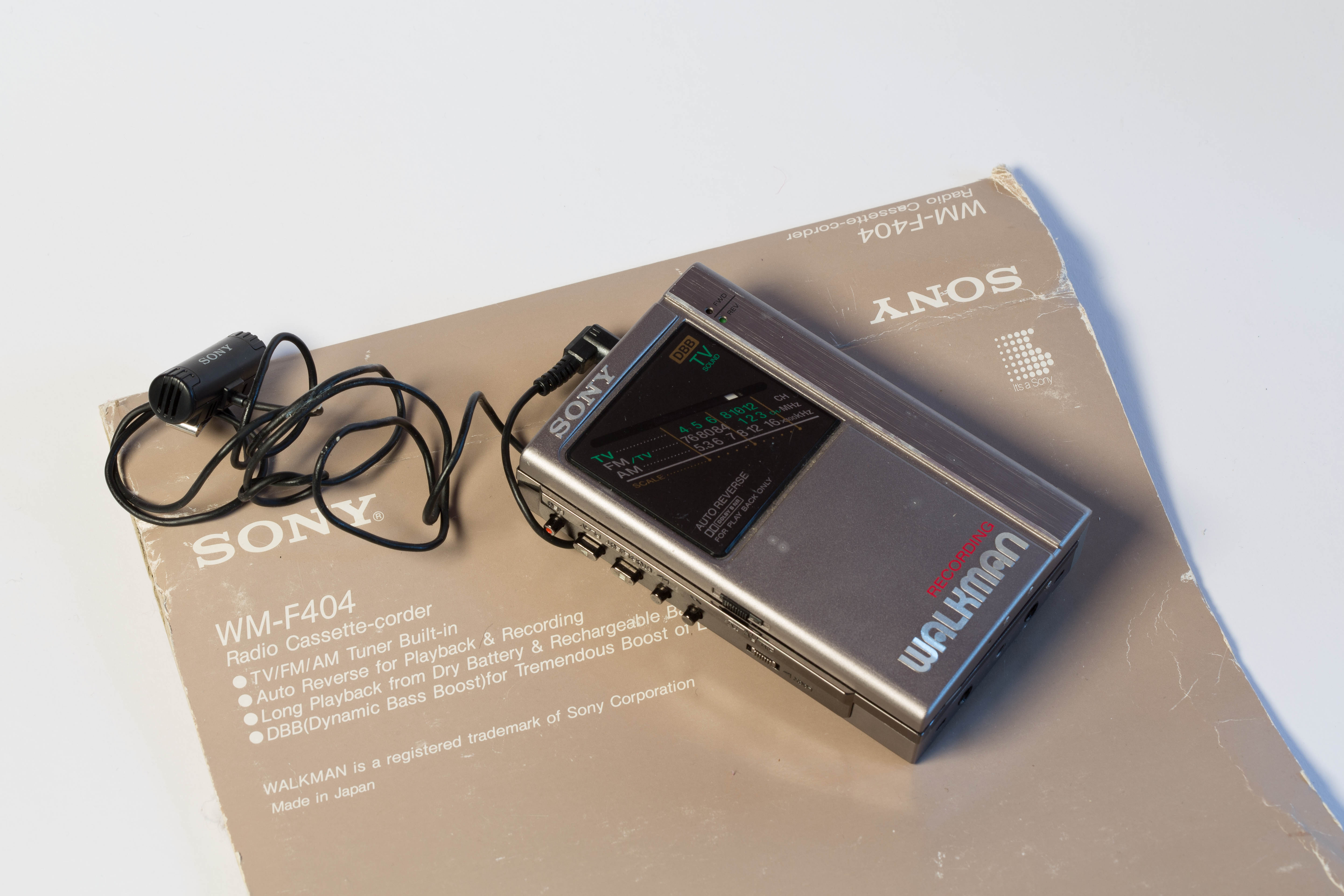
WM-F404, high-end model with TV tuner (1988)

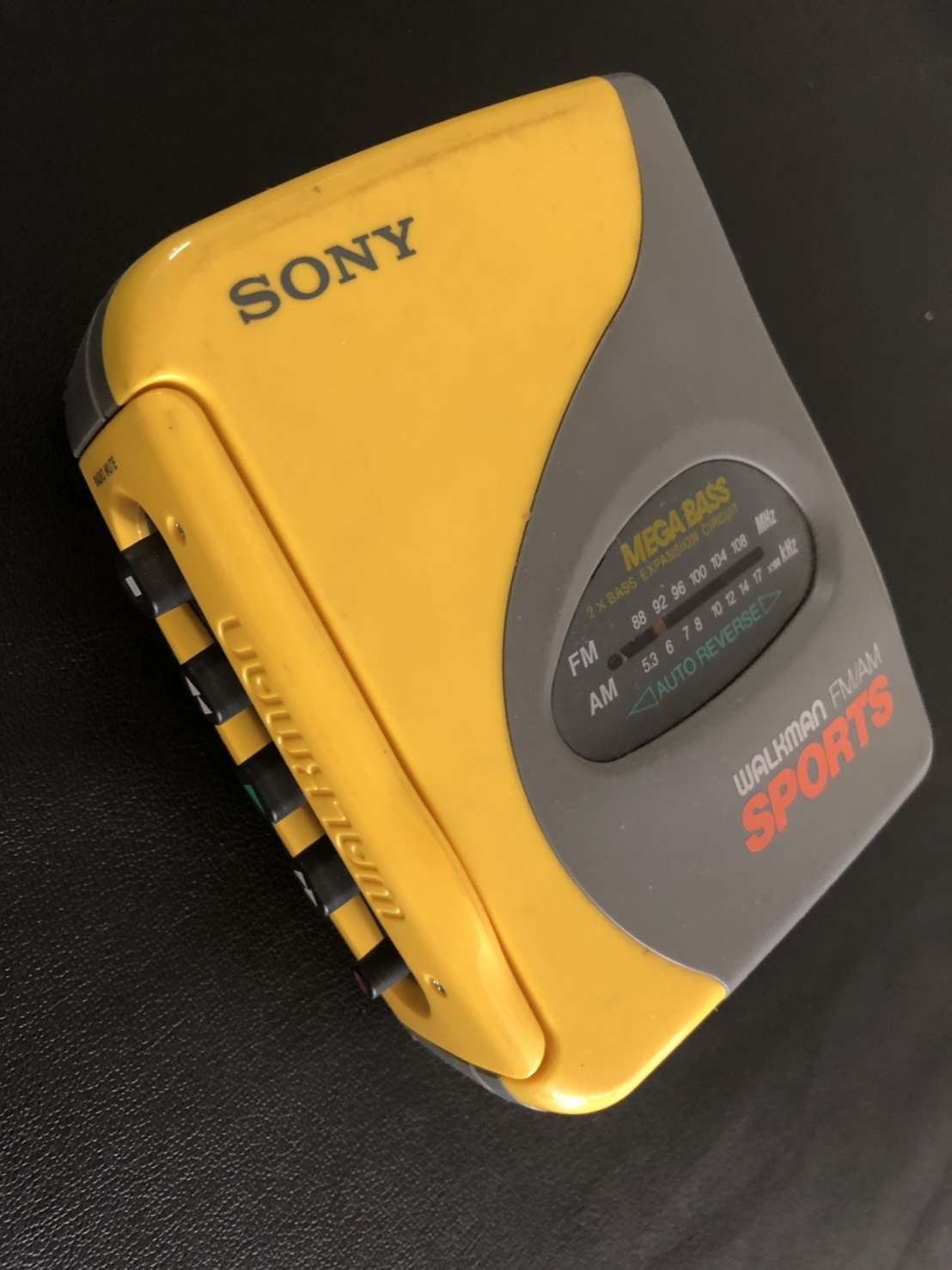
A "Sport" Walkman (1990s)

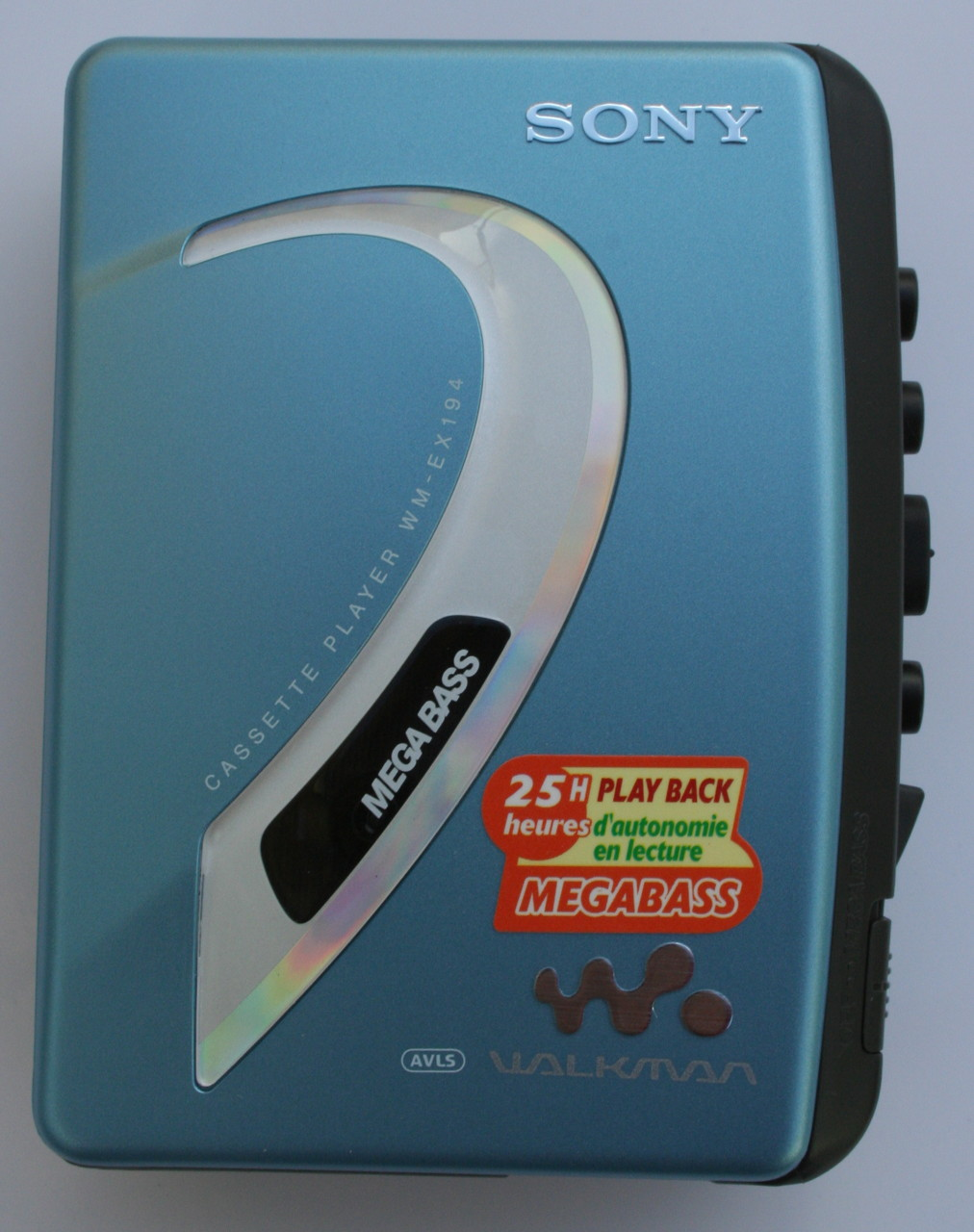
Sony Walkman WM-EX194 (2004)

== Portable radio receivers ==
Sports Walkman and some of non-sport cassette Walkman models has built-in radio receivers.

But as Sony produced portable radio receivers since 1960s, there is also personal stereo Walkman, were special variants of the same model targeted for different markets according to country-specific radio bands, for example, model SRF-37 has 4 variants:

- FM/AM Walkman SRF-M37 (Canada)
- FM/MW/LW Walkman SRF-M37L (Europe/Other countries) — the only portable longwave Walkman
- TV/Weather/FM/AM Walkman SRF-M37V (US) — the most portable TV and Weather radio Walkman
- Weather/FM/AM Walkman SRF-M37W (US) — the most portable Weather radio Walkman

Most of Walkman portable stereo varies in size between card deck and USB-stick, except for some of the Sports Walkman portable stereos, like Sports Walkman FM Stereo/AM Monocular Radio SRF-X90 which is larger than cassette Walkman Sport WM-SXF33 with built-in AM/FM stereo. Sports Walkman FM/AM Headset SRF-HM55 is all-in-one portable stereo.

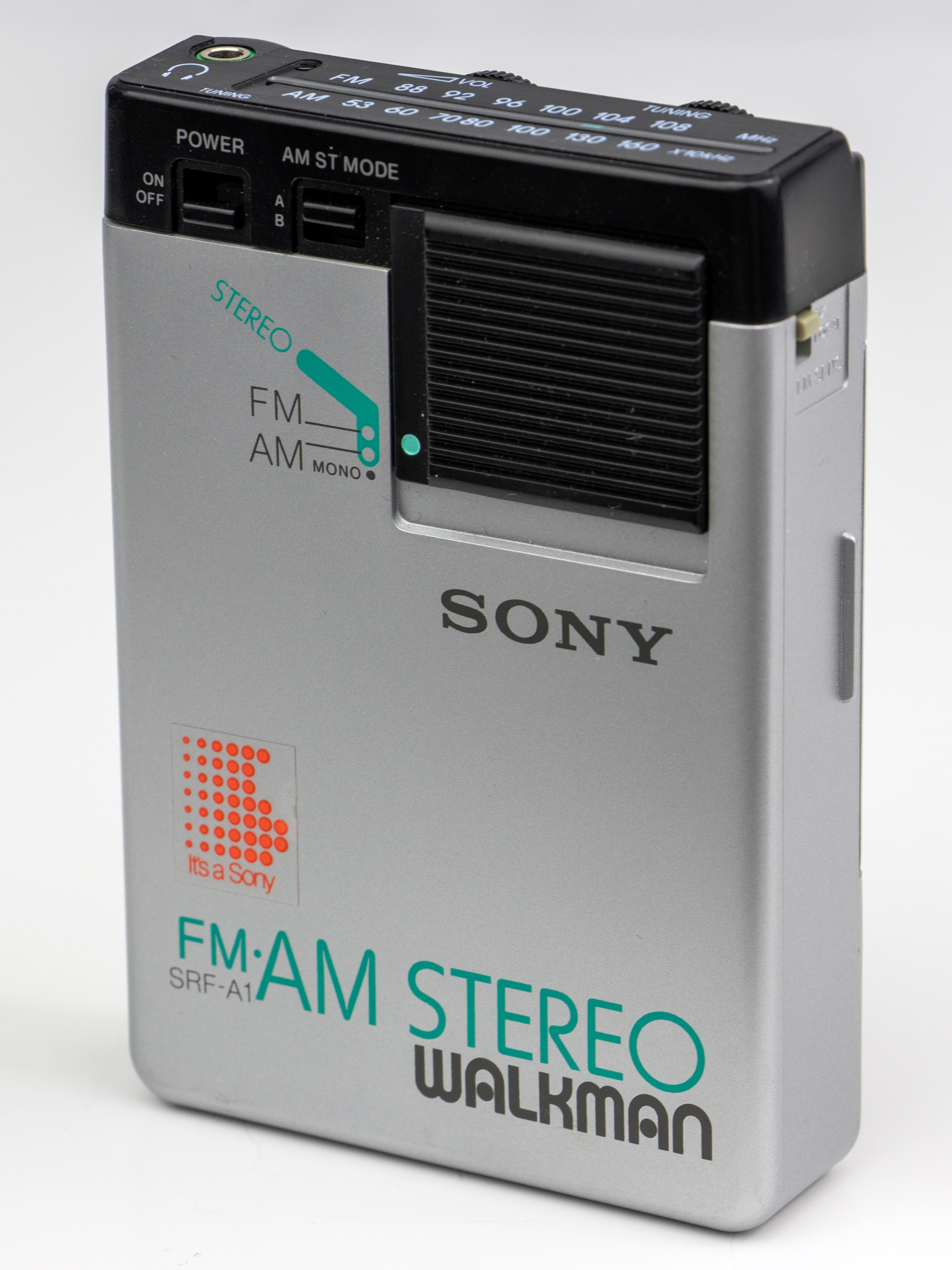
FM/AM Stereo Walkman SRF-A1

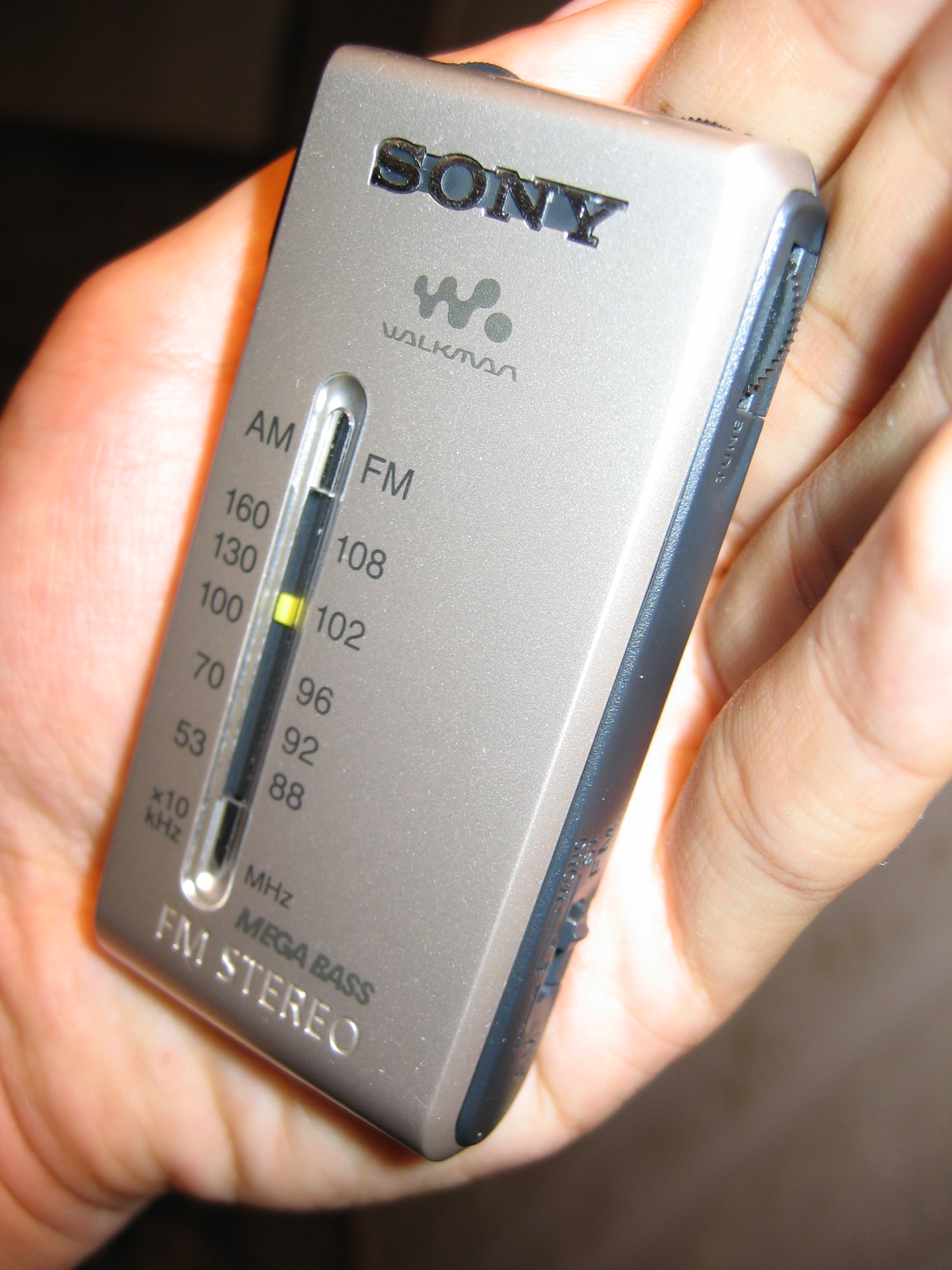
AM/FM Stereo Walkman SRF-S84

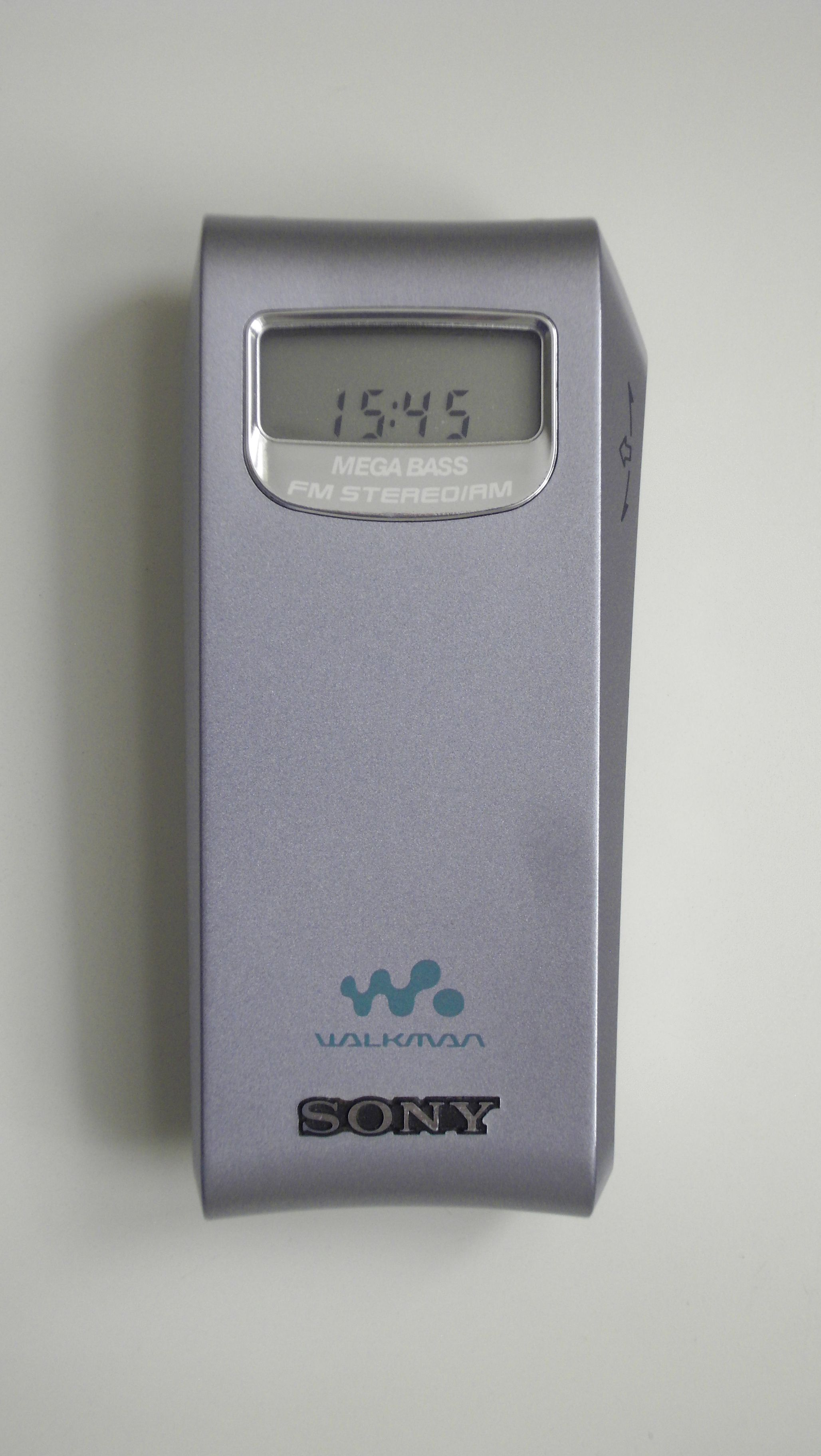
FM Stereo/AM Walkman SRF-M95

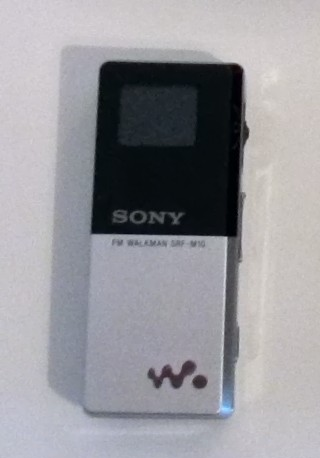
FM Stereo Walkman SRF-M10

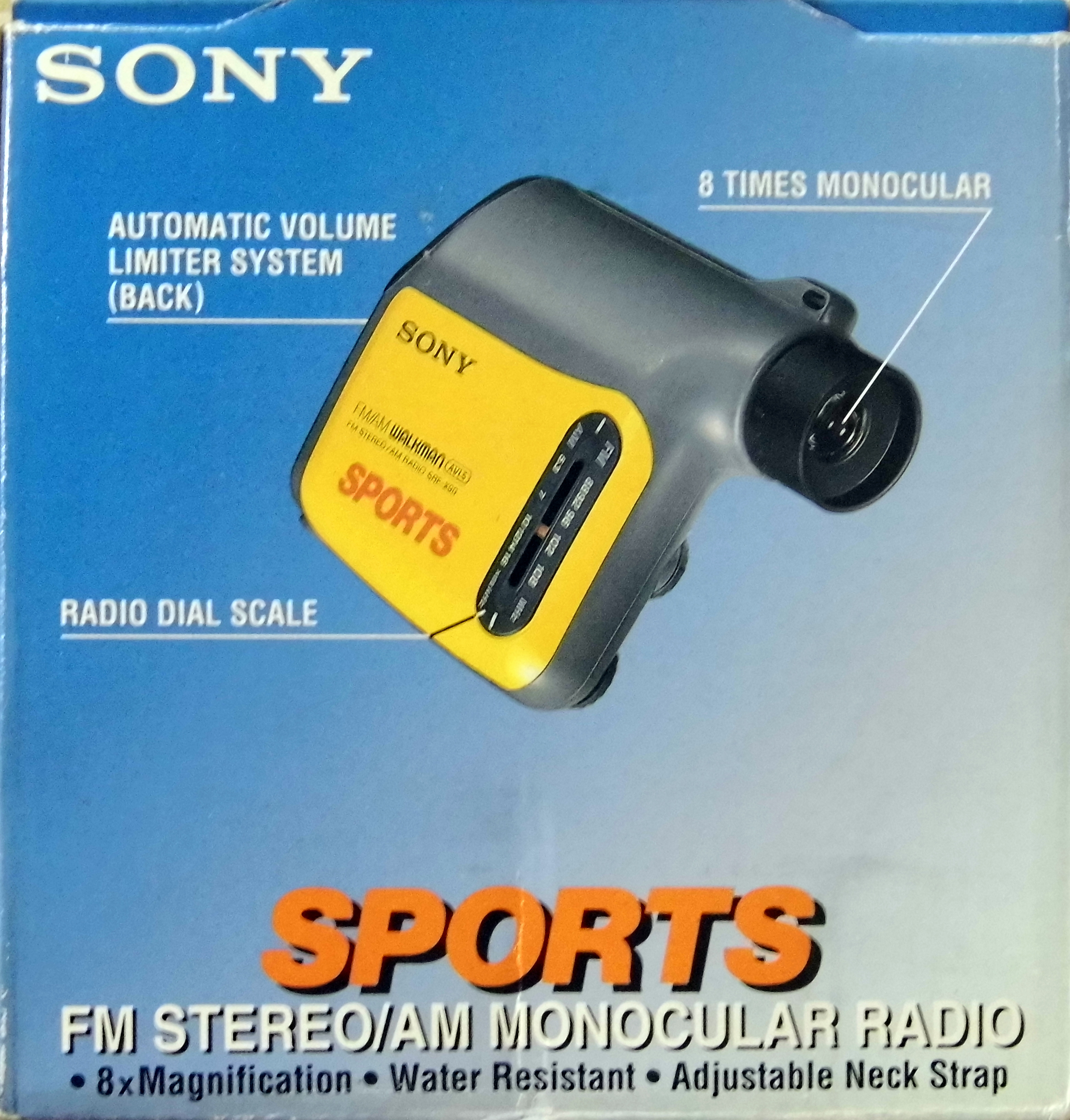
Sports Walkman FM Stereo/AM Monocular SRF-X90

== Discman, MiniDisc, and digital Walkman ==
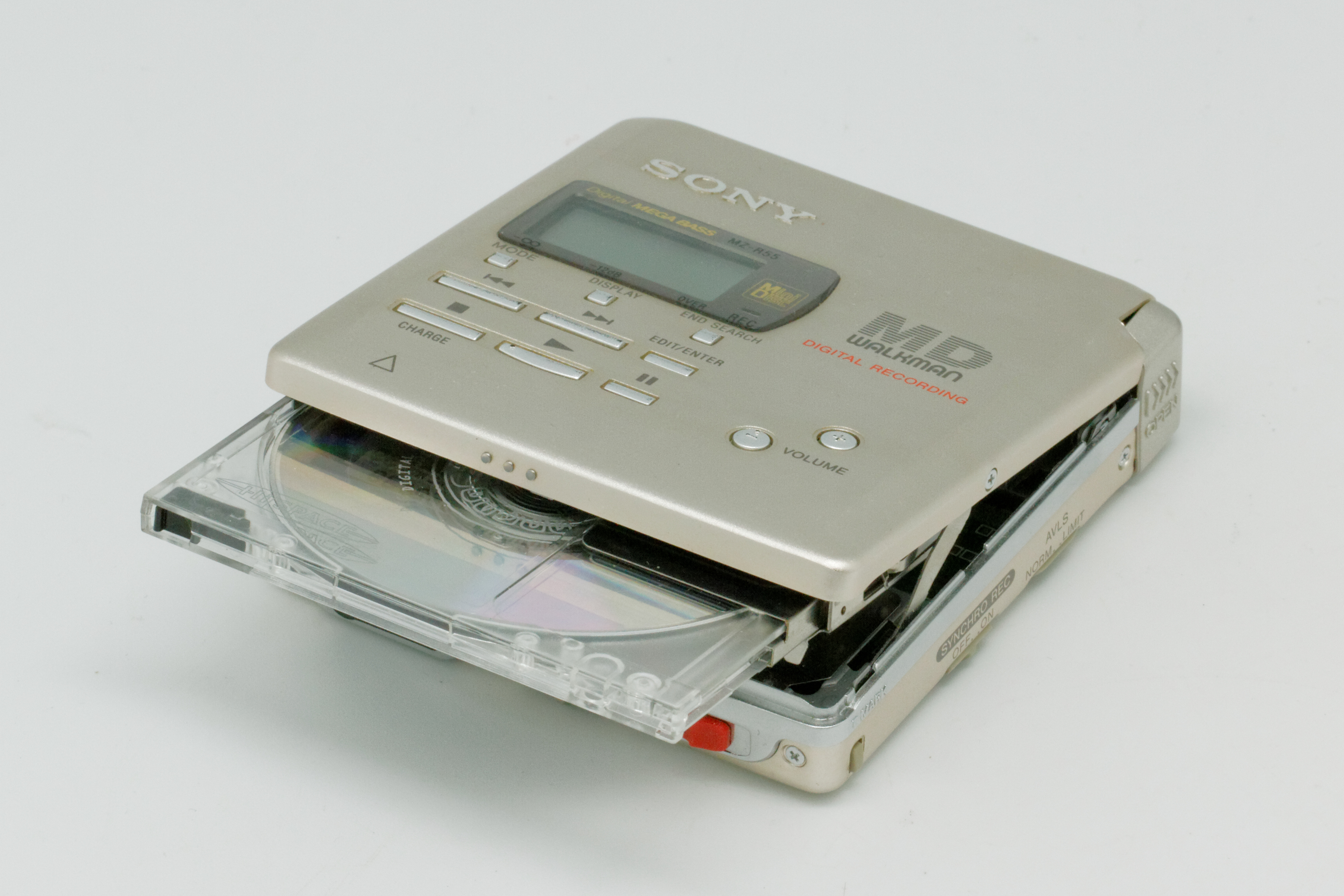
An MD (MiniDisc) Walkman player

After the success of the cassette Walkman, Sony extended the brand name to other portable non-cassette audio products: for example in 1990, Sony released Digital Audio Tape (DAT) players marketed as DAT Walkman, then in 1992 it launched the MD Walkman brand for portable MiniDisc players. Earlier, Sony also marketed the Discman line of portable compact disc (CD) players which started to rebrand as CD Walkman in 1997. Sony also used the name on other products, such as in 1989 when Sony released portable Video8 recorders marketed as Video Walkman.

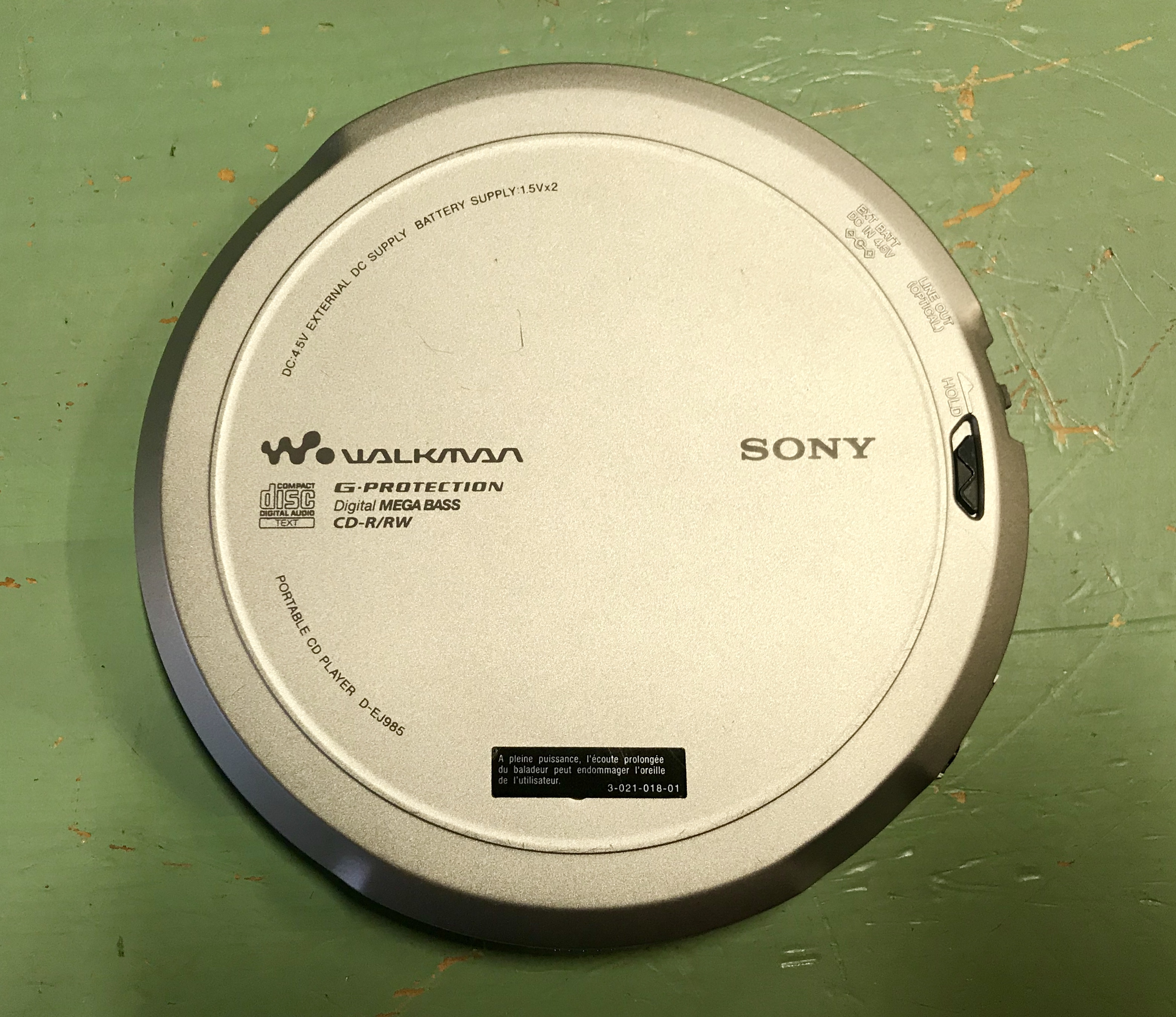
A Walkman portable CD player released in 2002, bearing the unified Walkman brand

With the decreasing relevance of cassette tapes, Sony unified the entire Walkman range of products into a single Walkman name and branding in the summer of 2000, and a new small W. icon was designed as part of the logo which remains in use to this day.

From 2012, Walkman was also the name of the music player software on Sony Xperia. It has since been rebranded to Music.

=== Digital players (1999–present) ===
On 21 December 1999, Sony launched its first ever digital audio players (DAP) under the name Network Walkman (the VAIO division also released a DAP at the same time). The first Walkman DAP used Memory Stick as its storage medium to store audio files in flash memory. It was branded as MS Walkman, shortly before the Walkman brand unification. Most future digital Walkman models would instead use built-in solid-state flash memory, although hard disk based players were also made from 2004 to 2007. Since 2005, all Walkman DAPs have been marketed as simply Walkman and thereby dropping the Network prefix that was previously used for this range.

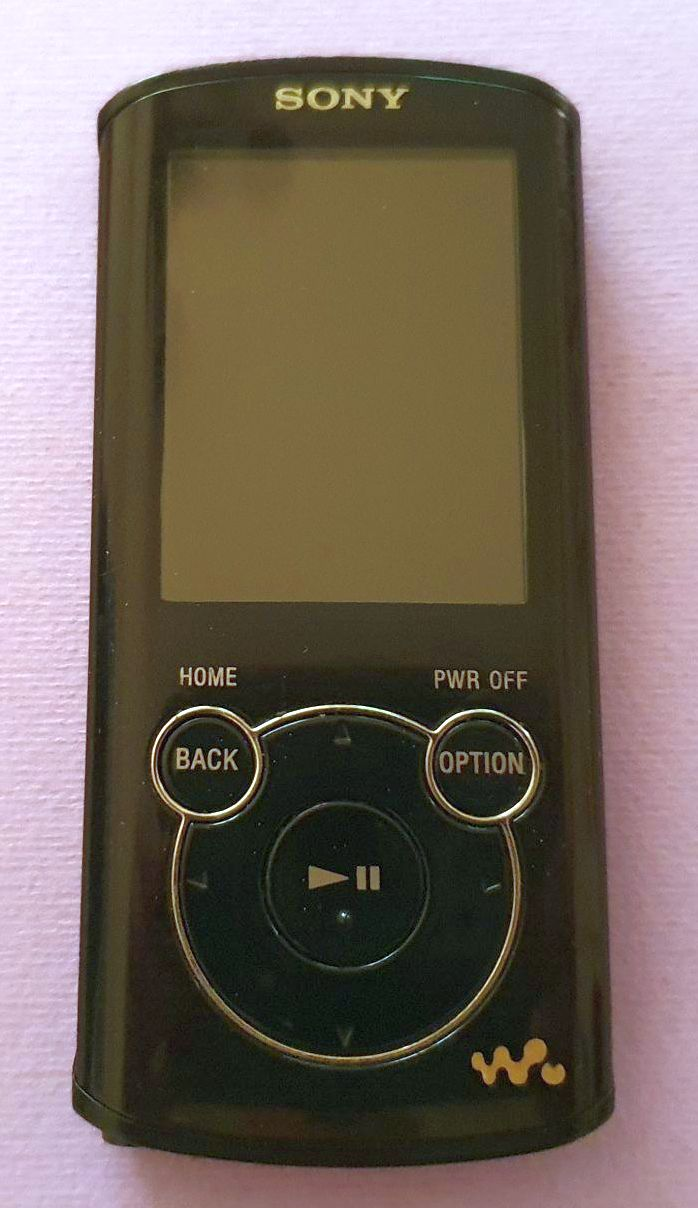
Walkman NWZ-E460 digital audio player, released in 2011

In its early years, the Walkmans came with OpenMG copyright protection and, until 2004, exclusively supported Sony's in-house ATRAC format; there was no support for industry-standard MP3 as Sony wanted to protect its records division, Sony BMG, from piracy. Additionally, Walkman-branded mobile phones were also made by the Sony Ericsson joint venture.

Sony could not repeat the success of the cassette player in the 21st-century digital audio player (DAP) market. Rival Apple's iPod range became a large success in the market, hindering Walkman sales internationally, though it fared better domestically. The Network Walkman for several years had paltry market share and had also been struggling against numerous other rivals such as Creative, Rio, Mpio and iRiver, although sales and share did eventually increase fivefold in 2005 and continued improving, but remained small. Its pricing policy, SonicStage software and lack of MP3 support in earlier years have been suggested factors of its performance. Its U.S. market share in 2006 was 1.9%, placing it behind Apple, SanDisk, Creative and Samsung. In Japan its share in 2009–2010 was between 43 and 48%, ahead of Apple for the first time.

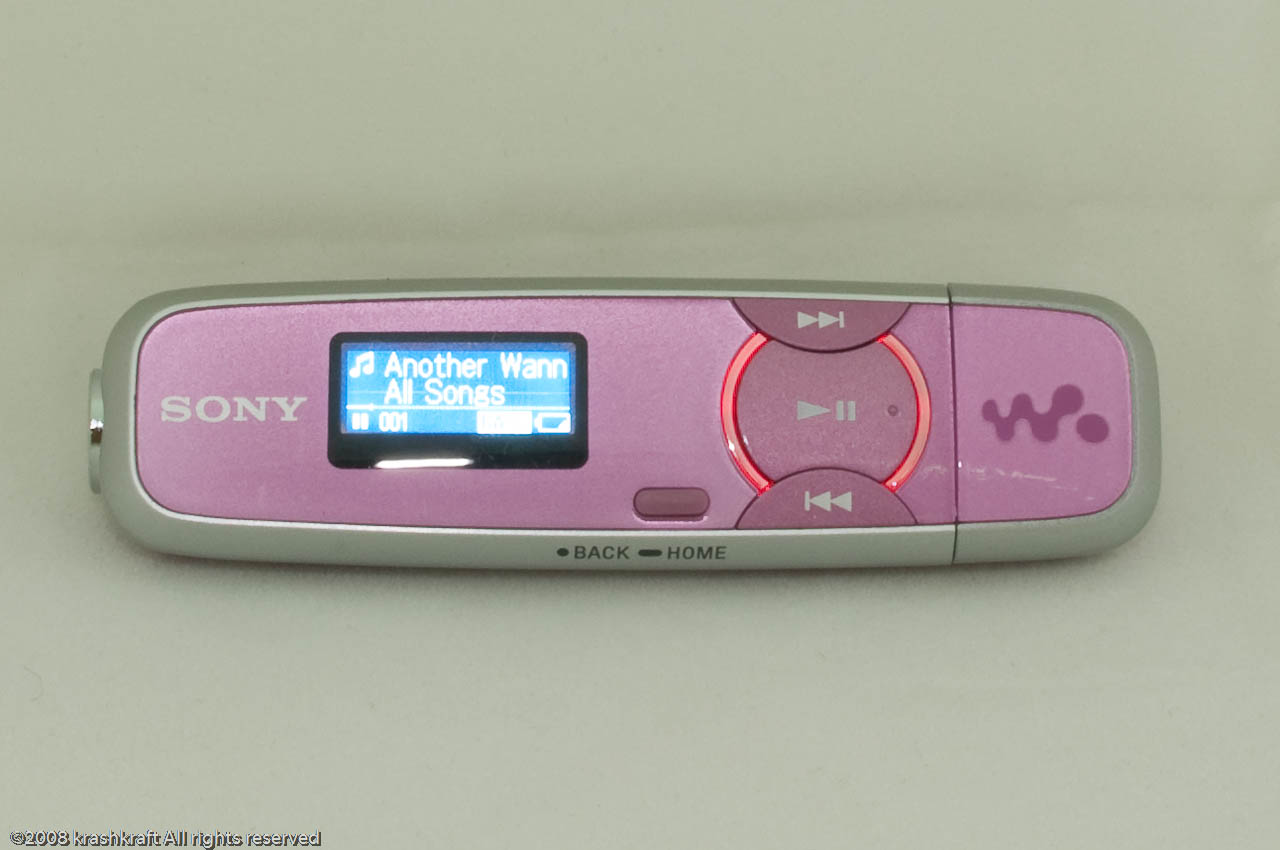
Sony Walkman NWZ-B135F thumb style digital audio player

Meanwhile, Sony Computer Entertainment, a Sony division who are not involved in Walkman products, officially described their PlayStation Portable (PSP) in 2004 as the "21st century Walkman". While the PSP was a handheld game console first, it was also seen as a modern day portable multimedia and entertainment system akin to the original Walkman.

Over the years, newer models of the digital Walkman included various new features. The first ever digital Walkman with a color display was the NW-A800 Series released in 2007 and it also provided, for the first time, video playback. The following year came the first with Bluetooth connectivity, and in 2009 the first touchscreen Walkman, the X1000. Beginning in late 2006 and lasting until 2019, most new Walkman players had a proprietary WM-PORT terminal which was used not only for charging and syncing but also for connecting to compatible docks. Other notable features of many Walkman players include the SensMe playlist technology, Karaoke Mode, Virtual Studio Technology (VST), and various proprietary sound enhancement technologies such as DSEE and ClearAudio. Players compatible with high-resolution audio have been released since 2013.

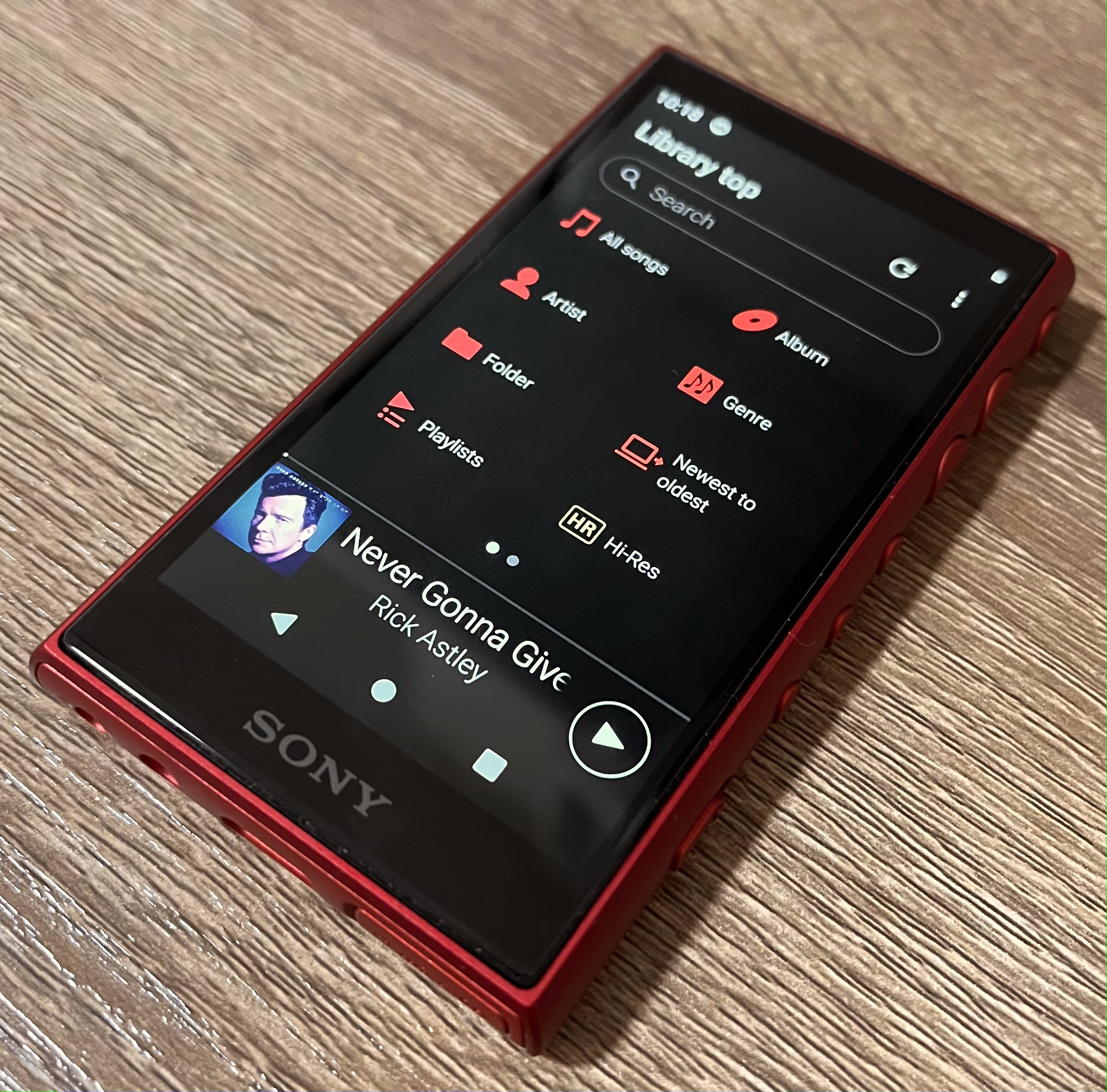
A newer A Series Walkman (NW-A105) running Android

With the shrinking market for purpose-made portable media players during the 2010s, Sony streamlined its Walkman line, marketing a narrower range of products and with an increased emphasis on high-end audiophilic players. This began with the launch of the ZX Series Walkman in 2013 and culminated in the luxurious WM1 Series first released in 2016, which is gold plated and retailed for several thousand US dollars. However outside the high-end space, and the mid-range A Series Walkman, as of 2025, Sony continue to market simple budget-oriented DAPs in the form of the E Series (NW-E390) and the thumb-style B Series (NWZ-B180) as well as the waterproof, sports-oriented WS Series.

== Marketing ==
The marketing of the original Walkman helped introduce the idea of "Japanese-ness" into global culture, synonymous with miniaturization and high-technology. The "Walk-men" and "Walk-women" in advertisements were created to be the ideal reflections of the viewing audience. Sony implemented a marketing strategy, hiring young adults to walk around in public wearing a Walkman, offering nearby people to test out the product. Sony also hired actors to pose with the Walkman around the streets of Tokyo as an additional form of promotion.

A major component of the Walkman advertising campaign was overspecialization of the device. Prior to the Walkman, the common device for portable music was the portable radio, which could only offer listeners standard music broadcasts. Having the ability to customize a playlist was a new feature in music consumption. Potential buyers had the opportunity to choose their match in terms of mobile listening technology. The ability to play one's personal choice of music and listen privately was a selling point of the Walkman, especially amongst teens, who contributed to its success. A diversity of features and styles suggested that there would be a product which was "the perfect choice" for each consumer. This method of marketing to an expansive user-base while maintaining the idea that the product was made for each individual took advantage of both mass marketing and personal differentiation.

In the early 2000s, Sony debuted Plato, a blue alien, as its mascot for the Walkman.

== Impact and legacy ==
Culturally the Walkman had a great effect and it became ubiquitous. According to Time, the Walkman's "unprecedented combination of portability (it ran on two AA batteries) and privacy (it featured a headphone jack but no external speaker) made it the ideal product for thousands of consumers looking for a compact portable stereo that they could take with them anywhere". According to The Verge, "the world changed" on the day the Walkman was released.

The Walkman became an icon in 1980s culture. In 1986, the word "Walkman" entered the Oxford English Dictionary. Millions used the Walkman during exercise, marking the beginning of the aerobics fad. Between 1987 and 1997, the height of the Walkman's popularity, the number of people who said they walked for exercise increased by 30%. Other firms, including Aiwa, Panasonic and Toshiba, produced similar products, and in 1983 cassettes outsold vinyl for the first time.

The Walkman has been cited as influencing people's relationship with music and technology, due to its "solitary" and "personal" nature, as users were listening to their music of choice instead of radio. It has been seen as a precursor of personal mainstream tech possessions such as personal computers or mobile phones. Headphones also started to be worn in public. This caused safety controversies in the US, which in 1982 led to the mayor of Woodbridge, New Jersey banning Walkman from being worn in public due to pedestrian accidents.

In the market, the Walkman's success also led to great adoption of the Compact Cassette format. Within a few years, cassettes were outselling vinyl records, and would continue to do so until the compact disc (CD) overtook cassette sales in 1991.

In German-speaking countries, the use of "Walkman" became generic, meaning a personal stereo of any make, to a degree that the Austrian Supreme Court of Justice ruled in 2002 that Sony could not prevent others from using the term "Walkman" to describe similar goods. It is therefore an example of what marketing experts call the "genericide" of a brand.

A large statue of a Sports Walkman FM was erected in Tokyo's Ginza district in 2019 in celebration of the 40th anniversary.

In 2025, a cassette Walkman from 1979 (model TPS-L2 ) was included in Pirouette: Turning Points in Design, an exhibition at the Museum of Modern Art featuring "widely recognized design icons [...] highlighting pivotal moments in design history."

== Current range ==
Below here is a timeline of recent Walkman models:

Timeline of Walkman models (2014–present)

Walkman portable digital audio and media players are the only Walkman-branded products still being produced today, although the "Network" prefix is no longer used, the model numbers still carry the "NW-" prefix. The current product range as of 2024 are:

- A Series – mid-range players
- B Series (except Japan) – budget-oriented thumb style music players
- E Series – entry level players
- S Series (Japan) – entry level players
- W/WS Series – wearable music players
- WM1 Series – flagship luxurious high-end players (part of Sony's Signature Series of audio products)
- ZX Series – high-end music players

Since 2017, Sony provided the Music Center for PC software on Microsoft Windows, designed for both content transfer and also playback for Walkman and other audio products.

== See also ==
- Discman
- List of Sony Walkman products
- PlayStation Portable (PSP)
- Sony Watchman
- Stereobelt
- Walkman effect
