= Walkman effect =

Autonomy granted through headphones

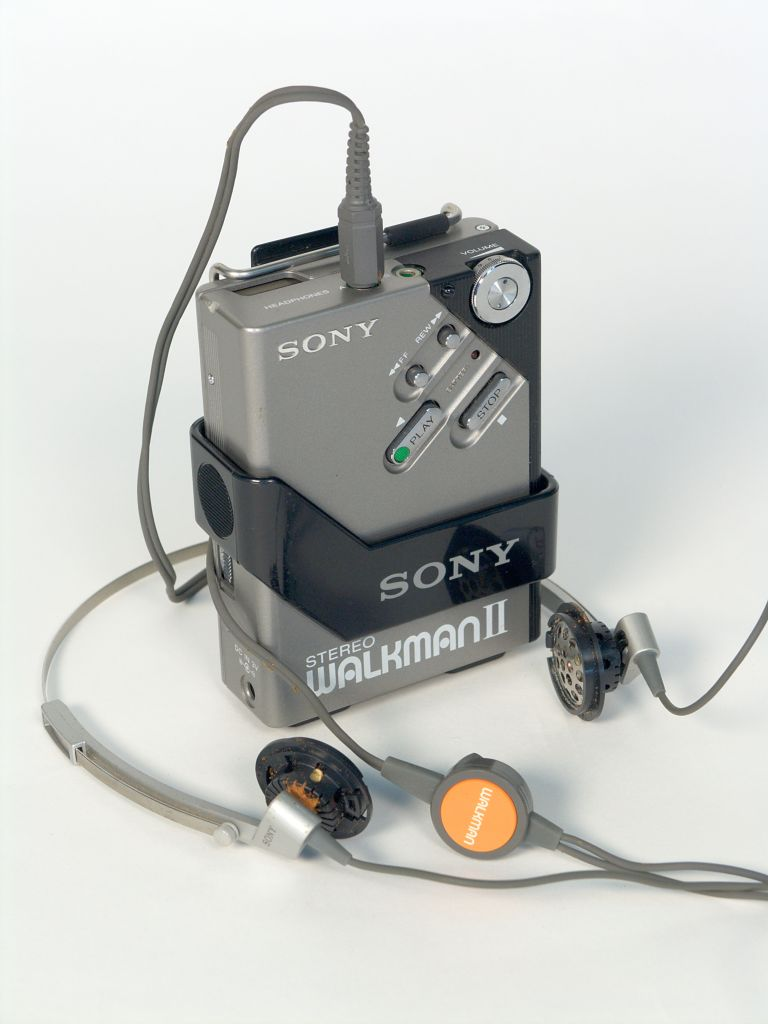
Walkman II player from 1982

The Walkman effect is the way music listened to via headphones grants the listener more control over their environment. The term was coined by Shuhei Hosokawa, a professor at the International Research Center for Japanese Studies, in an article published in Popular Music in 1984. While the term was named after the dominant portable music technology of the time, the Sony Walkman, it generically applies to all portable headphone-capable devices. It has been cited numerous times to refer to similar products released later, such as portable media players (including the Apple iPod), smartphones with Bluetooth headphones, etc.

== History ==
When Sony released the first Walkmans, they featured two headphone jacks and a "hotline" switch. When pressed, this button activated a microphone and lowered the volume to enable those listening to have a conversation without removing their headphones. Sony Chairman Akio Morita added these features to the design for fear the technology would be isolating. Although Morita "thought it would be considered rude for one person to be listening to his music in isolation", people bought their own units rather than share, and these features were removed for later models.

== Autonomy ==
The initial Walkman marketing campaign showcased the freedom it brought. The first presentation to the press involved young people riding bikes and skateboarding while listening to Walkmans. Hosokawa points to this ability to listen to music and do something else as making those experiences more pleasurable. The Walkman, he says, is the "autonomy-of-the-walking-self".

Sony's vice president in charge of audio products said that Walkman's achievement was that it "provided listeners with a personal soundtrack to their lives", allowing its users "to make even the most boring daily activities interesting, adding a bit of personal style to everything they do".

University of Sussex Professor Michael Bull (aka "Professor iPod") argues that a personal stereo changes the way its user processes the world, allowing for greater confidence and control over personal experiences in space and time. From an interview in Wired: "People like to control their environment, and the iPod is the perfect way to manage your experience. Music is the most powerful medium for thought, mood and movement control."

== Urban strategy ==
The appeal of personal experience management seems to be strongest in cities. As Hosokawa puts it, "To think about [the Walkman effect] is to reflect on the urban itself: [W]alkman as urban strategy, as urban sonic/musical device."

One specific effect noted by both Patton and Bull is what Bull calls "auditized looking", the ability of those listening to a personal stereo to make or escape eye contact with others in ways they would not otherwise. Traditional messages carried by eye contact are, to some extent, dissolved by the music's protective bubble, with the listener seen as unavailable.

== Headphones, isolation, and perceived rudeness ==
Like other devices such as smartphones and handheld video game consoles, the Walkman has attracted criticism for promoting anti-social behavior. It has been accused of socially isolating its listeners, promoting narcissism, and enabling rudeness. Since listening to music over headphones can attenuate or mask background noise, it can effectively prevent interactions that are the basis for traditional place-based communities, such as partaking in conversations or passively listening for others in one's vicinity.

In his phenomenological analysis of this effect, Rainer Schönhammer argues that wearing headphones interrupts a form of contact between people in a shared situation, even if there is no explicit communication, thereby violating "an unwritten law of interpersonal reciprocity: the certainty of common sensual presence in shared situations". He goes on to draw a similarity with the wearing of dark sunglasses, which irritates because there is an inequality in the balance of looking at and being looked at.

Similarly, according to Hosokawa, Walkman users blatantly "confess" that they have a secret (something that you can not hear), which can cause negative feelings in observers.

Both writers, however, make an effort to counter negative accusations of detachment, isolation, and narcissism. Perhaps most importantly, Walkman listeners are generally happier, more confident, and calmer. The users are "unified in the autonomous and singular moment—neither as persons nor as individuals—with the real", when "absence does not mean that the world is no longer worth attention. On the contrary, the subject's disengagement sets him free to enjoy the world attentively as a colorful and rich spectacle."

== See also ==
- Networked individualism
- Space of flows
- Pirouette: Turning Points in Design – 2025 exhibition at the Museum of Modern Art
