= Walkman E Series =

Series of portable media players

Walkman logo

The Walkman E Series is a line of digital audio (DAP) and portable media (PMP) players, marketed by Sony as part of its Walkman range. E Series devices have been marketed since 2000, although in its current form since 2008 as entry-level, candybar styled players.

== History ==
Former logo of the E Series in Japan

=== 2000–2004 ===
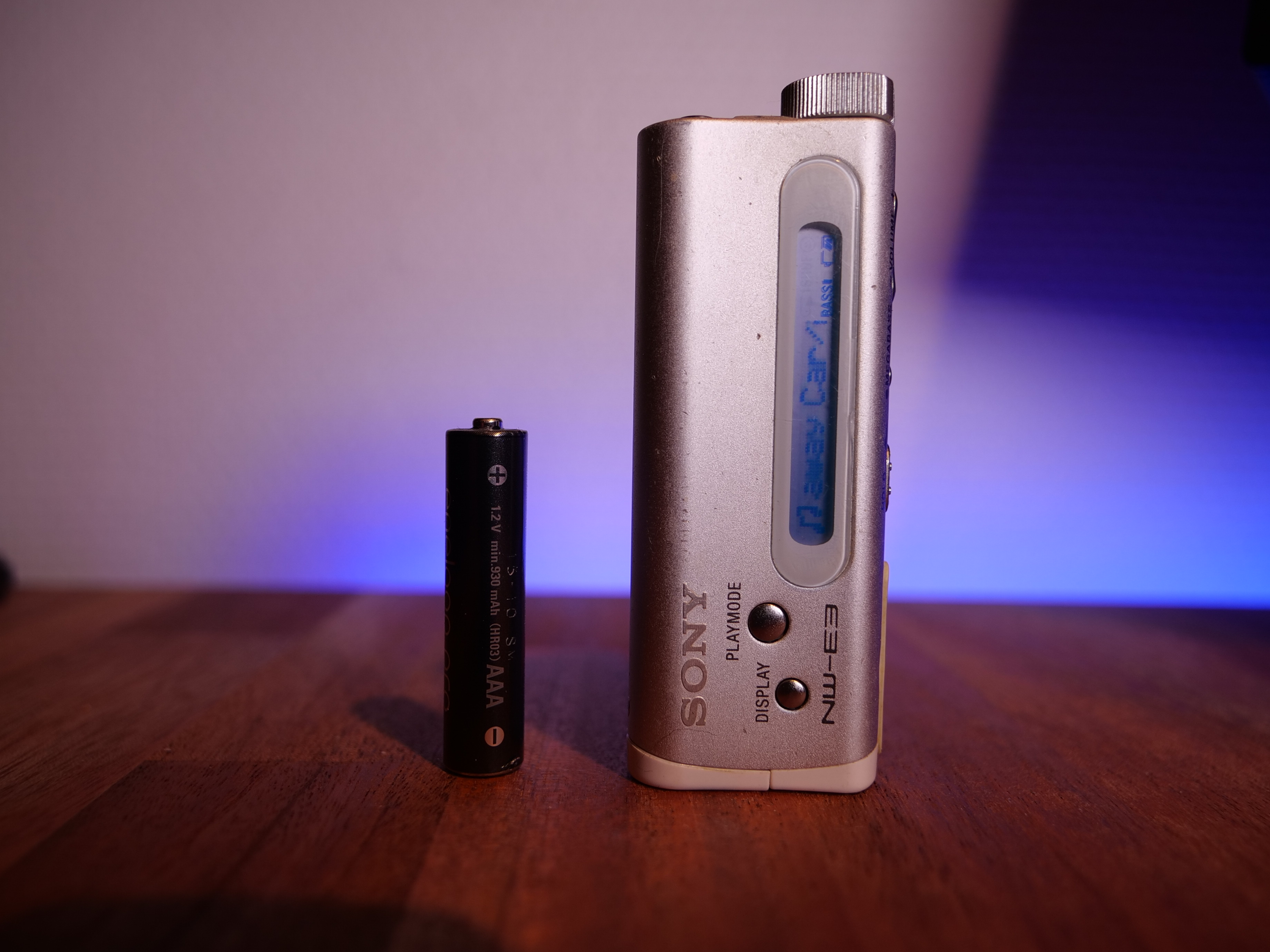
The first Walkman digital player with an E prefix: the NW-E3, shown here with an AAA battery for scale

The E series started in 2000 as the second memory based Walkman music player after the Memory Stick based NW-MS7. The first generation players came with 96 MB (NW-E5), 64 MB (NW-E3) or 32 MB (NW-E2) embedded flash memory. The player looked like a cigarette lighter and was deemed "ultra compact and light", weighing 45 grams. The NW-E3 was released in Japan on June 10, 2000 as the very first "Network Walkman", and from 2001 elsewhere. The larger capacity NW-E5 was released in Japan in December 2000. These players continue the use of OpenMG software like the Memory Stick Walkman.

The second generation NW-E7 and NW-E10 models were announced in September 2001 and first released in Japan in October 2001. The NW-E10 has 128 MB memory, with cited storage for 240 minutes of ATRAC playback. It was the earliest Network Walkman to support the MP3 format.

In 2004 models NW-E75 (256 MB) and NW-E55 (128 MB) were released. These have an acrylic finish and come in either silver (NW-E75) or either blue, red or pearl (NW-E55). These players don't support MP3.

The NW-E99 and NW-E95 were introduced in October 2004, with 1 GB and 512 MB internal memory respectively. They had native MP3 support.

=== 2005–2008 ===
The NW-E100 series, also marketed as the Walkman Circ, was released in March 2005 which has a circular design. The player comes in 1 GB (NW-E107), 512 MB (NW-E105) and 256 MB (NW-E103) capacities and was available in several colors. Rated battery life was up to 70 hours playback. It was designed to take on Apple's iPod Shuffle.

==== E500/E400 Series ====
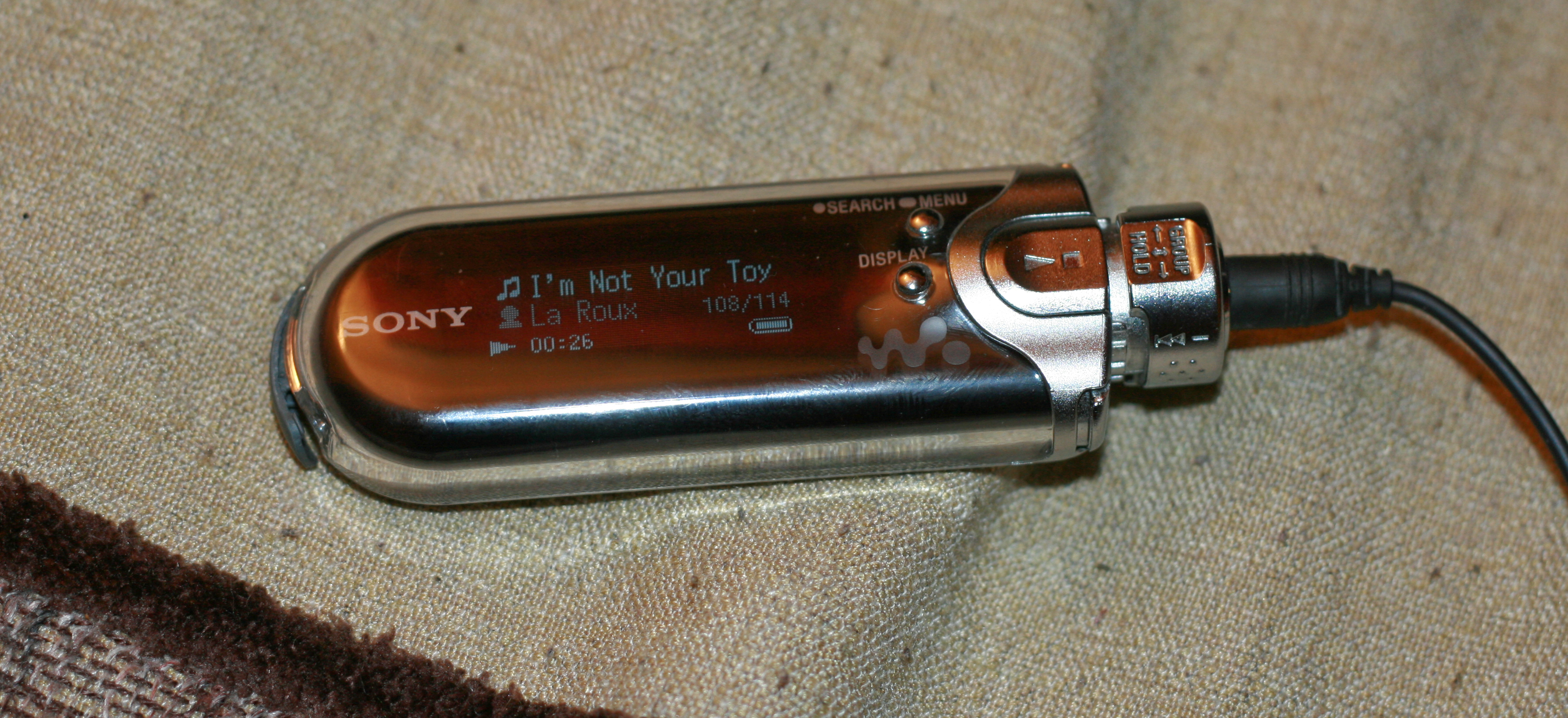
NW-E400 series (2005)

Shortly afterwards the NW-E500 and NW-E400 series were introduced, also marketed as the Walkman Core ( Nicknamed Walkman Stick ), with capacities ranging from 256 MB to 1 GB. These are USB thumb drive styled with an electroluminescence display with 36 x 120 resolution. The players supported MP3 , Atrac3 and Atrac3plus music formats. The two are the same except that NW-E500 has an FM radio tuner. Sony said these were modeled after glass perfume bottles. These feature a multifunctional knob controller (the trademarked "Jog Dial") used for navigating similar to some of the earlier E Series and MiniDisc Walkman. The dial has three states: HOLD, song mode, and music grouping. Sony also claimed it has a "superquick battery charge" giving 3 hours of battery life by charging for 3 minutes. This feature was carried over to various other Walkman players afterwards. This model also received a firmware 2 update that enabled the player to have extra screensavers like the official Sony made ones named 'Stardust' and 'Aquarium'.

==== E300/E200 Series ====
The NW-E300/E200 series, nicknamed and also marketed as the Walkman Bean, was released in October 2005, and production ceased in April 2006. The name refers to its shape, which was modelled after a jellybean. The Walkman Bean featured a 'pop-out' USB port for file transfer. One of its major selling points was the battery's fast charge speed, with Sony stating that a 3-minute charge would give 3 hours of playback. Sony claimed that a fully charged Bean playing Sony's own compressed audio format, ATRAC, can operate for 50 hours, or 40 hours for audio compressed as MP3.

The player was available in three versions: the basic model with 512 MB capacity (model NW-E205), the basic model with an inbuilt FM radio (model NW-E305), and a higher-capacity 1 GB model (model NW-E307). It was also available in four colours, named after jellybean flavours - Tropical Ice (blue), Cotton Candy (pink), Licorice (black) and Coconut (white). The Bean didn't last long with low sales accompanied with poor ergonomics.

==== E000 Series ====
In August 2006 Sony released the NW-E000 series, filled with 512 MB, 1 GB or 2 GB of flash-memory. Very compact, this Walkman offered a battery life of up to 28 hours. It had a built-in USB key for easy file transfer. The battery charge/recharge was through USB connection. It was also equipped with a 1 line OLED display for navigation. It no longer has a dial but instead has normal buttons.

The series supported multiple audio codecs, including ATRAC (ATRAC3 at 66, 105, and 132 kbit/s; ATRAC3plus at 48, 64, and 256 kbit/s), MP3, WMA, and later AAC. Officially, music management and track transfers required Sony's SonicStage 3.4 software. Standard drag-and-drop file copying was impeded by a strict hardware-bound DRM implementation: the Walkman's internal DSP required audio frames to be XOR-scrambled against a 32-bit hardware key permanently embedded in the device's ASIC. Bypassing this encryption caused the player to halt playback with a "CANNOT PLAY" error. To properly authorize files, host software was required to extract this key by querying the hardware with vendor-specific SCSI commands multiplexed over standard USB Bulk-Only Transport.

To circumvent the reliance on SonicStage, the community developed cross-platform free software alternatives that implemented this necessary cryptographic scaffolding. The earliest of these was NW-E00X MP3 File Manager, which evolved into Symphonic, JSymphonic, and its modern fork, JSymphonic Revival Edition. These tools enable seamless file synchronization across Linux, macOS, and Windows without relying on proprietary utilities.

==== E010 Series ====
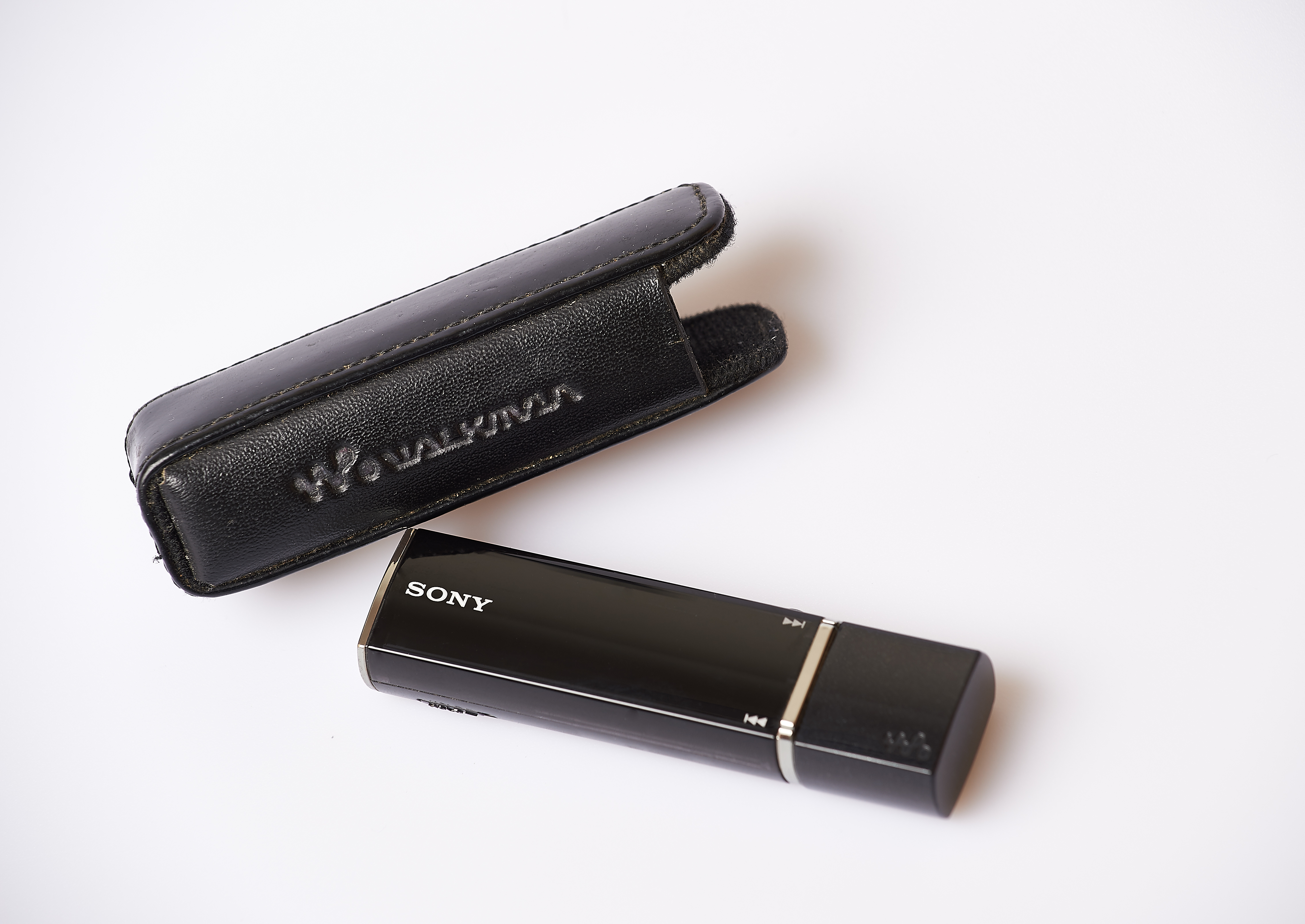
NW-E013 (2007)

In March 2007, Asia, Australia, New Zealand, some countries of Europe and Canada had the Walkman NW-E010 series (NW-E013, NW-E015 and NW-E016) a small USB flash player. Weighing only 23 g, the NW-E010 was available in capacities from 1 to 4 GB and came in five colors: pink, violet, teal, black, and gold. Its features included a rechargeable lithium-ion battery, built-in FM tuner, a three-line color LCD display, calendar and time function, and Clear Stereo and Clear Bass technologies to enhance the audio quality.

==== E020 Series ====
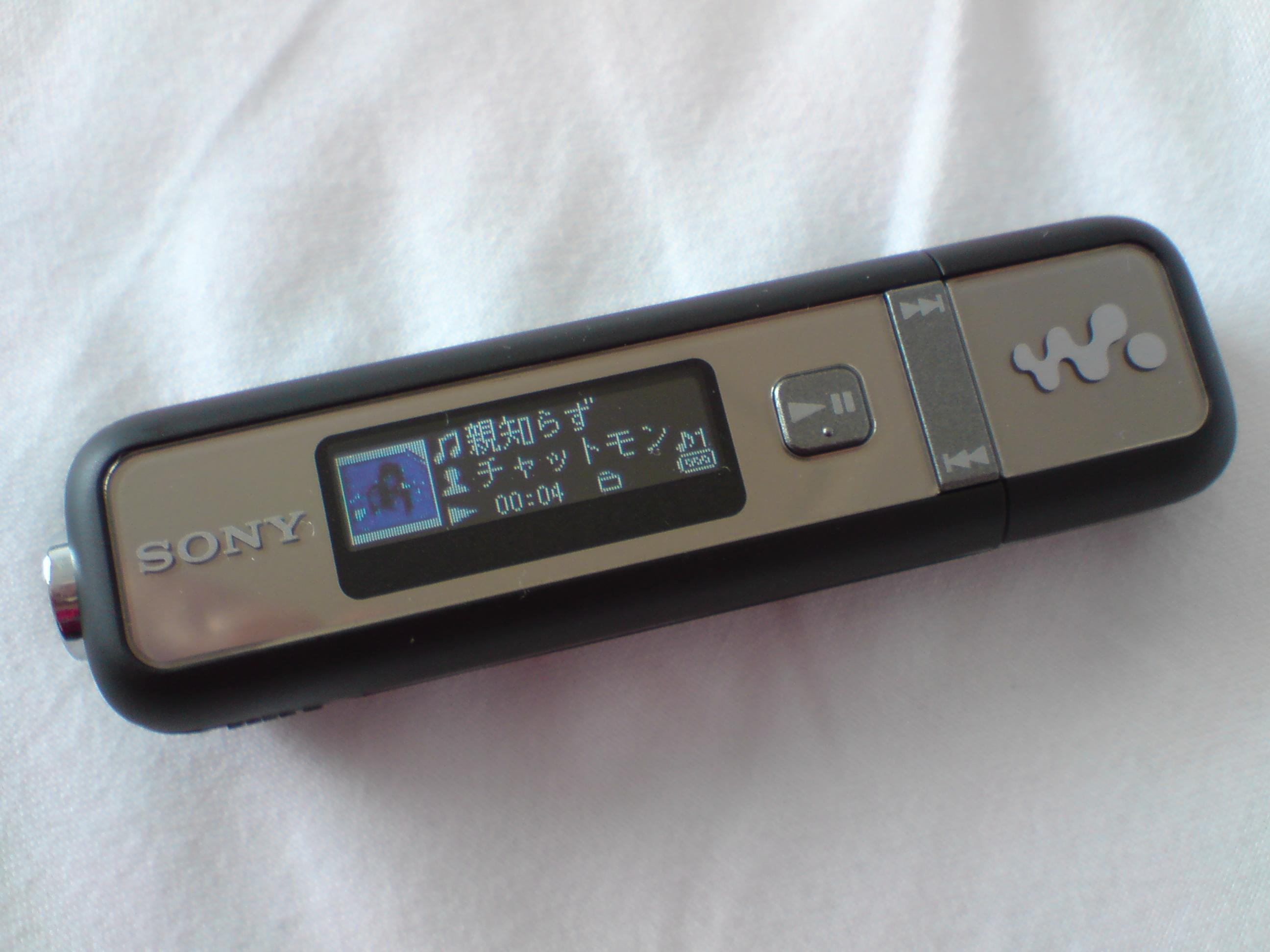
NW-E020 series

The NW-E020 series were released in Japan in March 2008. The memory sizes were 1 GB for the NW-E023, 2 GB for the NW-E025, and 4 GB for the NW-E026. Each size was available in a five color assortment: white, pink, green, red, and black. The faces of the players were designed for admit changeable color and design templates. The supplied earbuds were the MDR-EX82 earphones in white for the white, pink, and green player and black for the red and black player.

These could play ATRAC, PCM, WMA, MP3, and AAC, (DRM'ed WMA and AAC couldn't be played). As in older models, the connector was the standard male USB. The screen was LCD and displayed three lines along with an optional album-jacket function. It had a five-band equalizer and Sony's "clear stereo" which means pre-set EQ function. They had a built-in Li-Ion cell which had a quick-charge for approximately three hours playback from a 3-minute plug-in and a complete charge takes about one hour. Sony mentioned the capability of FM reception, (Japan band of 76 to 90 MHz), usually devices with an F at the end of the model number.

=== 2008–present ===
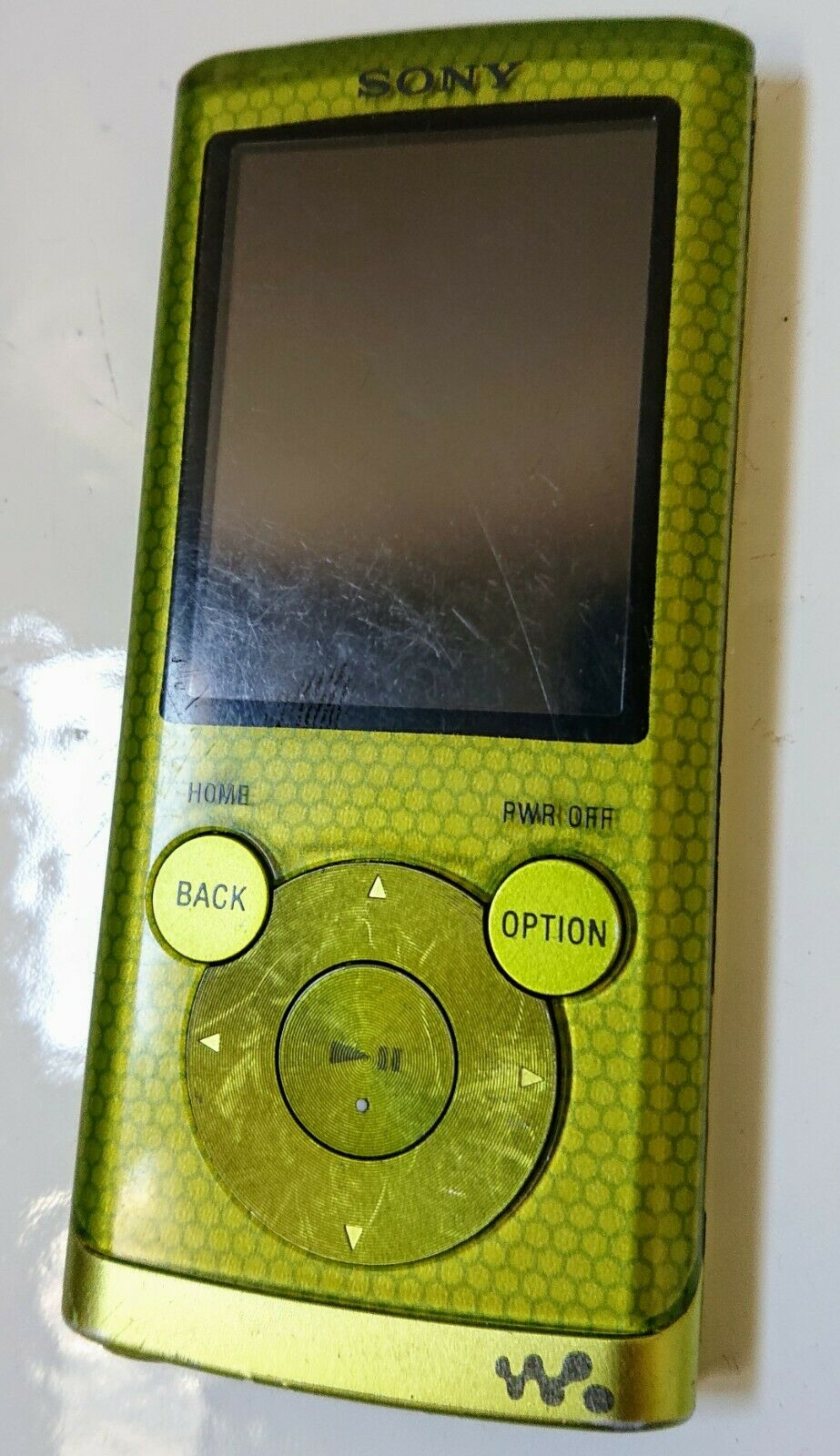
NWZ-E453 (2010)

In 2008 the previously "gumstick" style E Series was repurposed into a new line of entry-level, slim and colorful portable media players ("gumstick" style E Series players briefly continued in Japan, and internationally as the B Series). The E430 Series was launched in 2008 with a 2-inch colour display and video playing capabilities. Its 2009 successor, the E440 series, featured a 2-inch QVGA color display and was 9.3mm thick. From this point on, cheaper variants would be made under the E3xx range, starting with the E340 series, which remove a few features from the E4xx range of players and have USB ports instead of proprietary WM-PORT.

Its successor, E450 series, was introduced in July 2010. This player was the first featuring Karaoke Mode, a new function that reduces lead vocals in a song. It also featured (for the first time on a Walkman outside Japan) scrolling lyrics using an LRC file. The player came in black, red, blue, pink or green. A smaller sized, low cost E Series player without video capability, the E050, was released in Japan in 2010 and in 2011 in Singapore, Mexico and Eastern Europe.

This was followed by E460 in 2011 with a 50 hour battery life (same as E450 series). The E470 was introduced in 2012 and for the first time featured games - it comes preloaded with Puyo Pop Fever and Number Place (sudoku). In 2013 the E580 series was launched which adds support for lossless FLAC audio. By now the product range had split entirely into the E3xx and E5xx range, and starting with the E360 series the E3xx range became more distinct, adopting a reduced size and the pre-2010 user interface and omitting several features found in the E5xx players. In Japan, the E Series slowly faded at the budget end by the Walkman S Series.

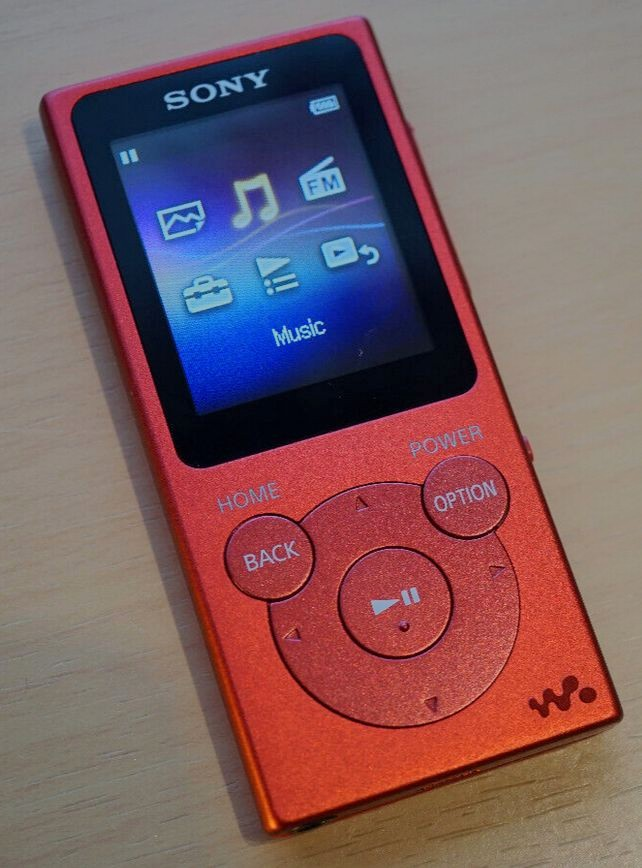
NW-E394 in red

The latest entry, the NW-E390 series, was released in 2016, with a new rectangle design over the E380 series. It comes in variants of 16 GB (E395), 8 GB (E394) and 4 GB (E393). The E390 is currently the only series in production as there has been no successor to the E580 in the E5xx range.

== Specifications and comparison ==
Base models are the E4xx range. The E3xx range removes some features from E4xx equivalents. The E5xx range adds some features from the E4xx equivalents.

Series (NW*-)	Image	Model	Capacity	Release date (may differ by region or model)	Display	Rated battery life (hours)	Data/power connection (input/output)	Supported audio formats	FM radio	Physical size	Weight
E2 E3 E5		NW-E2	32 MB	June 10, 2000	1-line LCD	5 (on one AAA battery)	42-pin / USB	ATRAC	✗	81 mm 32 mm 14.6 mm	45 g (1.6 oz)
E2 E3 E5		NW-E3	64 MB	June 10, 2000	1-line LCD	5 (on one AAA battery)	42-pin / USB	ATRAC	✗	81 mm 32 mm 14.6 mm	45 g (1.6 oz)
E2 E3 E5		NW-E5	96 MB	June 10, 2000	1-line LCD	5 (on one AAA battery)	42-pin / USB	ATRAC	✗	81 mm 32 mm 14.6 mm	45 g (1.6 oz)
E2 E3 E5		The second Network Walkman player following the NW-MS7.									
E8		NW-E8P	64 MB	April 21, 2001	LCD	7 (on one AAA battery)	Mini-B USB / USB	ATRAC	✗		90 g (3.2 oz)
E8		Headphone shaped wearable player.									
E7 E10		NW-E7	64 MB	October 21, 2001	Round	11 hours	DC / AC (using supplied cradle)	ATRAC, MP3	✗	92.4 mm 30.9 mm 14.7 mm	55 g (1.9 oz)
E7 E10		NW-E10	128 MB	October 21, 2001	Round	11 hours	DC / AC (using supplied cradle)	ATRAC, MP3	✗	92.4 mm 30.9 mm 14.7 mm	55 g (1.9 oz)
E7 E10		Rechargeable battery and MP3 support.									
E55-E95		NW-E55	128 MB	July 2004	1-line LCD	Up to 70 (on one AAA battery)	Mini-B USB / USB	ATRAC	✗	56 mm 37.3 mm 15 mm	55 g (1.41 oz)
E55-E95		NW-E73	128 MB	July 2004	1-line LCD	Up to 70 (on one AAA battery)	Mini-B USB / USB	ATRAC	✗	56 mm 37.3 mm 15 mm	55 g (1.41 oz)
E55-E95		NW-E75	256 MB	July 2004	1-line LCD	Up to 70 (on one AAA battery)	Mini-B USB / USB	ATRAC	✗	56 mm 37.3 mm 15 mm	55 g (1.41 oz)
E55-E95		NW-E95	512 MB	December 10, 2004	1-line LCD	Up to 70 (on one AAA battery)	Mini-B USB / USB	ATRAC, MP3	✗	56 mm 37.3 mm 15 mm	55 g (1.41 oz)
E55-E95		NW-E99	1 GB	December 10, 2004	1-line LCD	Up to 70 (on one AAA battery)	Mini-B USB / USB	ATRAC, MP3	✗	56 mm 37.3 mm 15 mm	55 g (1.41 oz)
E55-E95		NW-E95 and NW-E99 have MP3 support.									
E100 (Circ)		NW-E103	256 MB	March 21, 2005	1-line LCD	60-70	Mini-B USB / USB	ATRAC, MP3	✗	56.2 mm 56.2 mm 19.2 mm	26 g (0.92 oz)
E100 (Circ)		NW-E105	512 MB	March 21, 2005	1-line LCD	60-70	Mini-B USB / USB	ATRAC, MP3	✗	56.2 mm 56.2 mm 19.2 mm	26 g (0.92 oz)
E100 (Circ)		NW-E107	1 GB	March 21, 2005	1-line LCD	60-70	Mini-B USB / USB	ATRAC, MP3	✗	56.2 mm 56.2 mm 19.2 mm	26 g (0.92 oz)
E100 (Circ)		Rechargeable battery.									
E500 / E400 (Core)		NW-E403	256 MB	April 21, 2005	3-line OLED	45-50	Mini-B USB / USB	ATRAC, MP3	✗	28.8 mm 84.9 mm 13.9 mm	55 g (1.66 oz)
E500 / E400 (Core)		NW-E405	512 MB	April 21, 2005	3-line OLED	45-50	Mini-B USB / USB	ATRAC, MP3	✗	28.8 mm 84.9 mm 13.9 mm	55 g (1.66 oz)
E500 / E400 (Core)		NW-E407	1 GB	April 21, 2005	3-line OLED	45-50	Mini-B USB / USB	ATRAC, MP3	✗	28.8 mm 84.9 mm 13.9 mm	55 g (1.66 oz)
E500 / E400 (Core)		NW-E503	256 MB	April 21, 2005	3-line OLED	45-50	Mini-B USB / USB	ATRAC, MP3	✓	28.8 mm 84.9 mm 13.9 mm	55 g (1.66 oz)
E500 / E400 (Core)		NW-E505	512 MB	April 21, 2005	3-line OLED	45-50	Mini-B USB / USB	ATRAC, MP3	✓	28.8 mm 84.9 mm 13.9 mm	55 g (1.66 oz)
E500 / E400 (Core)		NW-E507	1 GB	April 21, 2005	3-line OLED	45-50	Mini-B USB / USB	ATRAC, MP3	✓	28.8 mm 84.9 mm 13.9 mm	55 g (1.66 oz)
E500 / E400 (Core)		E500 adds an FM radio tuner over the E400.									
E300 / E200 (Bean)		NW-E205	512 MB	October 26, 2005	1-line OLED	50	USB (output terminal)	ATRAC, MP3	✗	68.2 mm 24.1 mm 39 mm	45 g (1.6 oz)
E300 / E200 (Bean)		NW-E207	1 GB	October 26, 2005	1-line OLED	50	USB (output terminal)	ATRAC, MP3	✗	68.2 mm 24.1 mm 39 mm	45 g (1.6 oz)
E300 / E200 (Bean)		NW-E303	256 MB	October 26, 2005	1-line OLED	50	USB (output terminal)	ATRAC, MP3	✓	68.2 mm 24.1 mm 39 mm	45 g (1.6 oz)
E300 / E200 (Bean)		NW-E305	512 MB	October 26, 2005	1-line OLED	50	USB (output terminal)	ATRAC, MP3	✓	68.2 mm 24.1 mm 39 mm	45 g (1.6 oz)
E300 / E200 (Bean)		NW-E307	1 GB	October 26, 2005	1-line OLED	50	USB (output terminal)	ATRAC, MP3	✓	68.2 mm 24.1 mm 39 mm	45 g (1.6 oz)
E300 / E200 (Bean)		E300 adds an FM radio tuner over the E200.									
E000		NW-E002	512 MB	June 10, 2006	1-line OLED	28	USB (output terminal)	ATRAC, MP3, WMA	✗	79 mm 24.6 mm 13.6 mm	25 g (0.88 oz)
E000		NW-E002F	512 MB	June 10, 2006	1-line OLED	28	USB (output terminal)	ATRAC, MP3, WMA	✓	79 mm 24.6 mm 13.6 mm	25 g (0.88 oz)
E000		NW-E003	1 GB	June 10, 2006	1-line OLED	28	USB (output terminal)	ATRAC, MP3, WMA	✗	79 mm 24.6 mm 13.6 mm	25 g (0.88 oz)
E000		NW-E003F	1 GB	June 10, 2006	1-line OLED	28	USB (output terminal)	ATRAC, MP3, WMA	✓	79 mm 24.6 mm 13.6 mm	25 g (0.88 oz)
E000		NW-E005	2 GB	June 10, 2006	1-line OLED	28	USB (output terminal)	ATRAC, MP3, WMA	✗	79 mm 24.6 mm 13.6 mm	25 g (0.88 oz)
E000		NW-E005F	2 GB	June 10, 2006	1-line OLED	28	USB (output terminal)	ATRAC, MP3, WMA	✓	79 mm 24.6 mm 13.6 mm	25 g (0.88 oz)
E010		NW-E013	1 GB	April 21, 2007	3-line LCD colour	28-30	USB (output terminal)	ATRAC, MP3, WMA, AAC	✗	22.8 mm 83.1 mm 14.2 mm	29 g (1.02 oz)
E010		NW-E013F	1 GB	April 21, 2007	3-line LCD colour	28-30	USB (output terminal)	ATRAC, MP3, WMA, AAC	✓	22.8 mm 83.1 mm 14.2 mm	29 g (1.02 oz)
E010		NW-E015	2 GB	April 21, 2007	3-line LCD colour	28-30	USB (output terminal)	ATRAC, MP3, WMA, AAC	✗	22.8 mm 83.1 mm 14.2 mm	29 g (1.02 oz)
E010		NW-E015F	2 GB	April 21, 2007	3-line LCD colour	28-30	USB (output terminal)	ATRAC, MP3, WMA, AAC	✓	22.8 mm 83.1 mm 14.2 mm	29 g (1.02 oz)
E010		NW-E016	4 GB	April 21, 2007	3-line LCD colour	28-30	USB (output terminal)	ATRAC, MP3, WMA, AAC	✗	22.8 mm 83.1 mm 14.2 mm	29 g (1.02 oz)
E010		NW-E016F	4 GB	April 21, 2007	3-line LCD colour	28-30	USB (output terminal)	ATRAC, MP3, WMA, AAC	✓	22.8 mm 83.1 mm 14.2 mm	
E010		Clear Audio technology adopted from the S700/S600 series.									
E020		NW-E023F	1 GB	March 8, 2008	3-line LCD colour	28-30	USB (output terminal)	MP3, WMA, AAC, ATRAC (Japanese models)	✓	22.3 mm 83.7 mm 16.2 mm	28 g (0.99 oz)
E020		NW-E025F	2 GB	March 8, 2008	3-line LCD colour	28-30	USB (output terminal)	MP3, WMA, AAC, ATRAC (Japanese models)	✓	22.3 mm 83.7 mm 16.2 mm	28 g (0.99 oz)
E020		NW-E026F	4 GB	March 8, 2008	3-line LCD colour	28-30	USB (output terminal)	MP3, WMA, AAC, ATRAC (Japanese models)	✓	22.3 mm 83.7 mm 16.2 mm	28 g (0.99 oz)
E020		Customisable front panel. Also released in some territories outside Japan as NWD-E02x. First E Series player without ATRAC support outside Japan.									
E430		NWZ-E435F	2 GB	August 2008	2" TFT LCD; 240 × 320 (QVGA)	Audio: 45; Video: 8	WM-PORT / USB	MP3, WMA, AAC, WAV	✓	83.9 mm 44 mm 8.5 mm	50 g (1.76 oz)
E430		NWZ-E436F	4 GB	August 2008	2" TFT LCD; 240 × 320 (QVGA)	Audio: 45; Video: 8	WM-PORT / USB	MP3, WMA, AAC, WAV	✓	83.9 mm 44 mm 8.5 mm	50 g (1.76 oz)
E430		NWZ-E438F	8 GB	August 2008	2" TFT LCD; 240 × 320 (QVGA)	Audio: 45; Video: 8	WM-PORT / USB	MP3, WMA, AAC, WAV	✓	83.9 mm 44 mm 8.5 mm	50 g (1.76 oz)
E430		First model of refreshed E Series. Inherits same UI as the A Series.									
E040		NW-E042	2 GB	May 16, 2009	3-line LCD colour	28-30	USB (output terminal)	MP3, WMA, AAC, WAV, ATRAC (Japanese models)	✓	84.9 mm 22.4 mm 16.9 mm	28 g (0.99 oz)
E040		NW-E043	4 GB	May 16, 2009	3-line LCD colour	28-30	USB (output terminal)	MP3, WMA, AAC, WAV, ATRAC (Japanese models)	✓	84.9 mm 22.4 mm 16.9 mm	28 g (0.99 oz)
E040		NW-E044	8 GB	May 16, 2009	3-line LCD colour	28-30	USB (output terminal)	MP3, WMA, AAC, WAV, ATRAC (Japanese models)	✓	84.9 mm 22.4 mm 16.9 mm	28 g (0.99 oz)
E040		Successor to the E020 series. Also released in some Asia Pacific territories as NWZ-E04x.									
E440		NWZ-E443	4 GB	July 2009	2" TFT LCD; 240 × 320 (QVGA)	Audio: 30; Video: 4	WM-PORT / USB	MP3, WMA, AAC, WAV	✓	86.8 mm 44 mm 9.3 mm	54 g (1.9 oz)
E440		NWZ-E444*	8 GB	July 2009	2" TFT LCD; 240 × 320 (QVGA)	Audio: 30; Video: 4	WM-PORT / USB	MP3, WMA, AAC, WAV	✓	86.8 mm 44 mm 9.3 mm	54 g (1.9 oz)
E440		NWZ-E445	16 GB	July 2009	2" TFT LCD; 240 × 320 (QVGA)	Audio: 30; Video: 4	WM-PORT / USB	MP3, WMA, AAC, WAV	✓	86.8 mm 44 mm 9.3 mm	54 g (1.9 oz)
E440		Successor to the E430 series. Addition of ClearAudio technology, voice recording and FM radio recording.									
E340		NWZ-E343	4 GB	December 2009	2" TFT LCD; 240 × 320 (QVGA)	Audio: 30; Video: 4	Mini-B USB / USB	MP3, WMA, AAC, WAV	✓	87.3 mm 44.6 mm 9.7 mm	54 g (1.9 oz)
E340		NWZ-E344	8 GB	December 2009	2" TFT LCD; 240 × 320 (QVGA)	Audio: 30; Video: 4	Mini-B USB / USB	MP3, WMA, AAC, WAV	✓	87.3 mm 44.6 mm 9.7 mm	54 g (1.9 oz)
E340		NWZ-E345	16 GB	December 2009	2" TFT LCD; 240 × 320 (QVGA)	Audio: 30; Video: 4	Mini-B USB / USB	MP3, WMA, AAC, WAV	✓	87.3 mm 44.6 mm 9.7 mm	54 g (1.9 oz)
E340		Compared to E440: lacks voice/FM recording or AVC video support.									
E450		NWZ-E453	4 GB	July 2010	2" TFT LCD; 240 × 320 (QVGA)	Audio: 50; Video: 10	WM-PORT / USB	MP3, WMA, AAC, WAV	✓	95 mm 44.1 mm 10.4 mm	58 g (2 oz)
E450		NWZ-E454	8 GB	July 2010	2" TFT LCD; 240 × 320 (QVGA)	Audio: 50; Video: 10	WM-PORT / USB	MP3, WMA, AAC, WAV	✓	95 mm 44.1 mm 10.4 mm	58 g (2 oz)
E450		NWZ-E455	16 GB	July 2010	2" TFT LCD; 240 × 320 (QVGA)	Audio: 50; Video: 10	WM-PORT / USB	MP3, WMA, AAC, WAV	✓	95 mm 44.1 mm 10.4 mm	58 g (2 oz)
E450		Successor to the E440 series. Refreshed UI. Addition of DSEE technology and SensMe Channels. Removal of FM recording.									
E350		NWZ-E353	4 GB	August 2010	2" TFT LCD; 240 × 320 (QVGA)	Audio: 50; Video: 10	Mini-B USB / USB	MP3, WMA, AAC, WAV	✓	94.7 mm 44 mm 9.7 mm	58 g (2 oz)
E350		NWZ-E354	8 GB	August 2010	2" TFT LCD; 240 × 320 (QVGA)	Audio: 50; Video: 10	Mini-B USB / USB	MP3, WMA, AAC, WAV	✓	94.7 mm 44 mm 9.7 mm	58 g (2 oz)
E350		NWZ-E355	16 GB	August 2010	2" TFT LCD; 240 × 320 (QVGA)	Audio: 50; Video: 10	Mini-B USB / USB	MP3, WMA, AAC, WAV	✓	94.7 mm 44 mm 9.7 mm	58 g (2 oz)
E350		Compared to E450: lacks voice recording and AVC video support.									
E050		NW-E052	2 GB	October 9, 2010	1.4" TFT LCD; 128 × 160 (QQVGA)	Audio: 30	WM-PORT / USB	MP3, WMA, AAC, WAV, ATRAC (Japanese models)	✓	77 mm 35.5 mm 10.3 mm	43 g (1.52 oz)
E050		NWZ-E053	4 GB	October 9, 2010	1.4" TFT LCD; 128 × 160 (QQVGA)	Audio: 30	WM-PORT / USB	MP3, WMA, AAC, WAV, ATRAC (Japanese models)	✓	77 mm 35.5 mm 10.3 mm	43 g (1.52 oz)
E050		Released in Japan and Singapore along with some emerging markets. No video-playing capabilities.									
E460		NWZ-E463	4 GB	August 2011	2" TFT LCD; 240 × 320 (QVGA)	Audio: 50; Video: 10	WM-PORT / USB	MP3, WMA, AAC, WAV	✓	96.8 mm 45 mm 10 mm	58 g (2 oz)
E460		NWZ-E464	8 GB	August 2011	2" TFT LCD; 240 × 320 (QVGA)	Audio: 50; Video: 10	WM-PORT / USB	MP3, WMA, AAC, WAV	✓	96.8 mm 45 mm 10 mm	58 g (2 oz)
E460		NWZ-E465	16 GB	August 2011	2" TFT LCD; 240 × 320 (QVGA)	Audio: 50; Video: 10	WM-PORT / USB	MP3, WMA, AAC, WAV	✓	96.8 mm 45 mm 10 mm	58 g (2 oz)
E460		Successor to the E450 series.									
E360		NWZ-E363	4 GB	November 2011	2" TFT LCD; 240 × 320 (QVGA)	Audio: 30; Video: 4	Mini-B USB / USB	MP3, WMA, AAC, WAV	✓	87.5 mm 45 mm 9.9 mm	55 g (2 oz)
E360		NWZ-E364	8 GB	November 2011	2" TFT LCD; 240 × 320 (QVGA)	Audio: 30; Video: 4	Mini-B USB / USB	MP3, WMA, AAC, WAV	✓	87.5 mm 45 mm 9.9 mm	55 g (2 oz)
E360		NWZ-E365	16 GB	November 2011	2" TFT LCD; 240 × 320 (QVGA)	Audio: 30; Video: 4	Mini-B USB / USB	MP3, WMA, AAC, WAV	✓	87.5 mm 45 mm 9.9 mm	55 g (2 oz)
E360		Redesigned E3xx range. Compared to E460: lacks voice recording or AVC video support.									
E060 (Japan)		NW-E062	2 GB	February 11, 2012	1.4" TFT LCD; 128 × 160 (QQVGA)	Audio: 30	WM-PORT / USB	ATRAC, MP3, WMA, AAC, WAV	✓	77.5 mm 35.5 mm 9.1 mm	37 g (1.3 oz)
E060 (Japan)		NW-E063	4 GB	February 11, 2012	1.4" TFT LCD; 128 × 160 (QQVGA)	Audio: 30	WM-PORT / USB	ATRAC, MP3, WMA, AAC, WAV	✓	77.5 mm 35.5 mm 9.1 mm	37 g (1.3 oz)
E060 (Japan)		Addition of noise cancelling.									
E470 / E570		NWZ-E473	4 GB	July 2012	2" TFT LCD; 240 × 320 (QVGA)	Audio: 30-36; Video: 5-6	WM-PORT / USB	MP3, WMA, AAC, WAV	✓	97.2 mm 43.3 mm 7.4 mm	51 g (1.8 oz)
E470 / E570		NWZ-E474	8 GB	July 2012	2" TFT LCD; 240 × 320 (QVGA)	Audio: 30-36; Video: 5-6	WM-PORT / USB	MP3, WMA, AAC, WAV	✓	97.2 mm 43.3 mm 7.4 mm	51 g (1.8 oz)
E470 / E570		NWZ-E475	16 GB	July 2012	2" TFT LCD; 240 × 320 (QVGA)	Audio: 30-36; Video: 5-6	WM-PORT / USB	MP3, WMA, AAC, WAV	✓	97.2 mm 43.3 mm 7.4 mm	51 g (1.8 oz)
E470 / E570		NWZ-E573	4 GB	July 2012	2" TFT LCD; 240 × 320 (QVGA)	Audio: 30-36; Video: 5-6	WM-PORT / USB	MP3, WMA, AAC, WAV	✓	97.2 mm 43.3 mm 7.4 mm	51 g (1.8 oz)
E470 / E570		NWZ-E574	8 GB	July 2012	2" TFT LCD; 240 × 320 (QVGA)	Audio: 30-36; Video: 5-6	WM-PORT / USB	MP3, WMA, AAC, WAV	✓	97.2 mm 43.3 mm 7.4 mm	51 g (1.8 oz)
E470 / E570		NWZ-E575	16 GB	July 2012	2" TFT LCD; 240 × 320 (QVGA)	Audio: 30-36; Video: 5-6	WM-PORT / USB	MP3, WMA, AAC, WAV	✓	97.2 mm 43.3 mm 7.4 mm	51 g (1.8 oz)
E470 / E570		Removal of voice recording capability. E570 adds digital noise cancelling compared to E470.									
E370		NWZ-E373	4 GB	July 2012	1.77" TFT LCD; 128 × 160 (QQVGA)	Audio: 30; Video: 4	Mini-B USB / USB	MP3, WMA, AAC, WAV	✓	87.7 mm 43.4 mm 9.9 mm	52 g (1.83 oz)
E370		NWZ-E374	8 GB	July 2012	1.77" TFT LCD; 128 × 160 (QQVGA)	Audio: 30; Video: 4	Mini-B USB / USB	MP3, WMA, AAC, WAV	✓	87.7 mm 43.4 mm 9.9 mm	52 g (1.83 oz)
E370		NWZ-E375	16 GB	July 2012	1.77" TFT LCD; 128 × 160 (QQVGA)	Audio: 30; Video: 4	Mini-B USB / USB	MP3, WMA, AAC, WAV	✓	87.7 mm 43.4 mm 9.9 mm	52 g (1.83 oz)
E580		NWZ-E583	4 GB	July 2013	2" TFT LCD; 240 × 320 (QVGA)	Audio: 62-77; Video: 13-14	WM-PORT / USB	MP3, WMA, AAC, WAV, FLAC	✓	92 mm 41 mm 7 mm	49 g (1.73 oz)
E580		NWZ-E584	8 GB	July 2013	2" TFT LCD; 240 × 320 (QVGA)	Audio: 62-77; Video: 13-14	WM-PORT / USB	MP3, WMA, AAC, WAV, FLAC	✓	92 mm 41 mm 7 mm	49 g (1.73 oz)
E580		NWZ-E585	16 GB	July 2013	2" TFT LCD; 240 × 320 (QVGA)	Audio: 62-77; Video: 13-14	WM-PORT / USB	MP3, WMA, AAC, WAV, FLAC	✓	92 mm 41 mm 7 mm	49 g (1.73 oz)
E580		Digital noise cancelling. DSEE HX. Support for FLAC audio format.									
E380		NWZ-E383	4 GB	July 2013	1.77" TFT LCD; 128 × 160 (QQVGA)	Audio: 30; Video: 4	Mini-B USB / USB	MP3, WMA, AAC, WAV	✓	87 mm 43 mm 10 mm	52 g (1.83 oz)
E380		NWZ-E384	8 GB	July 2013	1.77" TFT LCD; 128 × 160 (QQVGA)	Audio: 30; Video: 4	Mini-B USB / USB	MP3, WMA, AAC, WAV	✓	87 mm 43 mm 10 mm	52 g (1.83 oz)
E380		NWZ-E385	16 GB	July 2013	1.77" TFT LCD; 128 × 160 (QQVGA)	Audio: 30; Video: 4	Mini-B USB / USB	MP3, WMA, AAC, WAV	✓	87 mm 43 mm 10 mm	52 g (1.83 oz)
E380		Removal of side volume keys (volume operation using the 5-way button) and HOLD switch.									
E080 (Japan)		NW-E083	4 GB	October 19, 2013	2" TFT LCD; 240 × 320 (QVGA)	Audio: 30-36	WM-PORT / USB	ATRAC, MP3, WMA, AAC, WAV	✓	92.1 mm 42.1 mm 8 mm	46 g (1.62 oz)
E080 (Japan)		Budget model complementing the NW-S780.									
E390		NW-E393	4 GB	February 2016	1.77" TFT LCD; 128 × 160 (QQVGA)	Audio: 35	Micro-B USB / USB	MP3, WMA, AAC, WAV	✓	92 mm 43 mm 10 mm	39 g (1.38 oz)
E390		NW-E394	8 GB	February 2016	1.77" TFT LCD; 128 × 160 (QQVGA)	Audio: 35	Micro-B USB / USB	MP3, WMA, AAC, WAV	✓	92 mm 43 mm 10 mm	39 g (1.38 oz)
E390		NW-E395	16 GB	February 2016	1.77" TFT LCD; 128 × 160 (QQVGA)	Audio: 35	Micro-B USB / USB	MP3, WMA, AAC, WAV	✓	92 mm 43 mm 10 mm	39 g (1.38 oz)
E390		New shape and new user interface. Restoration of volume keys and HOLD switch. No video-playing capability.									

== See also ==
- Sony Walkman
- List of Sony Walkman products
