= Andreas Pavel =

- Born: 1945 (age 80–81); Brandenburg an der Havel
- Education: Free University of Berlin
- Engineering career
- Significant design: Stereobelt

Andreas Pavel is a German-Brazilian cultural producer and media designer who is generally credited with patenting the personal stereo

Born in Brandenburg an der Havel, Germany, Pavel was the son of a German industrialist and vice-president of the Federation of German in Industries. At six years of age, his family moved to Morumbi, São Paulo where his father took a managing position at Matarazzo Industries.

Having studied philosophy and social sciences at the Free University of Berlin, Pavel returned to Brazil in 1967 and started his professional career as head of programming of the newly founded public broadcasting station, TV Cultura. 1970 he took up editorial planning at Abril Cultural, where he edited partwork encyclopaedias for nationwide newsstand distribution, most notably the philosophical source collection "Great Thinkers" and a reference series of "Brazilian Popular Music".

In March 1977, Pavel filed the a patent application for his Stereobelt in Italy, followed by further applications in Germany, United States, United Kingdom, and Japan. Pavel subsequently tried to interest companies like Uher, Beyer, B&O, and Brionvega in manufacturing his device.

In 1989, Pavel started infringement proceedings against Sony in the UK. Four years later, the British patent was invalidated by a British judge. The exact settlement fee is not known, but European press accounts said that it is estimated that Pavel received a cash settlement in excess of $10,000,000 and received some royalties on Walkman sales.
