= List of Sony Walkman products =

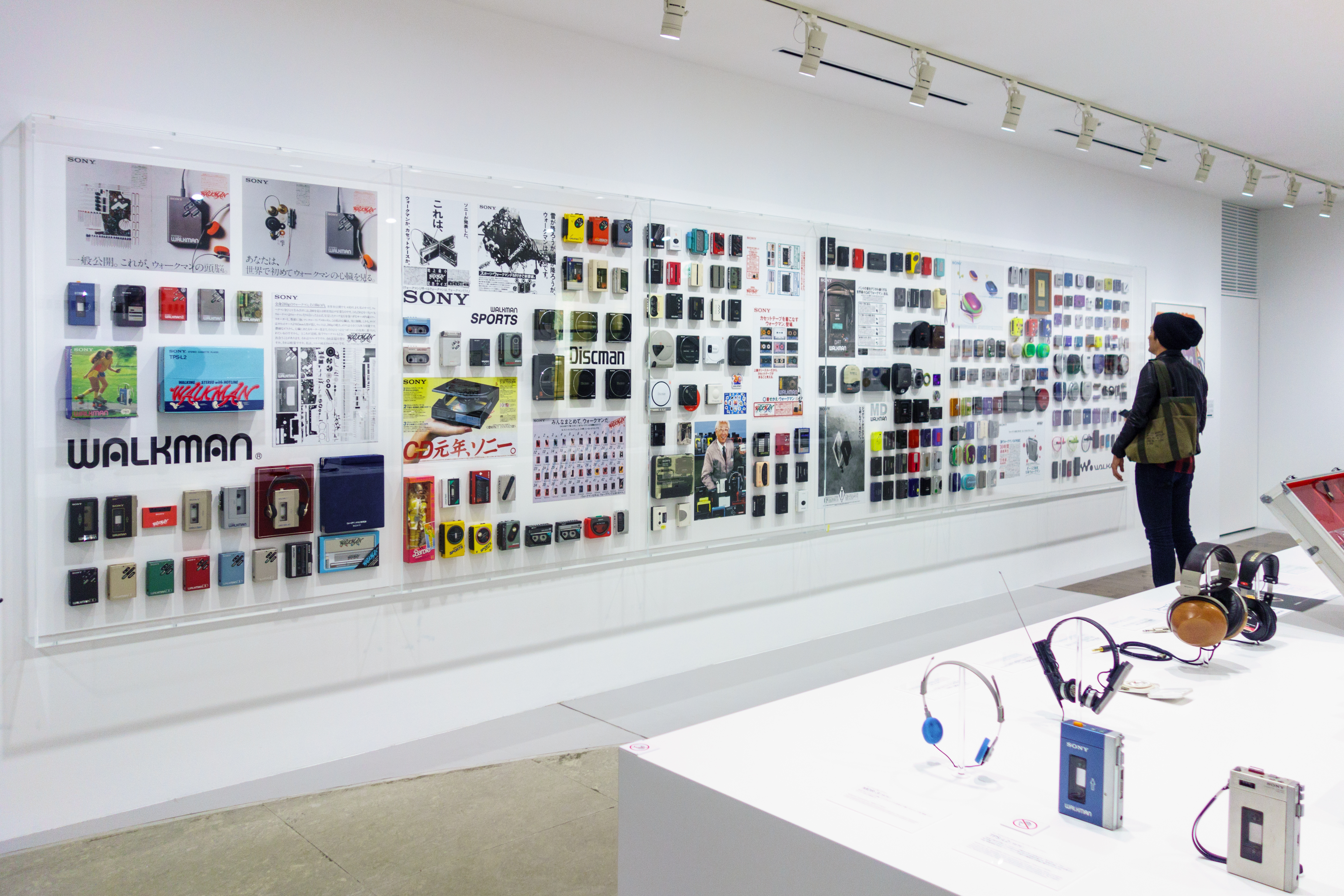
Various Sony Walkman products ranging from 1979 to 2016, on display at an expo in Tokyo

The following is a partial list of Sony Walkman products which includes products of various formats under the brand. Up to March 2010 Sony built 400 million Walkmans (of which slightly over half - 200.02 million - were original cassette Walkmans) worldwide.

== Walkman (original cassette tape) ==
The original Sony Walkman TPS-L2 was introduced on July 1, 1979. It sold for ¥33,000. Only about 3,000 units were sold in its first month, but the model eventually sold about 1.5 million units worldwide. Through the 1980s and 1990s, Sony created many versions and variations in the cassette tape Walkman line such as the DD series and WM series. In October 2010, Sony announced that it would stop manufacturing and selling cassette Walkmans in Japan, having shipped the final lot to retailers in April 2010. By March 2010, Sony had sold more than 400 million Walkman products worldwide, of which about 200 million were cassette models.

Below is an incomplete list of cassette tape based Walkman models.

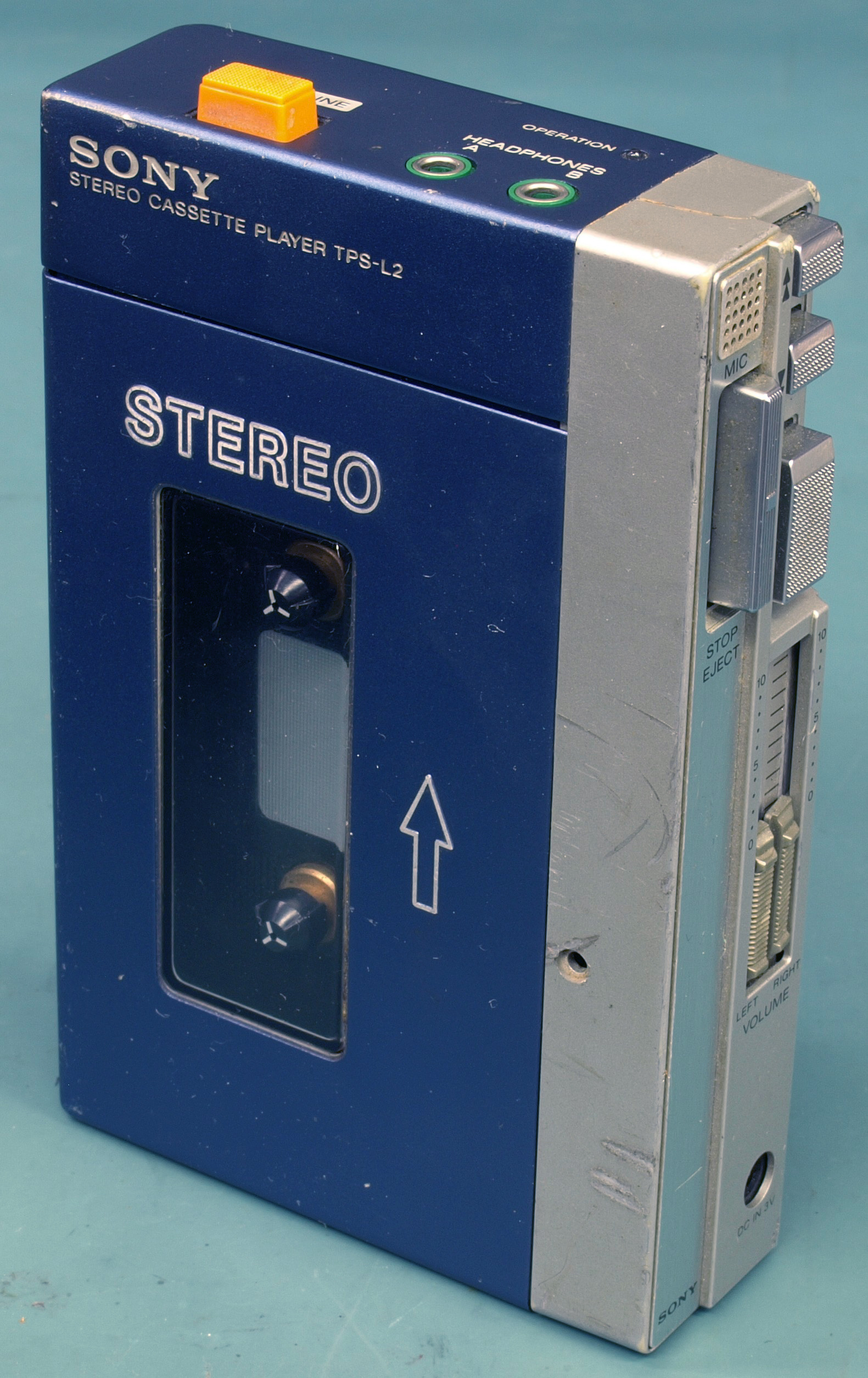
Sony Walkman TPS-L2, from 1979

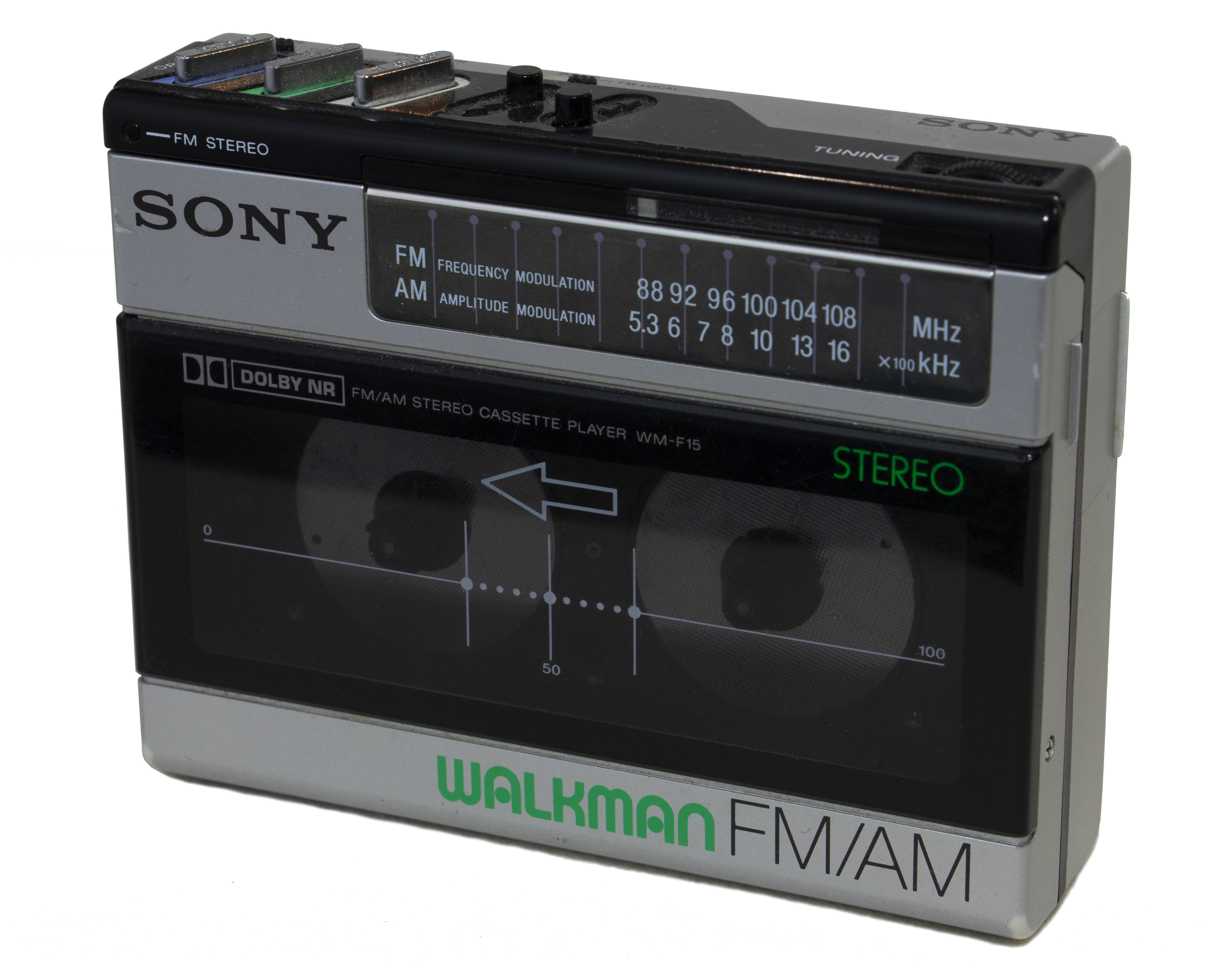
Sony Walkman WM-F15, released 1984

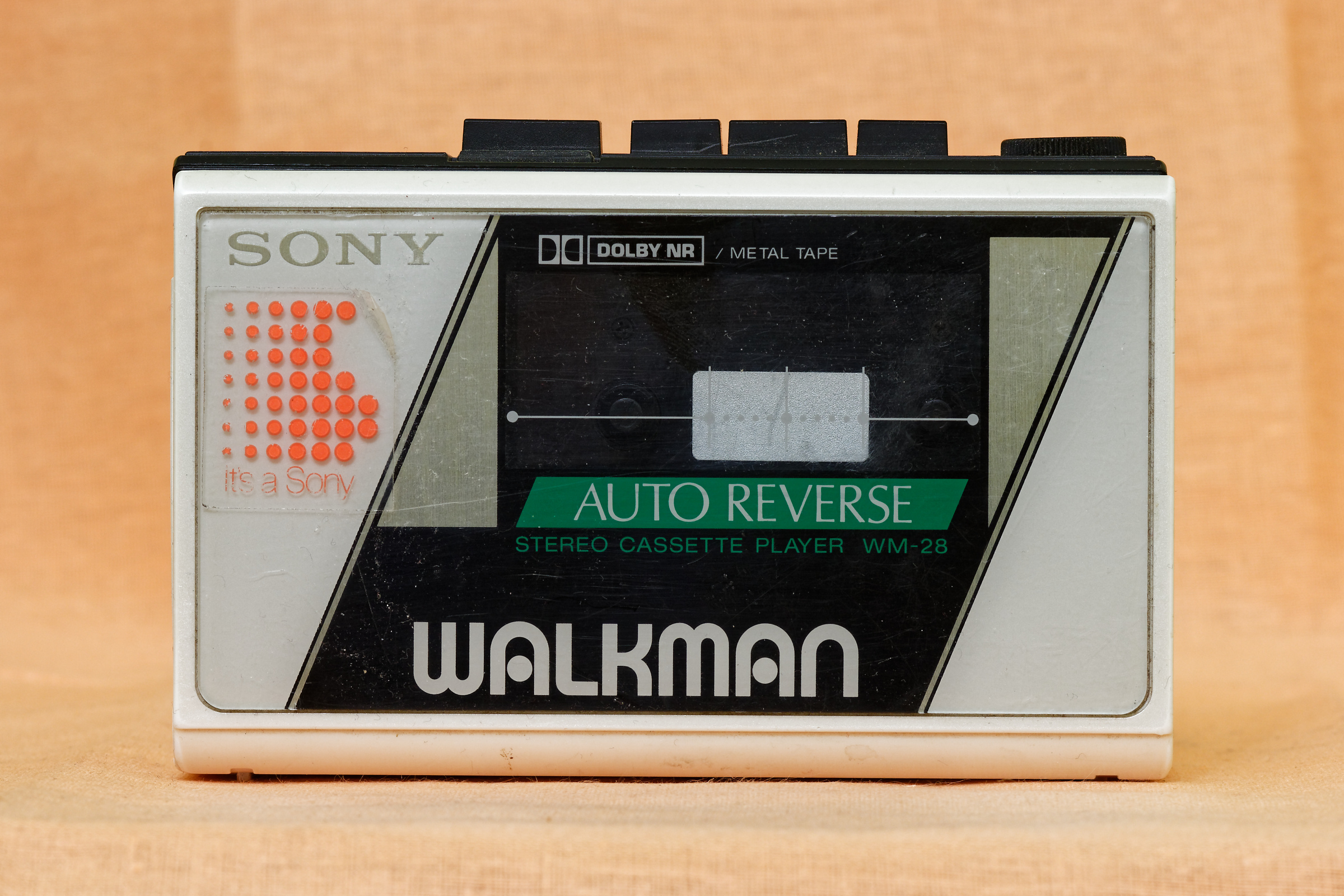
Sony Walkman WM-28, early 1980s

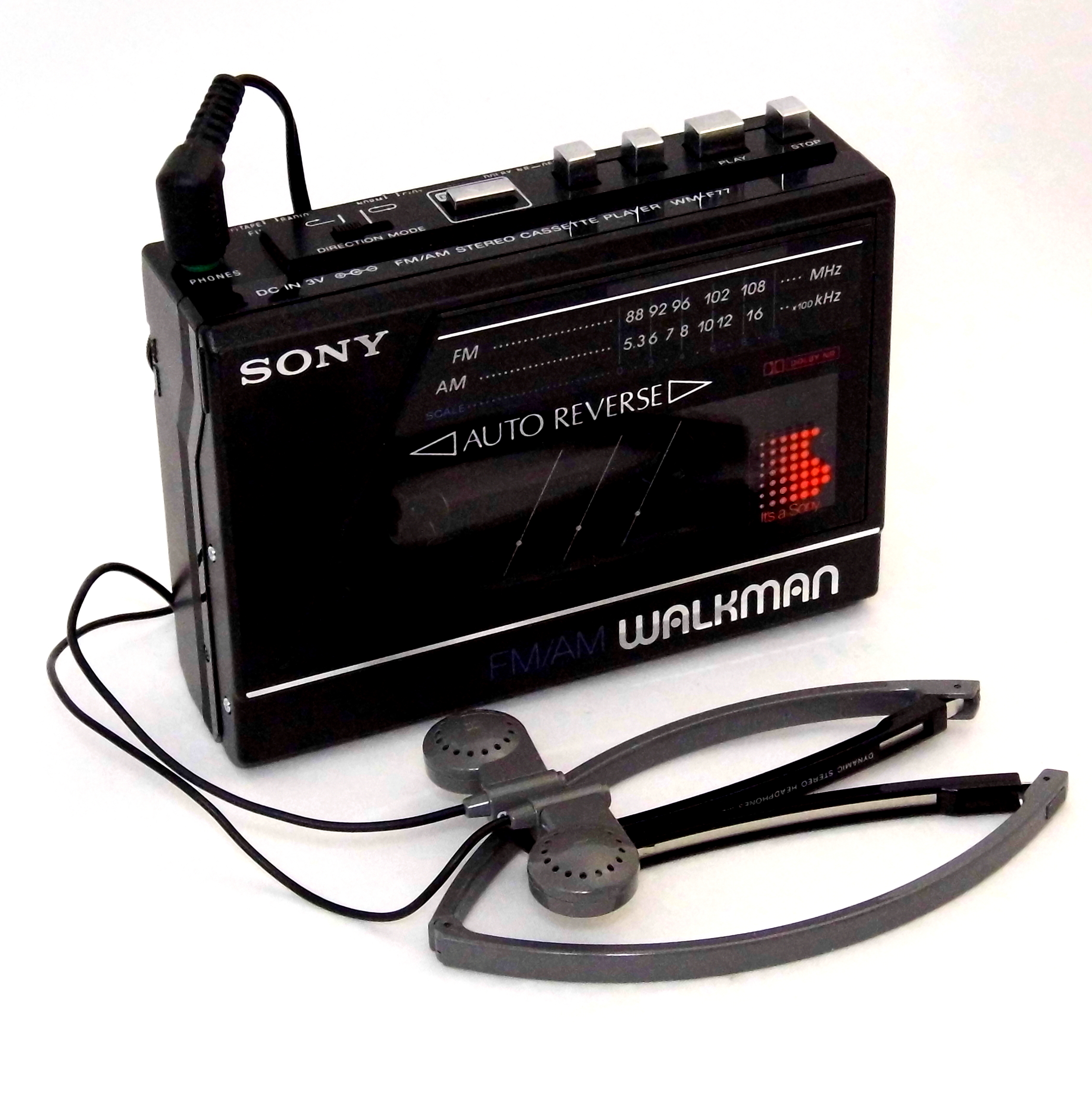
Sony Walkman WM-F77, circa 1986

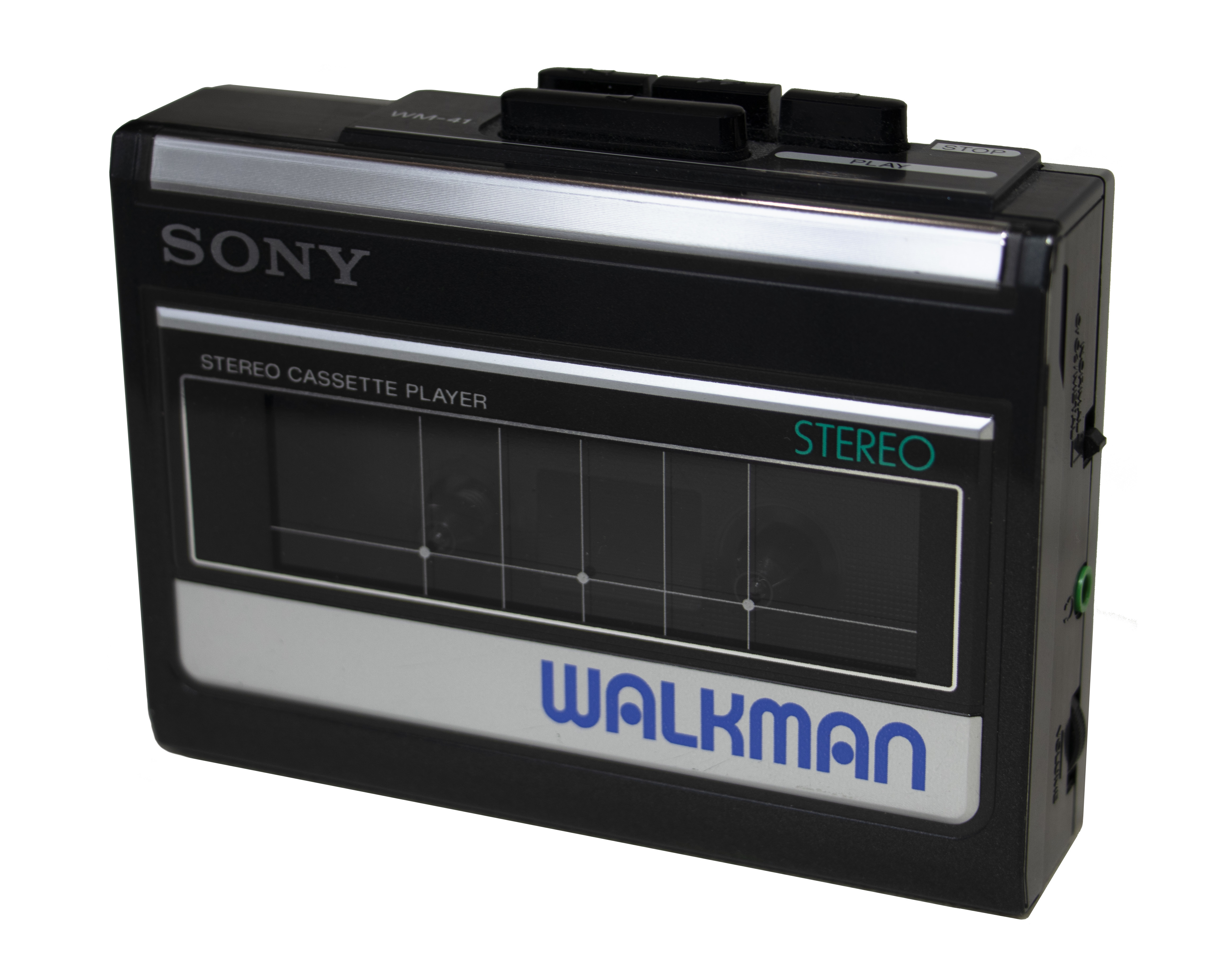
Sony Walkman WM-41, released 1987

List of Sony Walkman cassette tape models
Model	Year	MSRP (¥)	Region	About
TPS-L2	1979	33000 ¥		First Walkman model
WM-2	1981	32000 ¥		
WM-1	1981			
WM-3	1981			TPS-L2 renamed. Sold in black instead of blue. Capable of playing Metal cassette tapes
WM-5	1982		Japan/USA	
WM-7	1982	36000 ¥		
WM-D6	1982			First in the Sony "Professional" Walkman line. Essentially a minaturised Sony TC-D5 tape deck. Capable of recording on Chrome and Metal cassette tapes with Dolby B Noise Reduction. First Walkman to feature a Disc Drive tape transport and Quartz lock.
WM-DD	1982	28000 ¥		
WM-F2	1982	42000 ¥		
WM-R2	1982	37000 ¥		
WM-20	1983	27000 ¥		
WM-F20	1983			FM radio
WM-4	1983			
WM-9	1983		Japan	
WM-10	1983			Smallest cassette Walkman. Must be extended before use.
WM-6	1984			
WM-F8	1984			AM/FM stereo radio
WM-16	1984			
WM-22	1984			
WM-F15	1984			AM/FM stereo radio
WM-D6C				Second in the Sony "Professional" Walkman line. A revised WM-D6 with the addition of being able to record on Dolby C Noise Reduction
WM-24	1985			
WM-25	1985			
WM-30	1985			
WM-75	1985			
WM-D3	1985			Last and cheapest in the Sony "Professional" Walkman line. Lacks a Quartz lock and Dolby C from the D6C. But fitted with a capstan Disc Drive and capable of recording on Chrome cassette tapes.
WM-34	1986			
WM-35	1986			
WM-F35	1986			AM stereo/FM stereo radio, Sports
WM-55	1986			
WM-60	1986			
WM-F16	1986	AU$149		AM stereo/FM stereo radio
WM-33	1987			
WM-36	1987			
WM-38	1987			
WM-F38	1987			AM/FM stereo radio
WM-41	1987			
WM-43	1987			
WM-51	1987			
WM-F66	1987			AM/FM stereo radio
WM-102	1987			
WM-B10	1988			
WM-B12	1988			
WM-F404	1988	32300 ¥		AM/FM stereo radio, so-dbb bass, Dolby B noise reduction, auto-reverse, cassette recorder
WM-B52	1988			
WM-503	1989			
WM-AF54	1989			AM stereo/FM stereo radio, Sports
WM-3000	1990			
WM-3060	1990			
WM-106	1990			
WM-B603	1991			
WM-FX513	1993	None	US/Europe	An export-only model. Digital AM/FM radio, Mega Bass, Dolby B noise reduction, auto-reverse, Auto Music Search
WM-EX102	1994			
WM-FX221	1995		US/Europe	An export-only model. AM/FM Stereo radio, AVLS
WM-GX320	1998			FM stereo, Mega bass, tape speed control, auto-reverse, continuous loop
WM-EX670	1999			Full functionality available on the Walkman itself via the Function button, as well as by a remote
WM-GX400	2001			AM/FM stereo radio, auto-reverse, tape speed control, auto-reverse, AVLS

== Radio Walkman ==
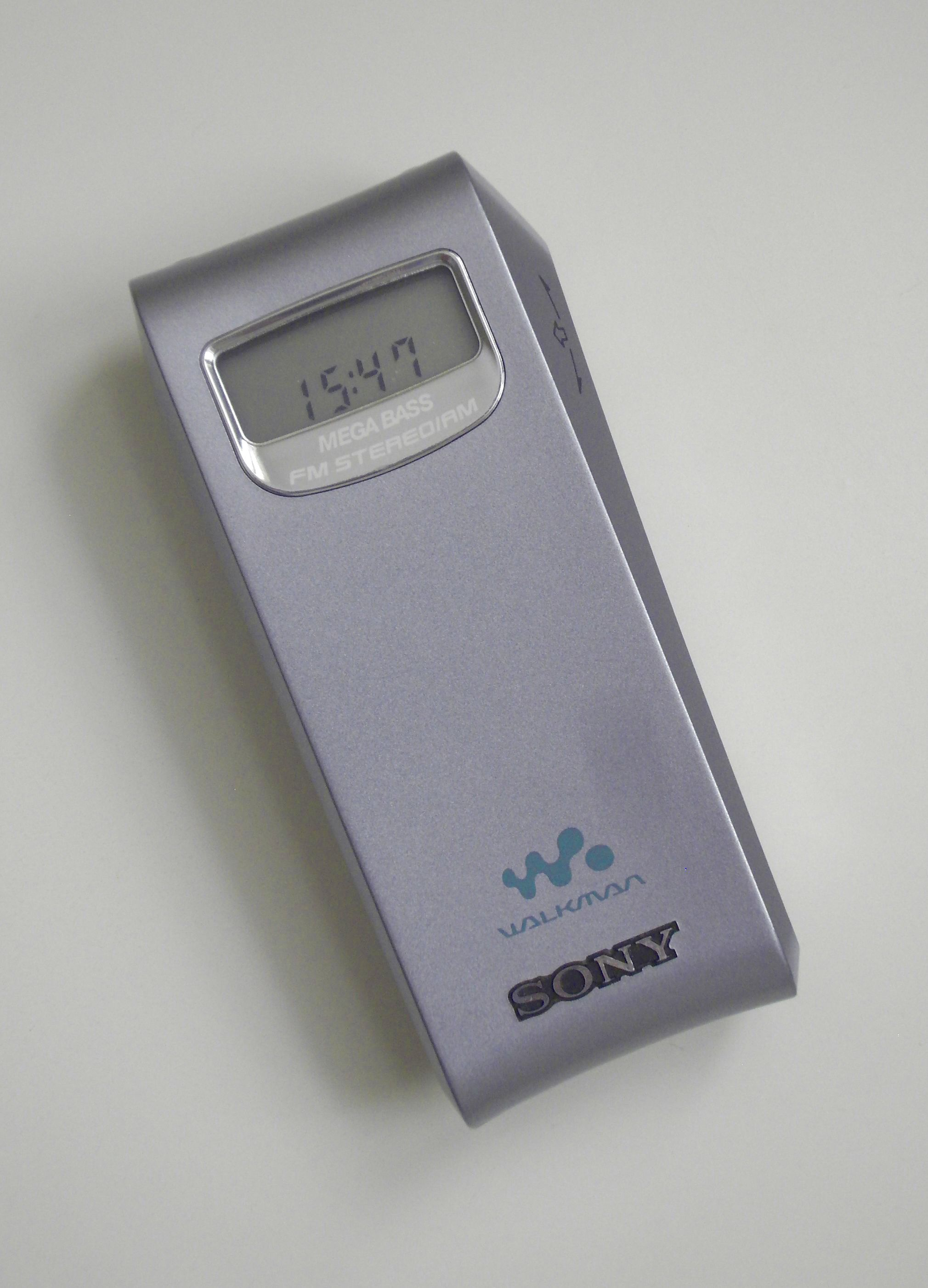
A Walkman FM/AM radio receiver from the 2000s

Sony branded portable radio receivers with the "FM Walkman" name starting with the SRF-40 in 1980. Various FM, AM and DAB receivers have been made.

== CD Walkman (formerly Discman) ==
Originally launched as Discman in 1984.

ATRAC3, ATRAC3plus, MP3 supported CD Walkman models:

- 2003: D-NE1, D-NE9, D-NE510
- 2004: D-NE10, D-NE900, D-NE800, D-NE20, D-NE920, D-NE820
- 2005: D-NE720, D-NE830

== Video Walkman ==
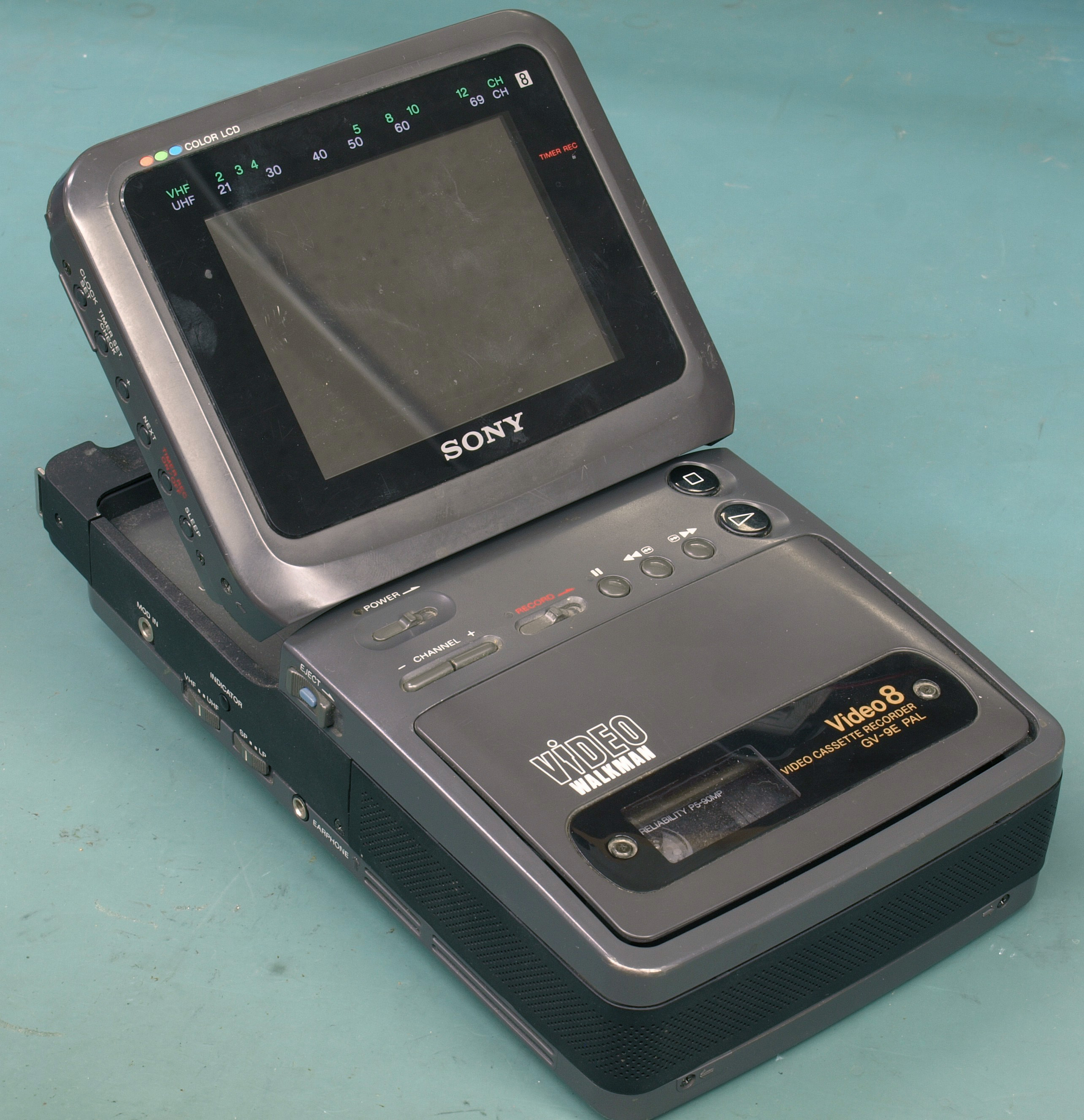
The original Video8 format Video Walkman (GV-9)

Sony's first brand extension of the Walkman cassette players were portable Video8 cassette recorders with color LCDs, released 1989. Video Walkman units for the later MiniDV and Digital8 formats were also released.

- GV-D1000 MiniDV Video Walkman
- GV-D900E PAL Mini DV

== DAT Walkman ==
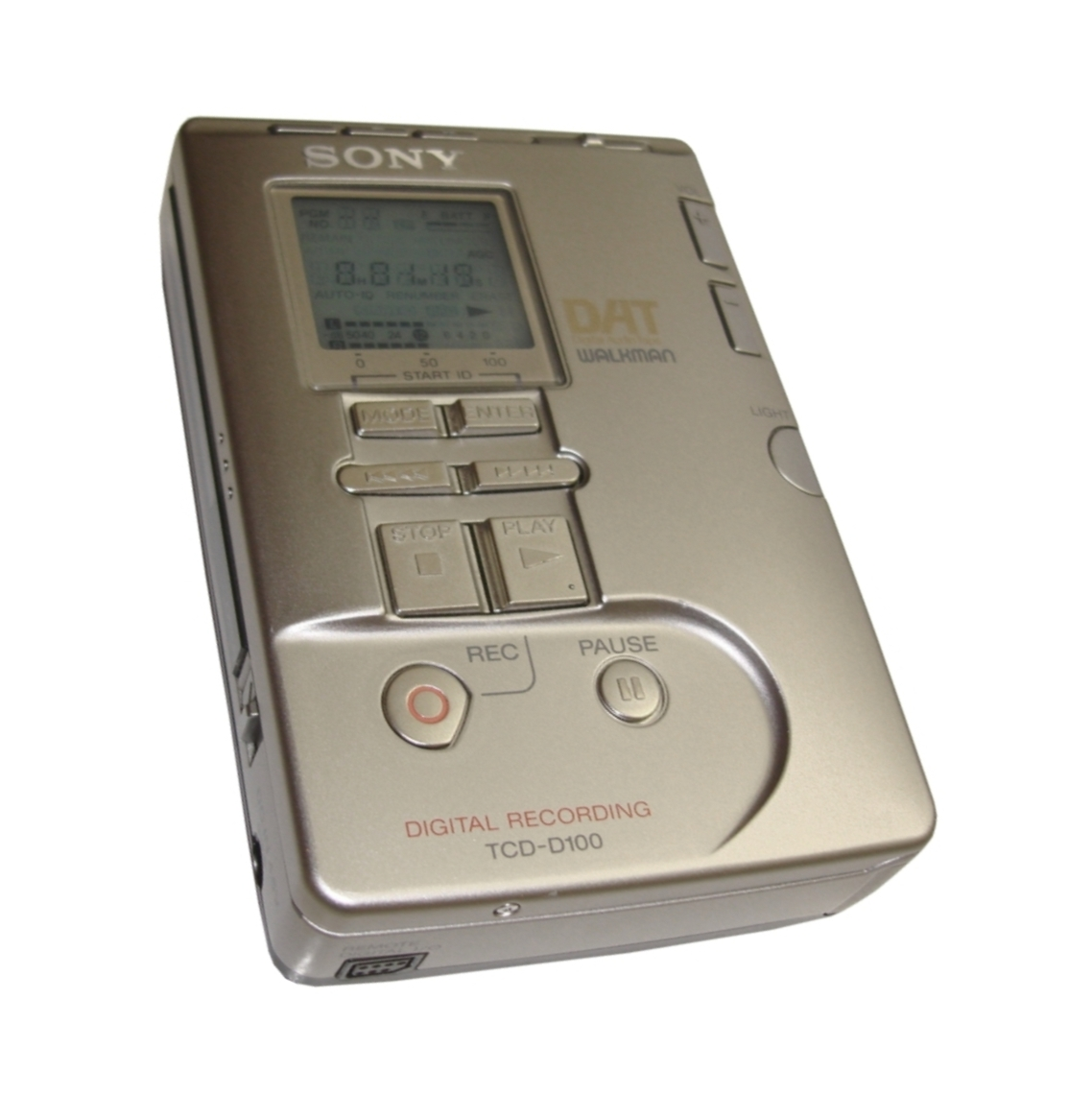
TCD-D100 DAT Walkman (1997)

Portable Digital Audio Tape (DAT) players called DAT Walkman were made. The first model, TCD-D3, was released in 1990. The final model, TCD-D100, was discontinued in Japan in 2005.

== MiniDisc Walkman ==
MD Walkman logo

The first MiniDisc Walkmans ("MD WALKMAN"), MZ-1 (recorder/player) and MZ-2P (player), were released in 1992. Until end of 1998 4.6 million units of the MD Walkman were built. Production of the final MiniDisc Walkman, MZ-RH1 (Hi-MD), stopped in September 2011. List of models:

- supported MDLP
  - 2000: MZ-E500, MZ-E700, MZ-E900, MZ-R900
  - 2001: MZ-E909, MZ-R909
  - 2002: MZ-E10
- Net-MD
  - 2001: MZ-N1
  - 2002: MZ-N10
  - 2003: MZ-N910
- Hi-MD
  - 2004: MZ-NH1, MZ-NH3D, MZ-EH1
  - 2005: MZ-DH10P, MZ-RH910, MZ-RH10
  - 2006: MZ-RH1

=== R Series ===
The MZ-R2 was one of the earliest MD Walkman products, released in December 1993. It was followed by the MZ-R3.

=== E Series ===
The MZ-E series models are all exclusively players (i.e. they do not record).

The MZ-E50 was the smallest and lightest MiniDisc player when released in late 1996.

=== B Series ===
The first B model was the MZ-B3 recorder from 1995. There were later also the MZ-B50 recorder, released October 2000, the MZ-B100, and the MZ-B10.

=== G Series ===
https://www.minidisc.wiki/equipment/sony/portable/mz-g750 https://www.minidisc.wiki/equipment/sony/portable/mz-g755

=== N Series ===
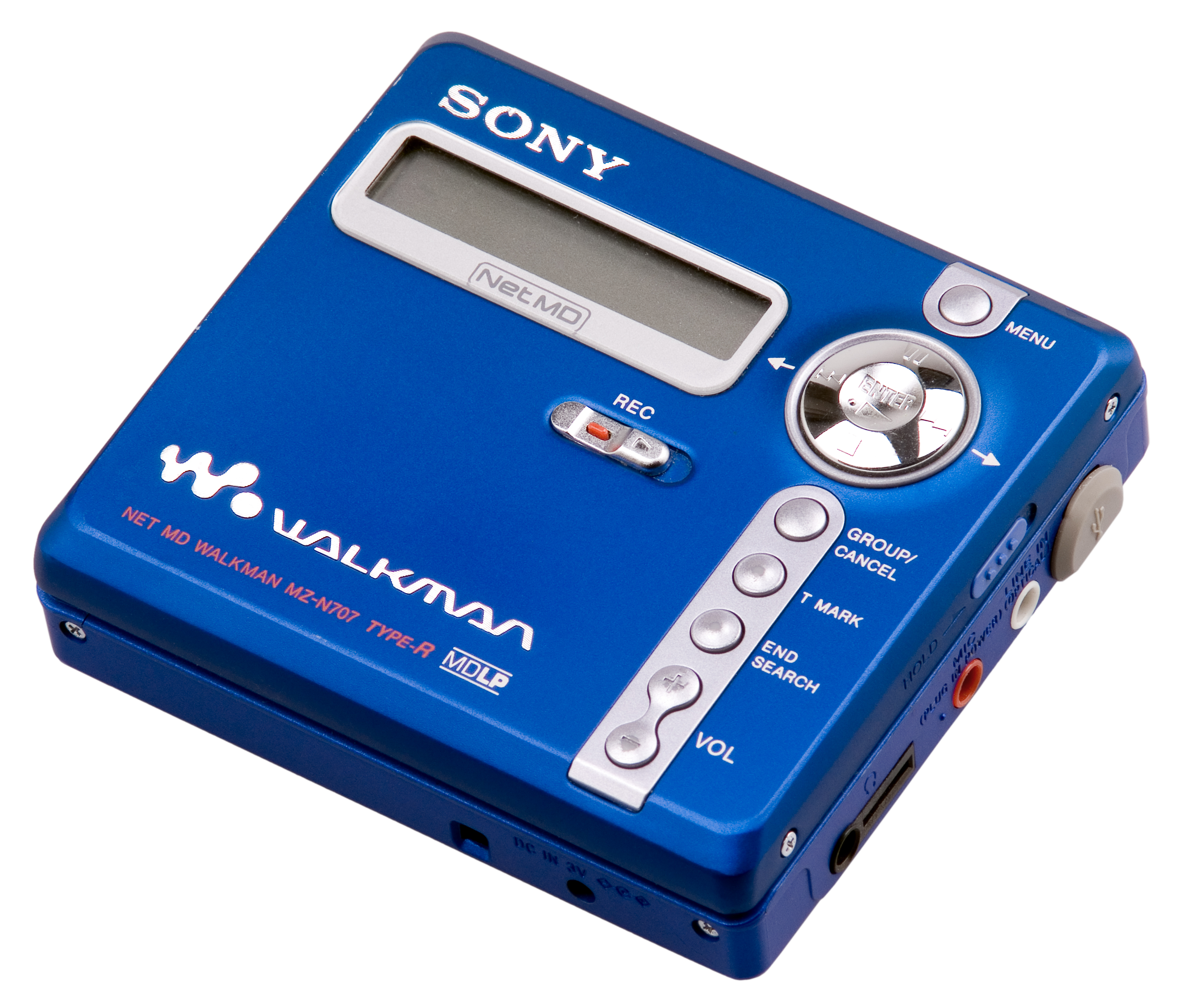
NetMD MZ-N707 (2002)

Sony expanded MiniDisc's possibilities with the introduction of NetMD (NetworkMD). These allowed the use of a PC to convert music from CDs or MP3s into ATRAC3 format, and use a USB cable to transfer the music to the MiniDisc at a much faster rate than was possible when using a line-in cable.

The MZ-N10 was released in 2002. It was Sony's '10th Anniversary' product, released 10 years after the introduction of the MiniDisc format in 1992. The case was made from a magnesium alloy, and the unit featured a built-in lithium-ion battery which provided 24 hours of battery life. The MZ-N10 allowed music to be transferred from a PC at up to 64 times actual playback speed, not including the time required for audio re-encoding. It was also the first MD Walkman to incorporate the ATRAC DSP TYPE S codec, and is today (2006) the lightest recording MD Walkman ever produced. The accompanying 10th anniversary playback-only MiniDisc Walkman, the MZ-E10, was also released. It is the lightest MD Walkman ever produced, weighing 55 g (including built-in rechargeable battery) with a thickness of 9.9 mm.

=== Hi-MD compatible players ===
In 2004, Sony introduced the Hi-MD format. Hi-MD Walkmans use 1 GB Hi-MD discs in the same form-factor as regular MiniDiscs, and allow 1 GB of files and/or audio to be stored per disc. They also accept regular MiniDiscs, which can be initialized in Hi-MD mode for 305 MB capacity per disc (with the added ability to store audio and data, like Hi-MD discs).

Unlike NetMD, Hi-MD Walkmans allow two-way digital transfers to and from PCs virtually unrestricted. Hi-MD also allows the option to record and transfer audio in lossless linear PCM on standard MiniDiscs and Hi-MD discs. This offers sound quality equal to CD (as opposed to lossy ATRAC codecs used on standard MiniDisc/ NetMD).

Hi-MD Walkmans introduced from 2005 onwards allowed direct playback of MP3s without the need to transcode the MP3s to ATRAC format. However, SonicStage is required for transfer onto the disc itself. Playable audio cannot be transferred to the devices without SonicStage.

== DVD Walkman (formerly DVD Discman) ==
In 1998 portable DVD players called DVD Discman were released. New models from 2001 were rebranded as "DVD Walkman".

== Walkman (formerly Network Walkman) ==
Released in 1999, these would be the first "memory type" Walkman, which remain the only current product type still in production. Initially from 2000 these products were collectively called Network Walkman to distinguish from other types of Walkman such as the cassette one. By 2006 the branded name for memory type Walkman became solely Walkman, which continues to this day.

As Sony did not initially support the MP3 format, which was already the dominant format among its industry competitors, Sony's players were not officially called "MP3 players". At the start, the Memory Stick flash players were officially called (albeit not necessarily marketed as) "Portable Memory Stick Audio Players"; embedded flash players were officially called "Portable IC Audio Players"; hard disk players were given the official moniker of "Portable Hard Disk Audio Players". From 2005, all digital memory devices of the Walkman line were simply called "Digital Audio Players" or, as video capabilities became more common, "Digital Media Players".

From 2007 to 2015, Walkman players for export markets had a NWZ- product code prefix instead of NW-. The main difference was the removal of compatibility with the ATRAC audio codec.

=== Memory Stick Walkman ===
==== NW-MS7 ====
MS Walkman logo, used on the NW-MS7 player

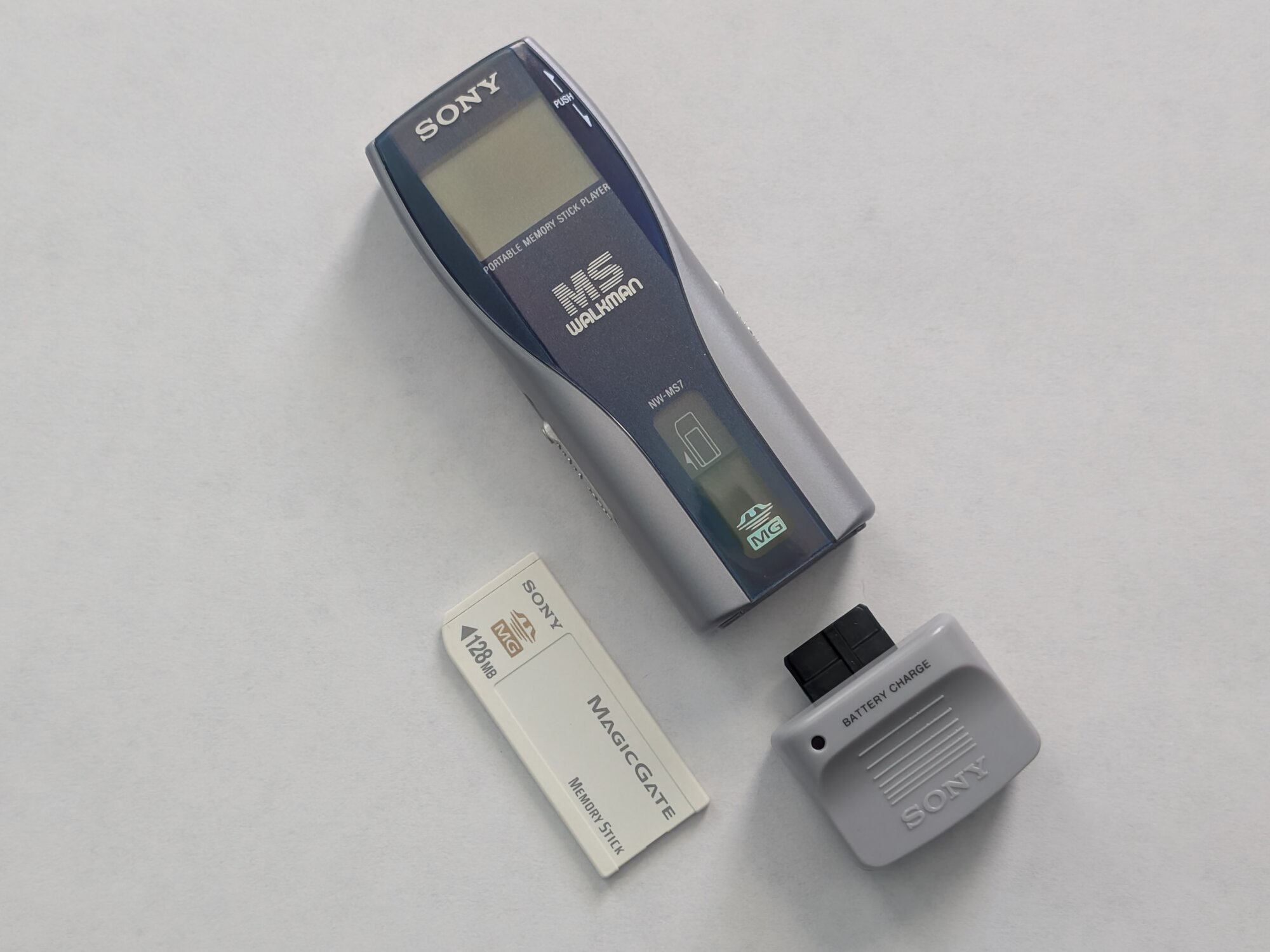
Sony NW-MS7

The NW-MS7 "Memory Stick Walkman" was introduced on September 22, 1999 during a Walkman 20th anniversary event as Sony's first foray into the portable solid state music player industry. The player was very small and light (69 g) with a "stylish" design. It shipped with a white 64 MB MagicGate Memory Stick and built-in battery, selling it alongside the later NW-E3 (64 MB built-in and using two AAA batteries for 4 to 5 hours playback duration). The player could only play ATRAC formatted files, Sony's proprietary format, so was not technically an "MP3 player". The user needed to transfer songs via USB with bundled software OpenMG Jukebox (only works with Windows 98 software, later known as SonicStage). Any files not in the ATRAC format (i.e. MP3s) needed to be converted before they could be transferred and played. Popular software players at the time, such as Winamp, did not support the ATRAC format, leading to users needing to store both MP3 and ATRAC copies of songs on their computers. Additionally, only new MagicGate Memory Sticks were supported.

Sony also advertised the player as having "robust" copyright protection by adhering to standards including Secure Digital Music Initiative. It would only play protected legal music downloads.

It was released on December 21, 1999 in Japan with a price of 45,000 JPY, followed by January 2000 in the United States for $399. It was the first and only memory type Walkman to use the classic "WALKMAN" logo, with the NW-MS7 branded as MS WALKMAN. In 2000 the current "W." logo was created to fit more easily on the increasingly shrinking size of devices, and the Walkman brand was unified.

==== NW-MS9/MS10/MS11 ====
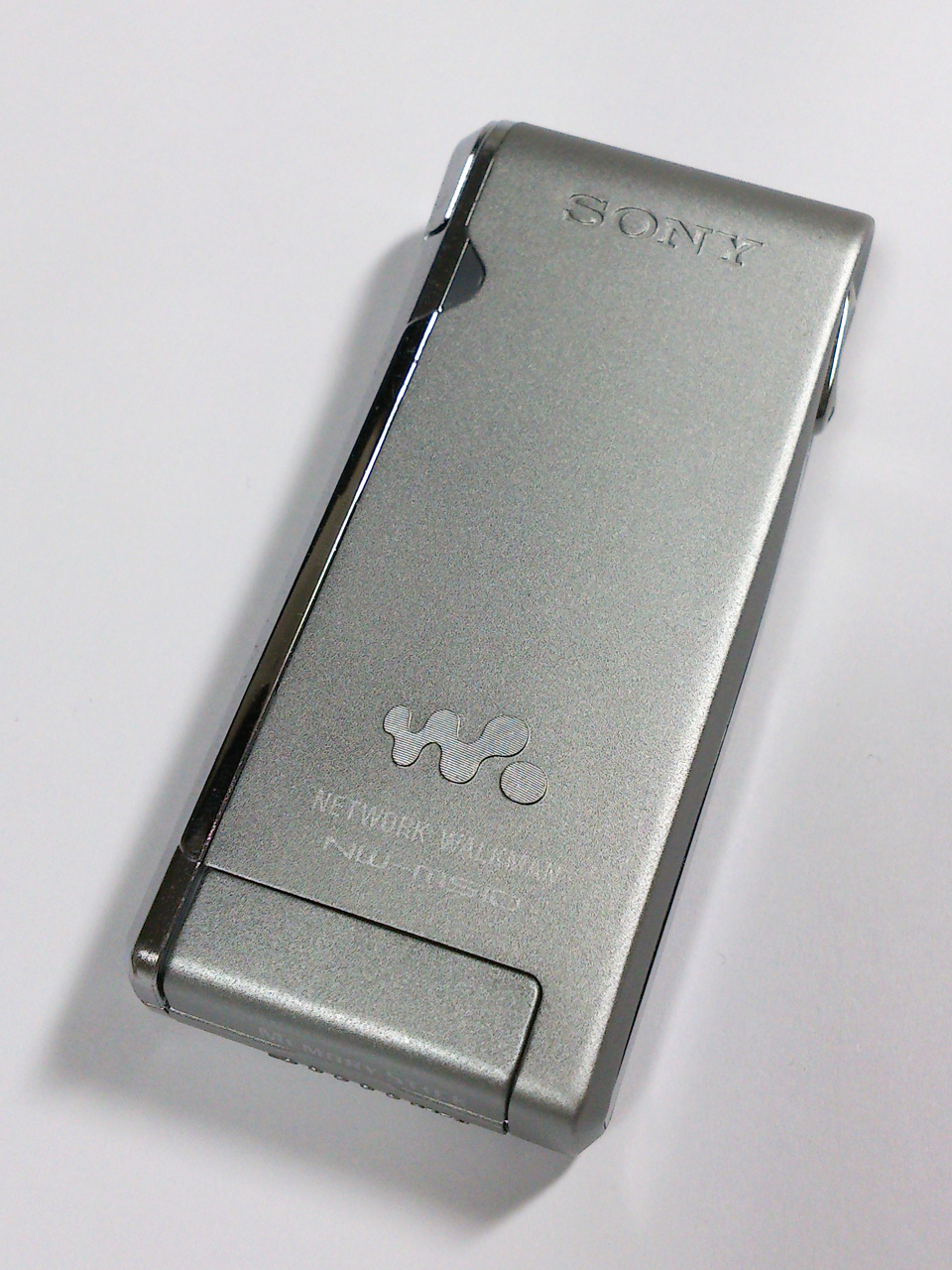
NW-MS10 (2002)

The Memory Stick-based Walkman was updated with the NW-MS9 and NW-MS11, with it now coming under the umbrella Network Walkman naming. These players came bundled with either 64 MB/128 MB MagicGate Memory Sticks and used a gumstick type battery. Software continued to use OpenMG. The NW-MS9 now had a thin metal body and had 64 MB of internal memory and was priced $330. Release in Japan of the MS9 was December 2000 and April 2001 in Europe. In Canada it was released in August 2001.

NW-MS11 was released in Japan in October 2001 and came with a 128 MB Memory Stick.

==== NW-MS70D/MS90D ====
The last Memory Stick-based Network Walkmans were released in 2002, although these new models also included internally embedded flash memory.

Model NW-MS70D had 256 MB of built-in flash memory. It could also be expanded by its MagicGate Memory Stick Duo port. However, at the time, the Memory Stick PRO Duo had not yet been released, so the maximum capacity remained at 384 MB with the additional memory stick. Another criticism was that it was incredibly expensive, priced equivalent to a 15 GB iPod. It also mandated the use of notoriously buggy software (SonicStage) and could only play music encoded as ATRAC3, ATRAC3Plus, or WAV. It was, however, the smallest digital audio player available at the time, termed "ultra compact" by Sony. It was also solidly built with an aluminium shell and a titanium finish. It had a 44-hour battery life.

Despite a heavy marketing campaign, sales of the memory stick models were limited. The devices were much more expensive than competing iRiver and Mpio players that did not require SonicStage or ATRAC transcoding. Inexpensive Zen and Muvo players from Creative Labs further hindered Sony's sales.

The alternate model, the NW-MS90D, used the same software as NW-MS70D, and had a maximum capacity of 640 MB. It, too, was extremely costly. The most conspicuous difference in the higher-numbered model was its 512 MB built-in memory and its new black shell. Due to its price and limited capacity, it was still largely ignored by the general public and shared the fate of its MS70D sister. Around this time and particularly with these models, the obligatory SonicStage software started to gain a negative reception.

The NW-MS70D, released in Europe in 2003, was the first device using Sony's Virtual Mobile Engine (VME) digital signal processor.

After the MS70D and MS90D, no more Memory Stick type Network Walkmans were released. Future Network Walkmans would only have embedded flash memory or hard disks.

=== Hard Disk Walkman ===
==== NW-HD1 ====
As Sony was losing market relevance amid the widespread success of Apple's iPod range, the company developed for the first time a hard disk-based player. The NW-HD1 was announced on June 30, 2004 dubbed as “the world's smallest portable audio device”. It was smaller and was advertised as having better sound quality than the iPod at the time. The HD1 featured a seven line 1.8 inch LED display and had a 20 GB hard disk. The device was brushed in high quality aluminum.

However, the unit would only play Sony's proprietary format, ATRAC3, whereas other players on the market would play the more open and much more widely used MP3 format without having to be converted to ATRAC3.

Sony did upgrade the HD1 to play MP3s but it still needed SonicStage to transfer the files. The NW-HD1 did not sell as well as Sony had hoped - its asking price of $399 was $100 more than a 20 GB iPod. Its successors, the NW-HD3 and NW-HD5, also failed to make a major dent in the iPod's sales.

==== NW-HD3 ====
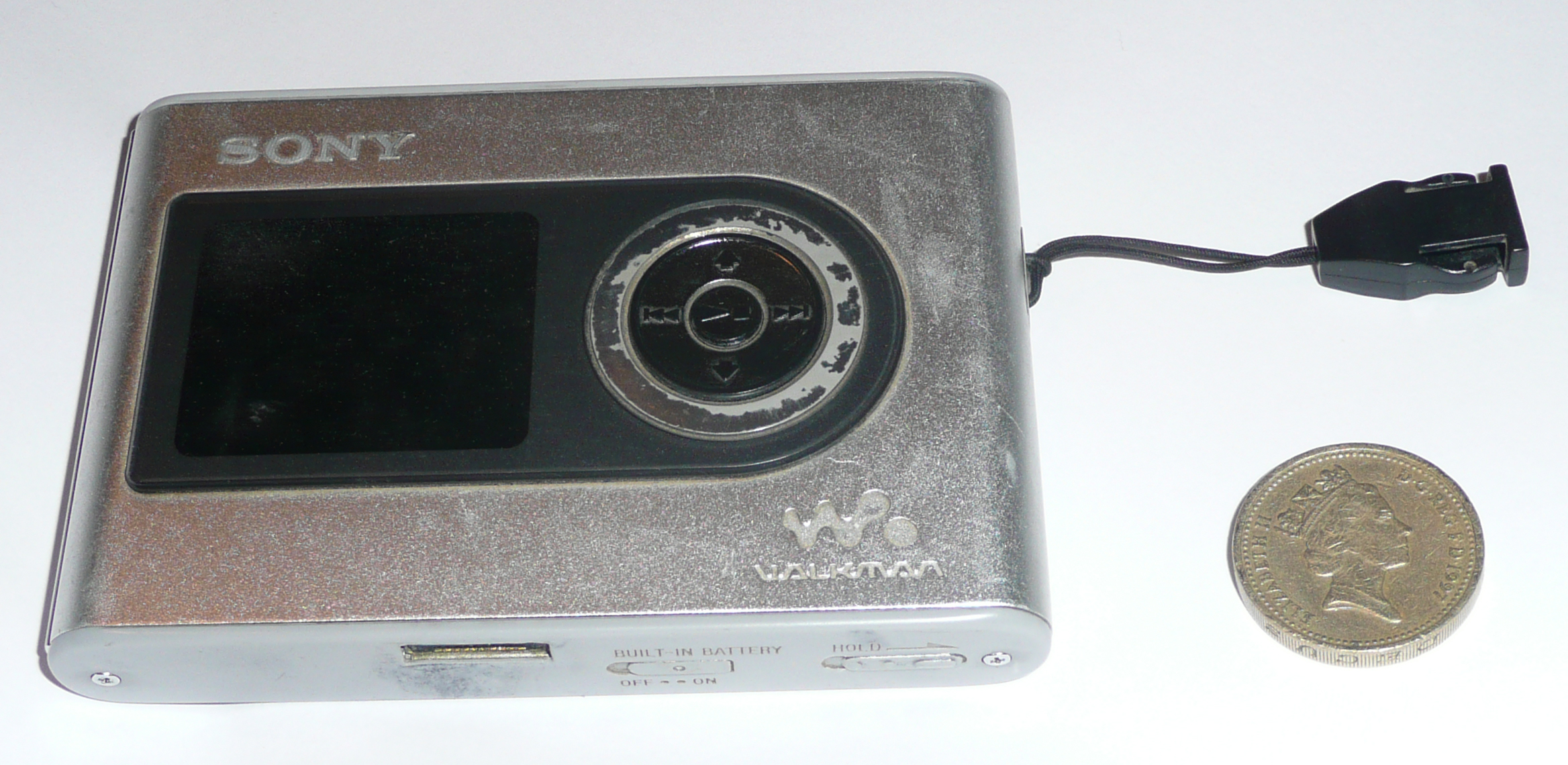
Sony Walkman NW-HD3, the first to support the MP3 format

The successor to the hard disk-based NW-HD1, the NW-HD3 was a very similar design, but it could now play MP3s natively. It was announced on November 30, 2004.

==== NW-HD5 ====
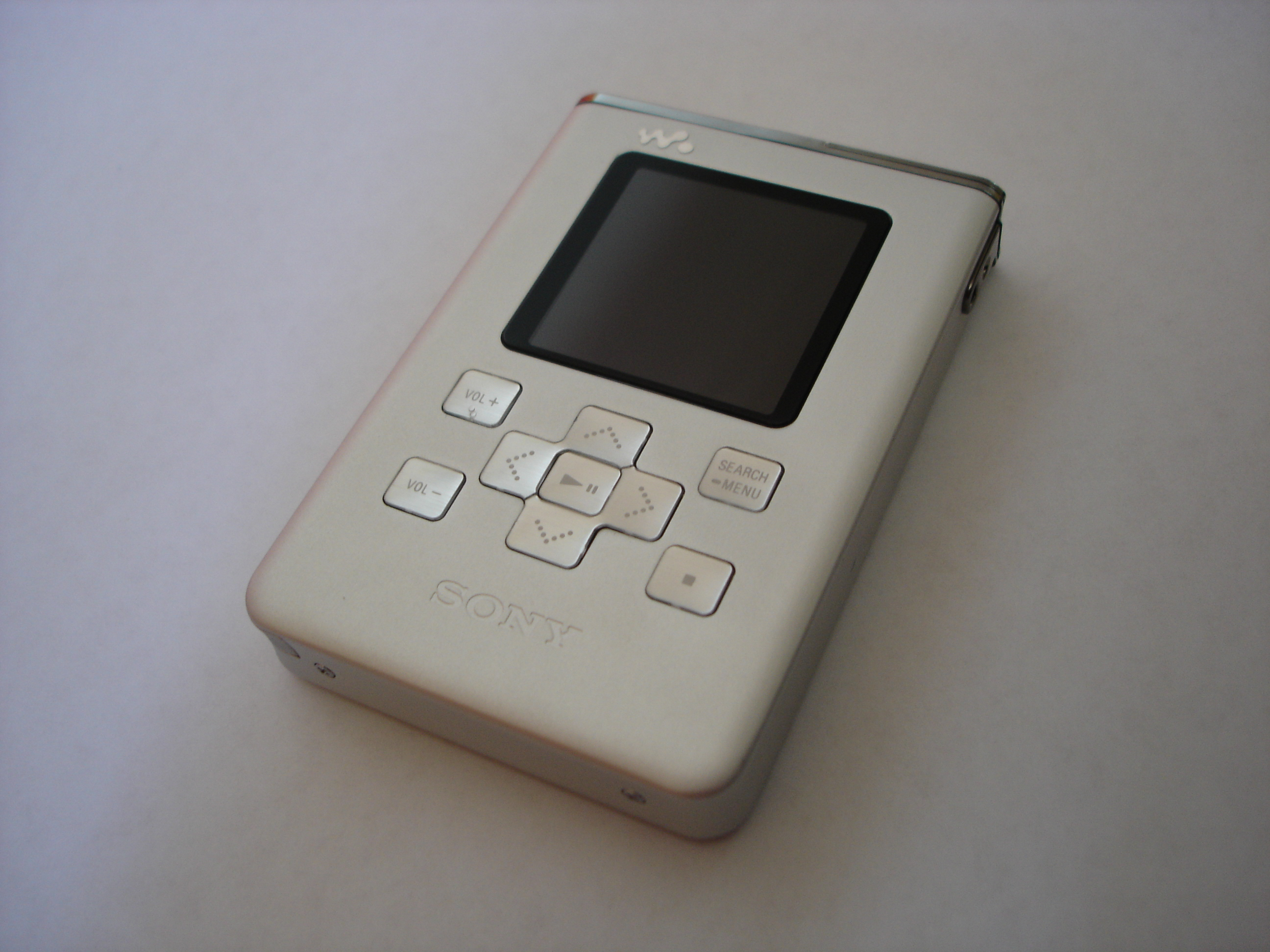
NW-HD5

Sony's next model, the NW-HD5, was announced in April 2005 and released July 2005 and was an updated design from the HD1 / HD3, boasting a simpler control system, an upright handheld format, a user-removable lithium-ion battery, better file format compatibility, a unique "Follow Turn Display" that would automatically align itself based on how the player was held on startup, and updated software. A main feature was its advertised running time of 40 hours, when using low-quality format settings, i.e., 48 kbit/s ATRAC3 files, and no player-based audio enhancements (although the player does include these). Playback of 128 kbit/s MP3s was rated at 30 hours. The player was available in black, silver and red and was not sold in the Canadian market. The NW-HD5 was in direct competition with the 4th generation iPod.

The NW-HD5 was shipped with a cosmetic design flaw which meant that the buttons developed small visible cracks under their plastic coating. Although this did not affect functionality, many customers complained. Sony United Kingdom Limited allowed owners to send the units back to be re-fitted with slightly raised, crack-resistant buttons. The NW-HD5 was on the market for a short time. The HD5 model was replaced by the A Series (NW-A3000 and NW-A1000) which was also hard disk based.

In January 2006, the NW-HD5 became unavailable as a normal purchase from retail electronics stores and was relegated to online auction sites and used-electronics warehouses as a consumer item.

=== A Series ===
The A Series was first introduced September 2005 as the top flagship range. Apart from the very first model, all of these are flash memory based players. Over the years, many generations have been produced which continue to this day.

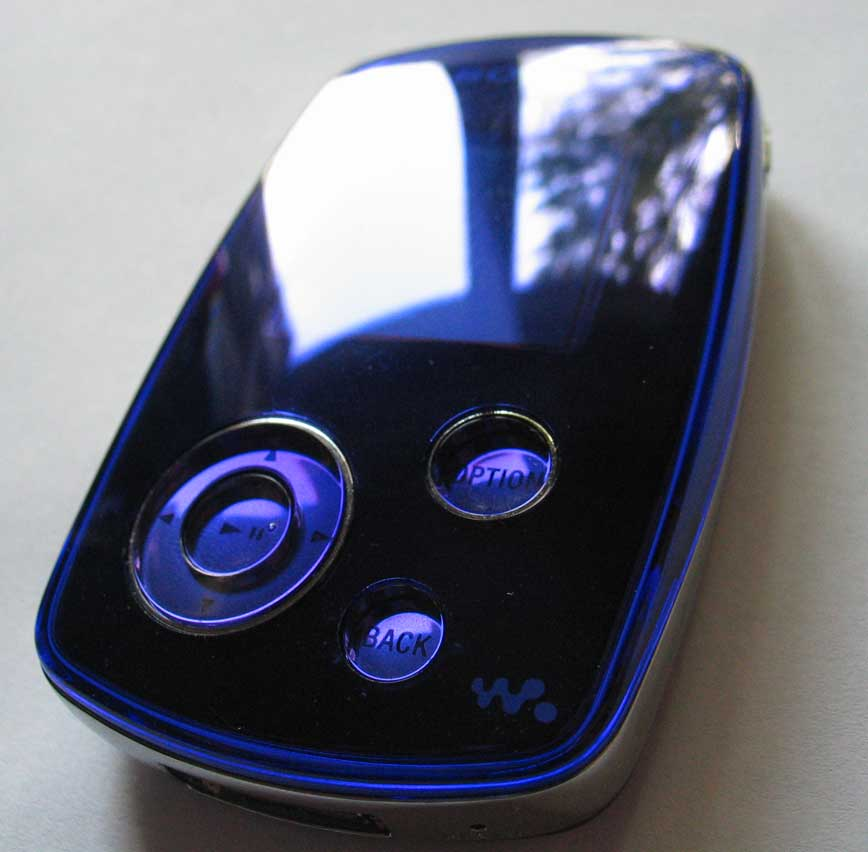
Sony NW-A1000 series, the final hard disk based Walkman (2005)

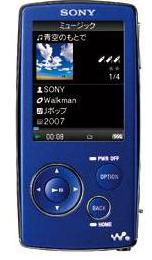
Sony NWZ-A800/A810 series (2007)

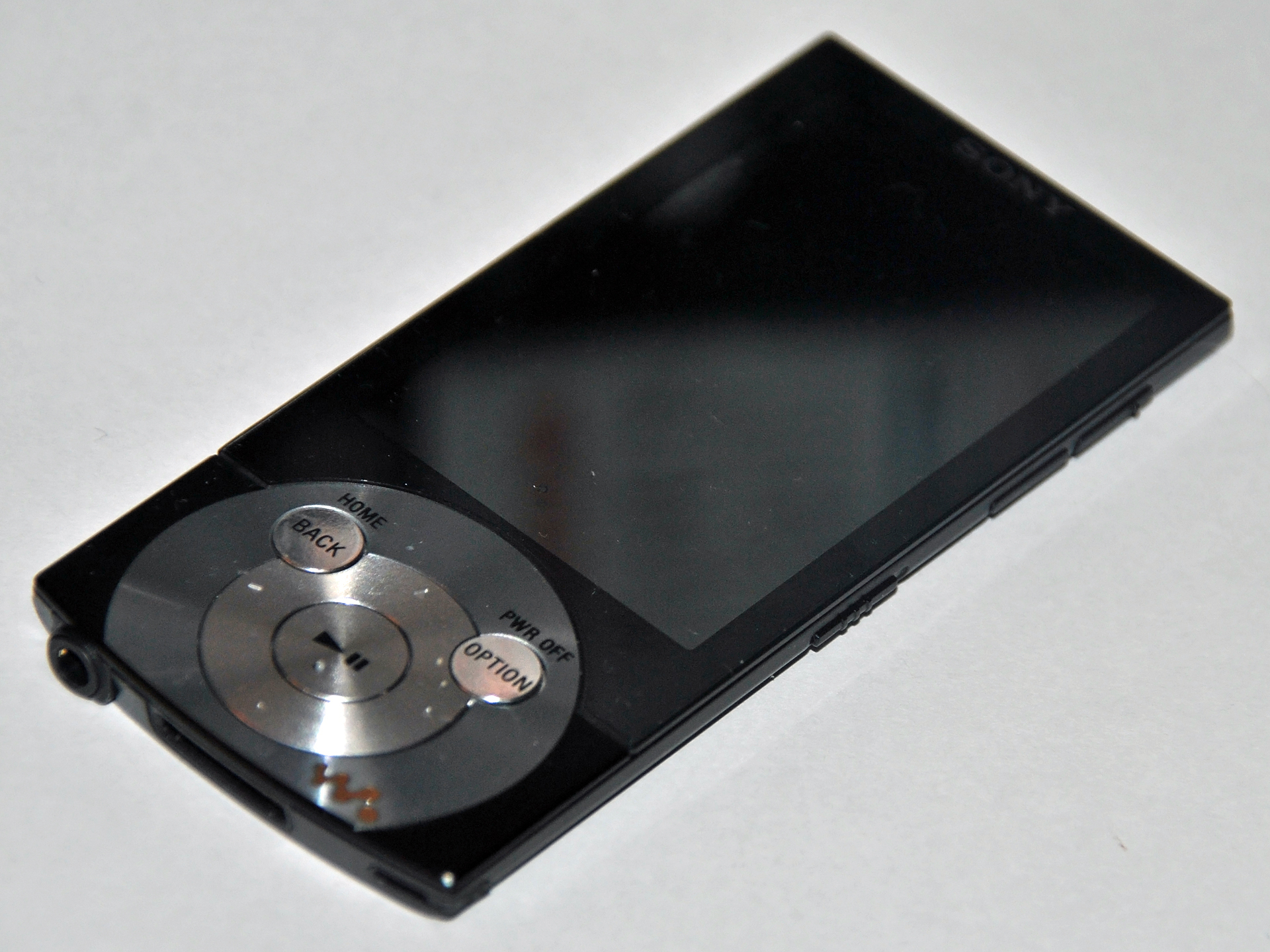
NWZ-A840 series (2009)

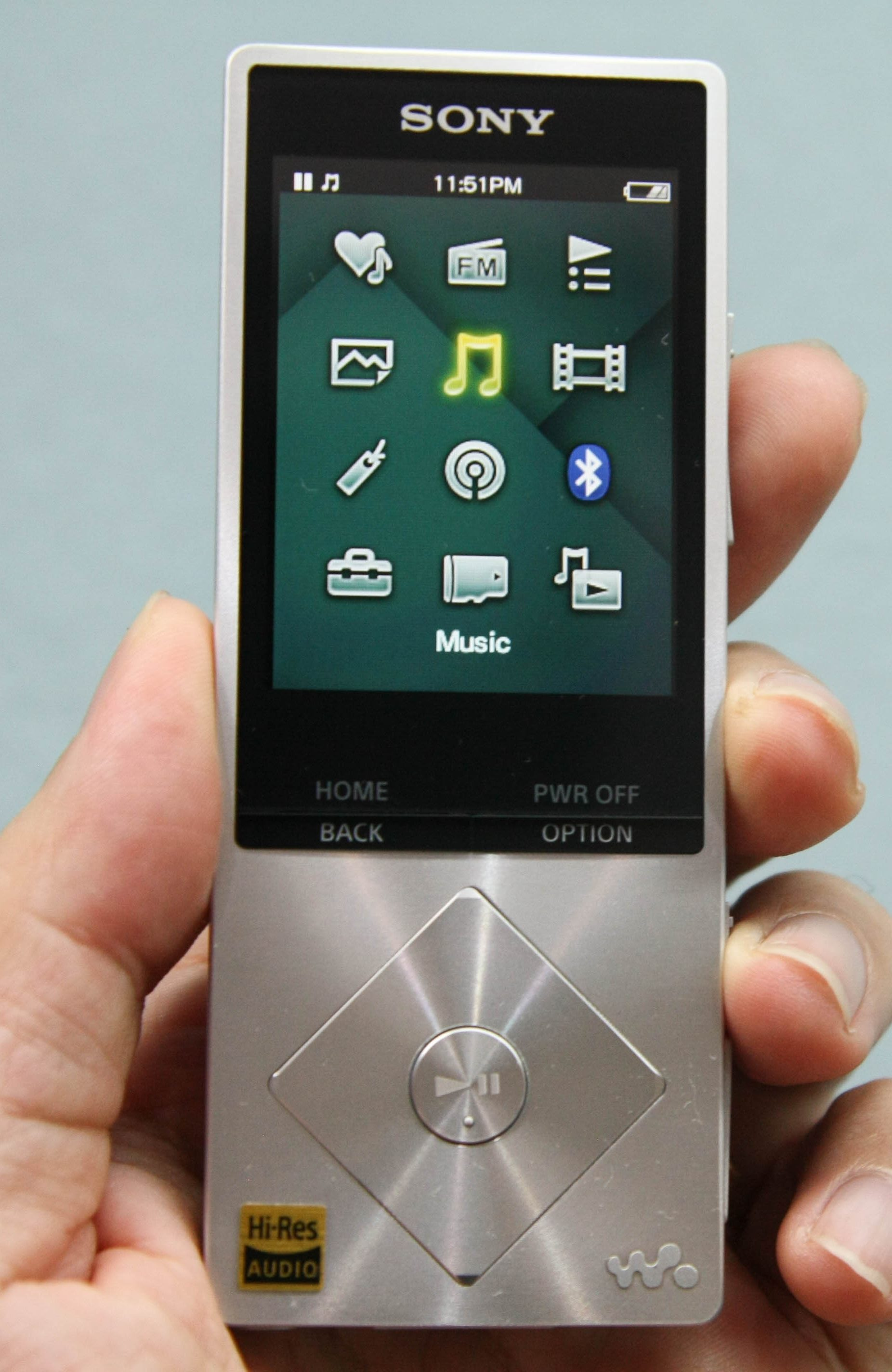
NWZ-A10 series (2014)

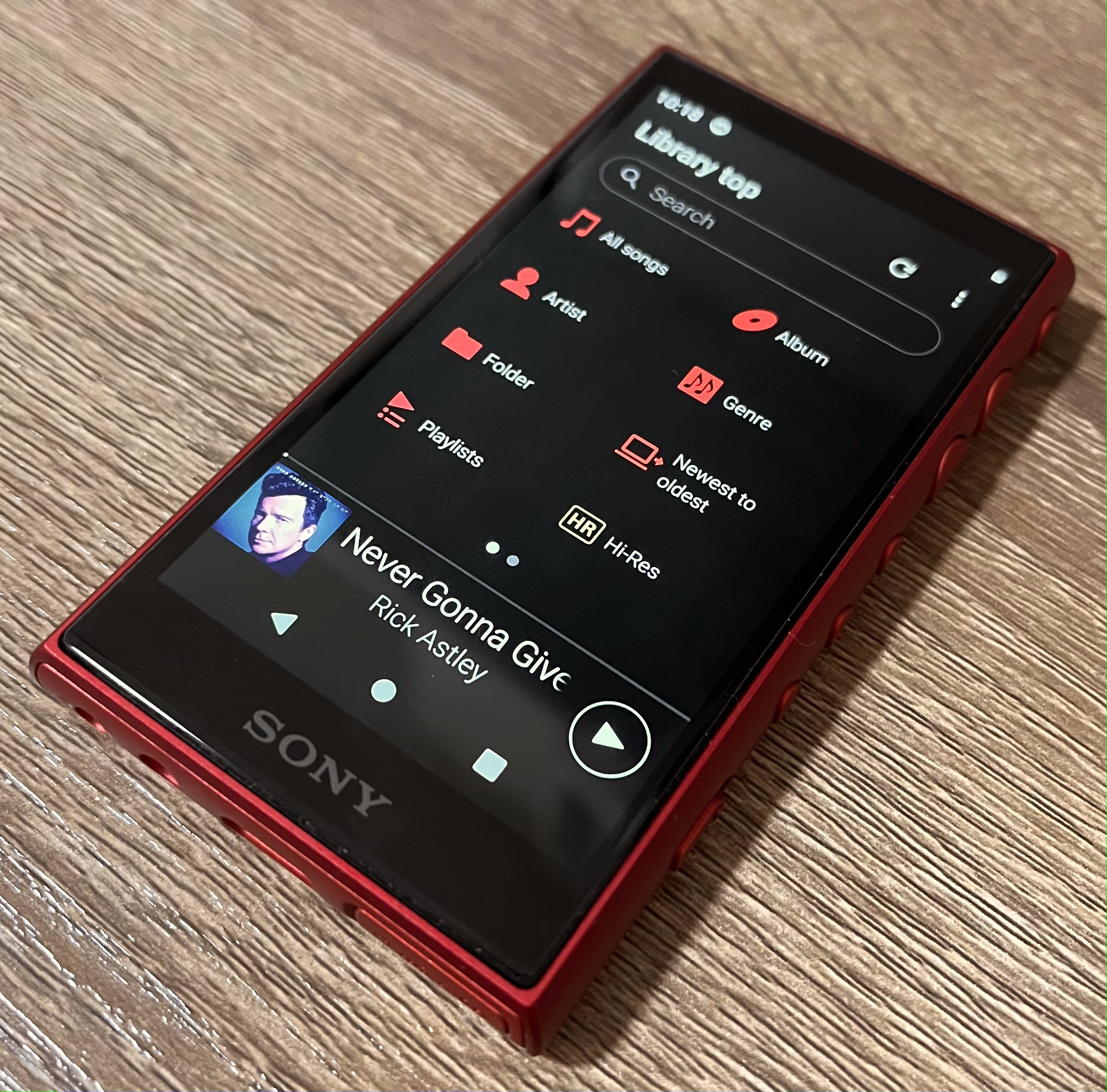
NW-A100 series (2019)

=== B Series ===
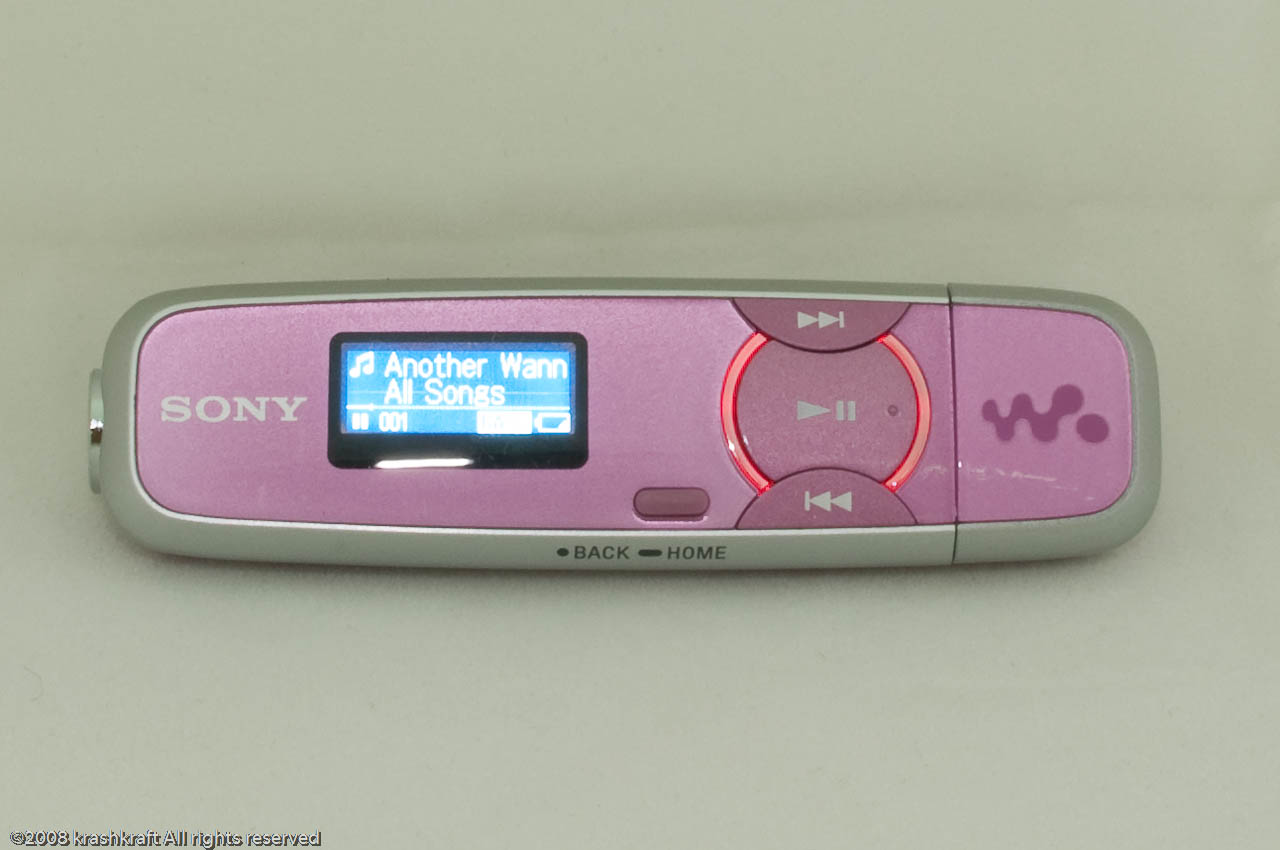
NWZ-B135F/P (2008)

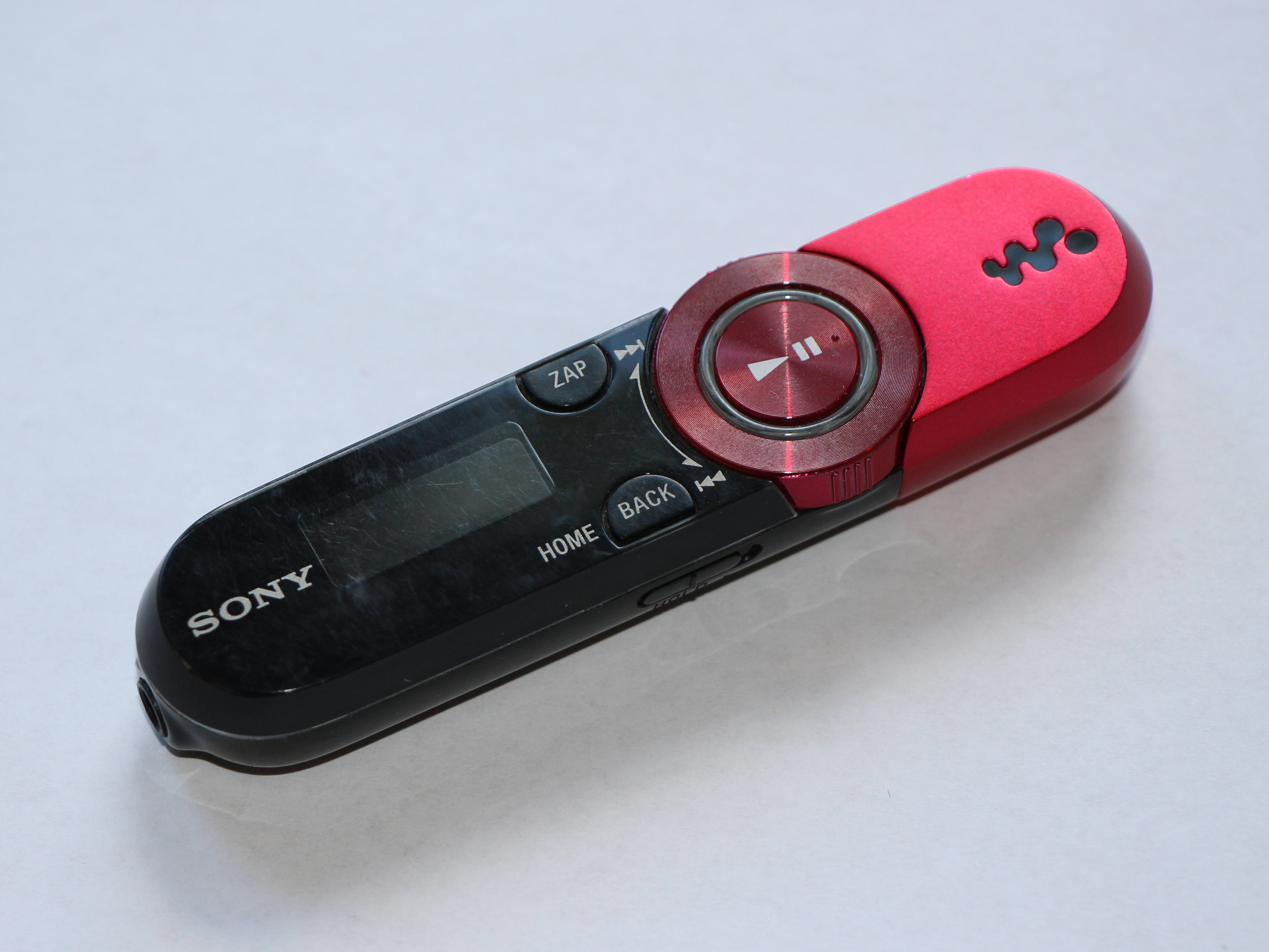
NWZ-B163FR (2011)

The B Series are ultra portable, entry-level, USB thumb drive style players for the overseas market. The original series, the B100 released in July 2007, was a line of 1 GB (NWD-B103/B103F) and 2 GB (NWD-B105/105F) multifunction MP3 player and voice recording function. It was the first Walkman digital music player to not require SonicStage software - allowing simple drag and drop - but it has been shorn of the ability to play back ATRAC and AAC music files.

The Auto-Transfer option allowed this Walkman to search for all the MP3 files on the PC and then copy these files directly to the Walkman. It also could record CDs directly from a Sony compatible Hifi system via USB connection without any PC (the NWD-B105 also supported WMA files). It also came with a three-line colour display; the voice recorder (MP3) came with bit rates of low (96 kbit/s), mid (128 kbit/s) and high. Models with the built-in FM tuner ("F") had 30 preset stations with a frequency of 87.5–108.0 MHz, with the capability to record and play FM content. The five preset equaliser also had a custom setting option.

In September 2008, its successor the NWZ-B130 series was launched.

The NWZ-B140 was introduced in 2009 featuring the ZAPPIN song search technology which it inherited from the NWZ-W202 player. The NWZ-B150 series was introduced in April 2010 with a 3 line LCD.

The B160 series was introduced in June 2011. These were followed by B170 series in early 2012, and the current series, B180, in April 2014. The B180 series consists of one 4 GB model, NWZ-B183, and its FM radio variant NWZ-B183F, and has 20 hours of battery life.

=== E Series ===
The E Series were the very first to be branded Network Walkman in 2000, shortly after the Memory Stick Walkman. They started out as lightweight, portable, gumstick style music players, before turning into budget-oriented candybar style players with colour displays.

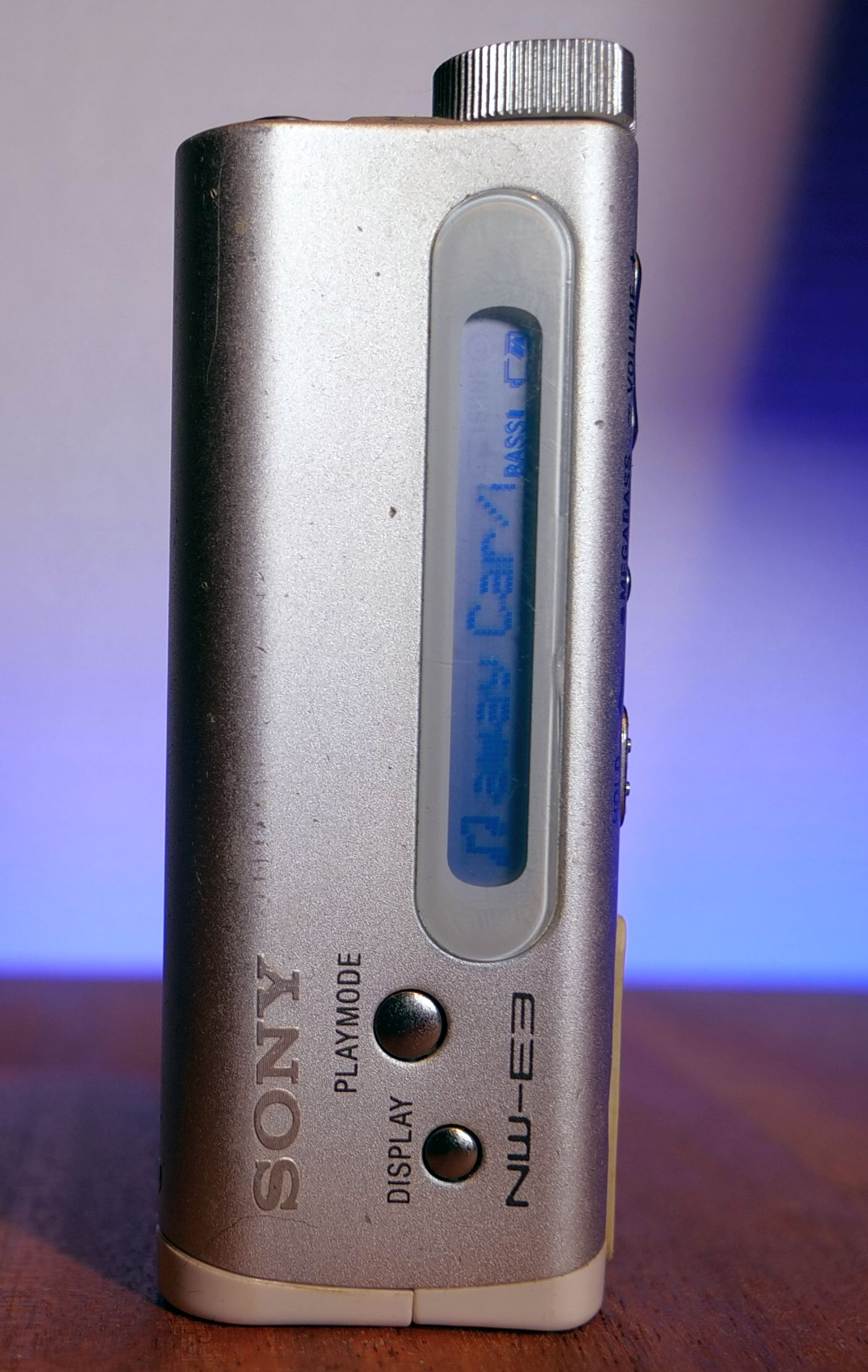
Sony NW-E3 (2000)

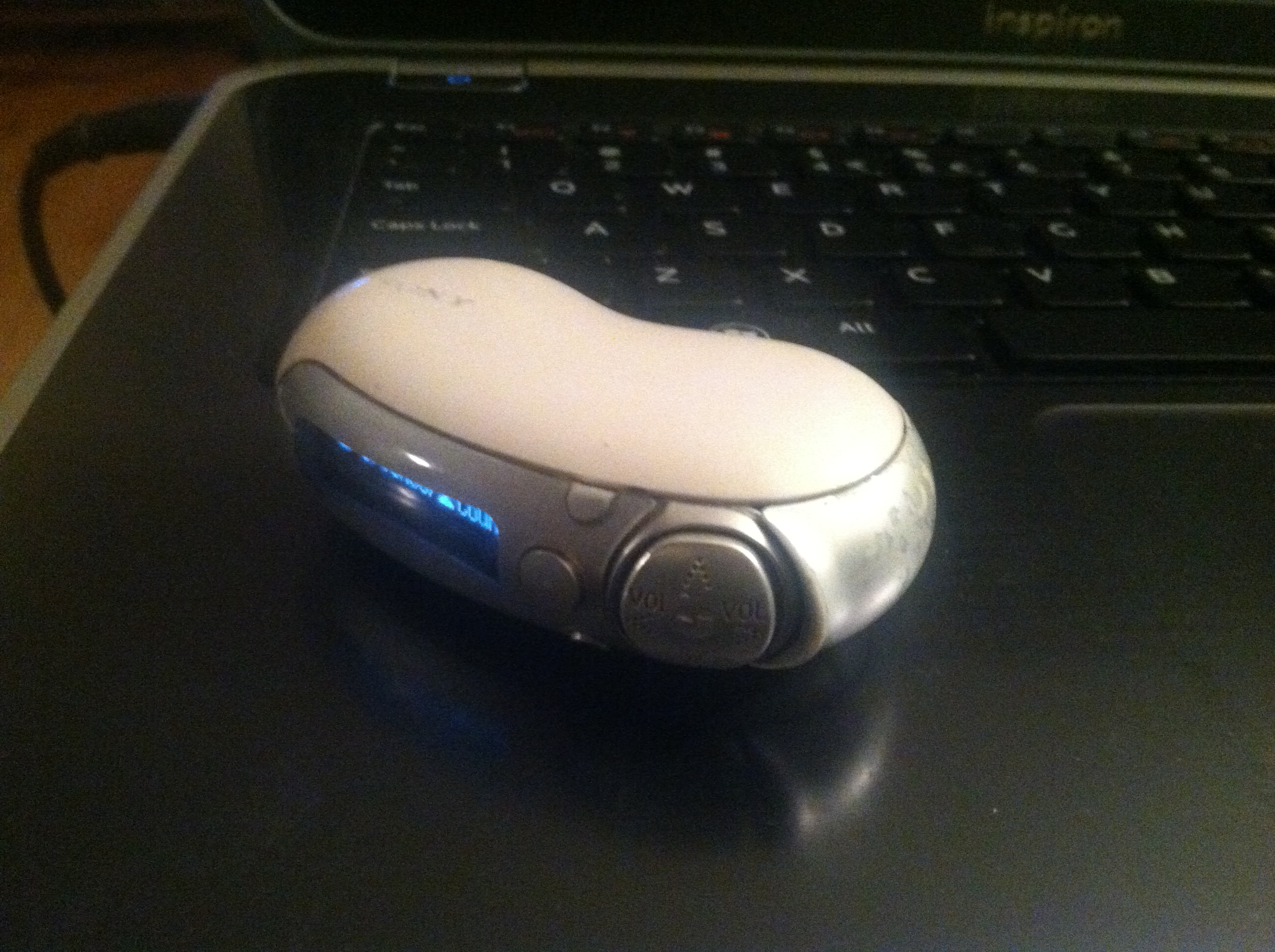
Sony NWZ-E300/E200 series (2005)

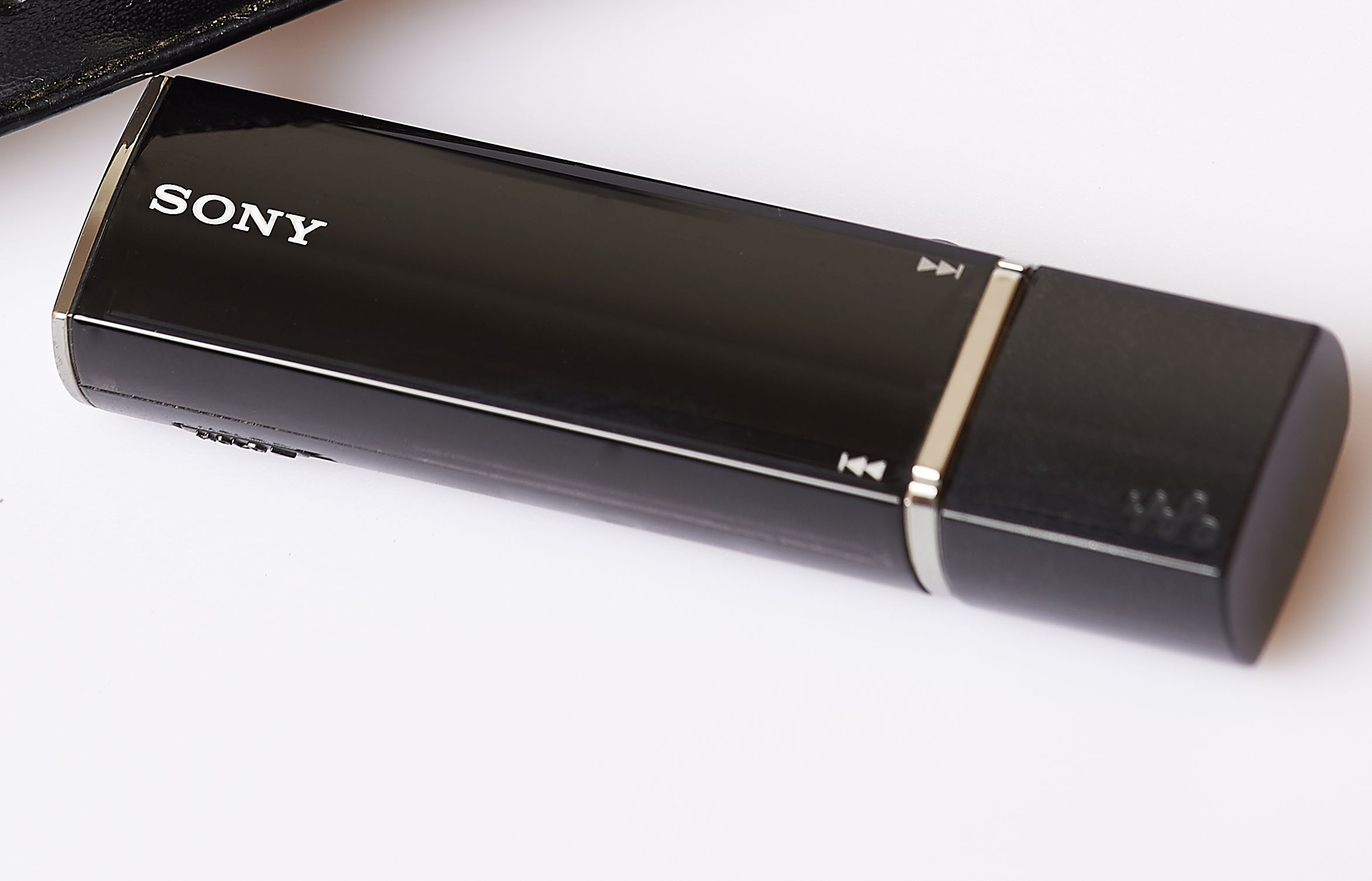
Sony NWZ-E010 series (2007)

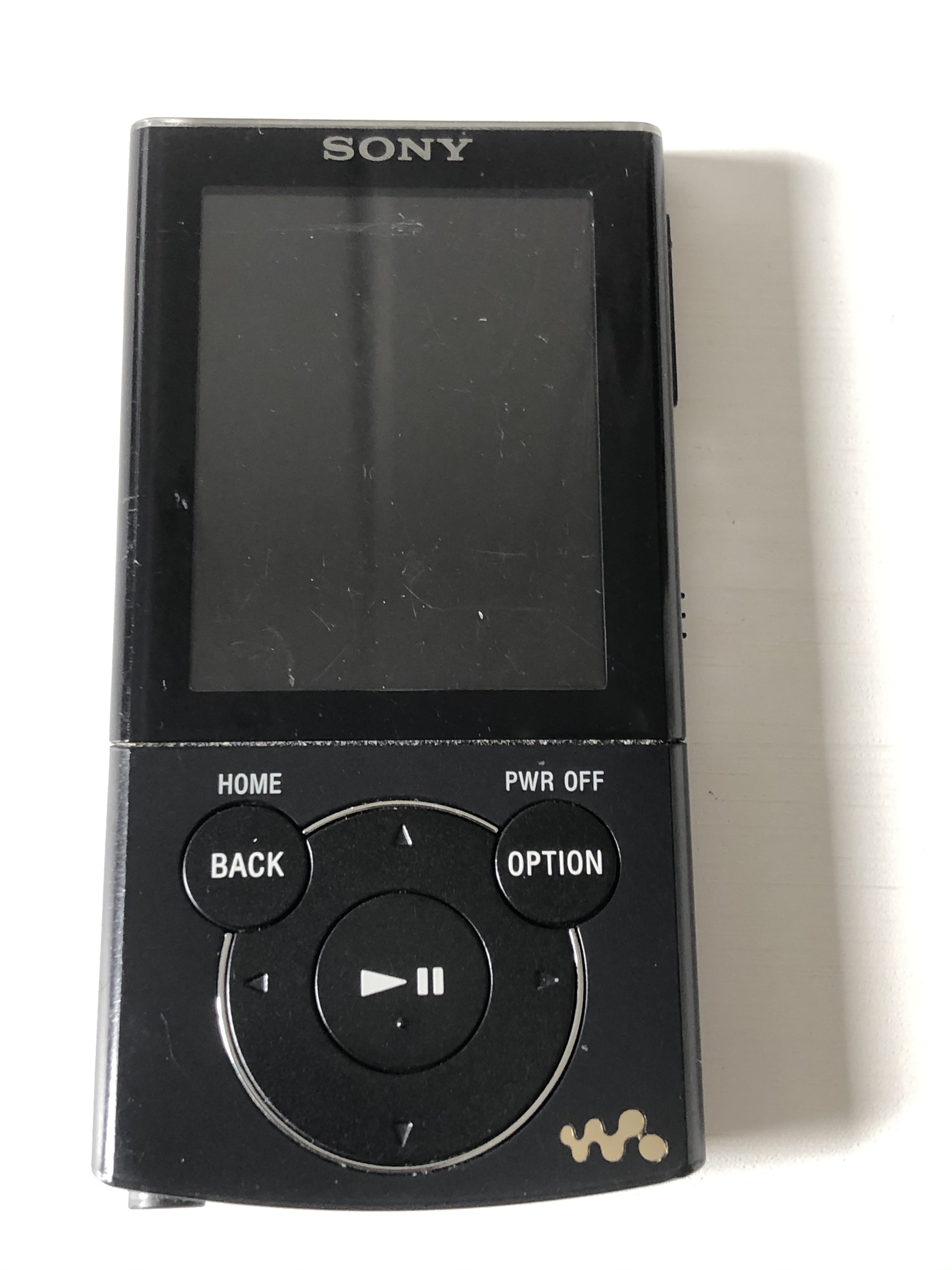
Sony NWZ-E440 series (2009)

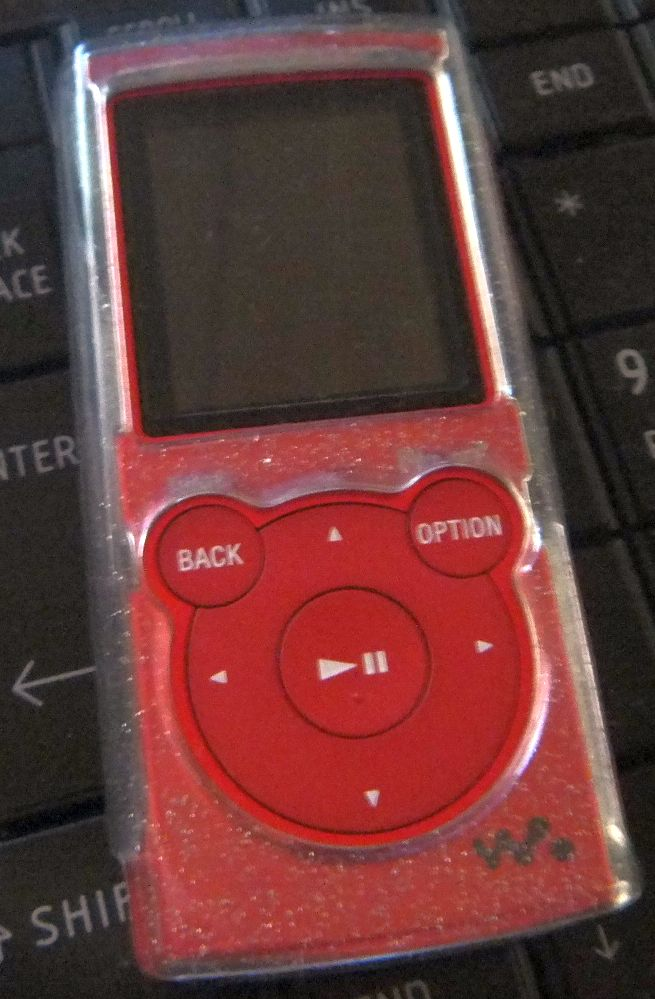
Sony NW-E060 series (2012)

=== F Series ===
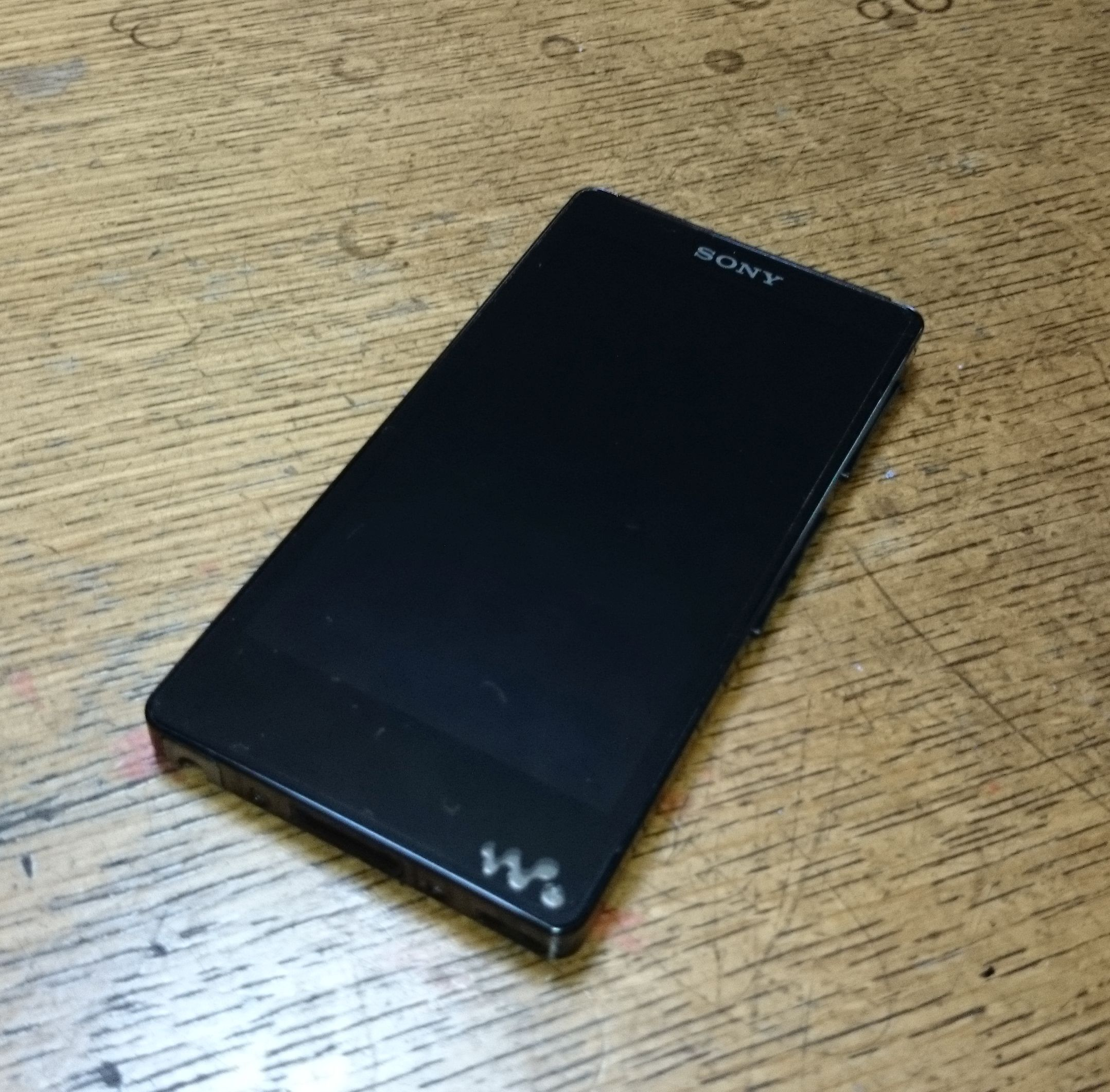
NW-F887 (2013)

The F Series was introduced in 2012 as the replacement of the Z Series. They are portable media players running the Android operating system. The first series, F800, came with Android Ice Cream Sandwich software and was also the first Sony Walkman to support the FLAC format.

=== M Series ===

The M Series (sole model NW-M505) is a small thumb drive styled player released in Japan in December 2013 for 18,000 yen. The M Series is similar to the E Series except that it is metallic, more expensive, a higher build quality, and features noise cancelation, S-Master MX amp, NFC, Bluetooth with aptX, and a microphone for hands-free phone. In addition changing songs has a twisting "shuttle switch" like the older E400/E500/A600 Series instead of buttons. In Japan it was released in 4 colors topping out at 16 gigabytes (NW-M505). It was released in Europe in late 2014 but only came in black and 8 gigabytes (NWZ-M504). It was also released that year in the Pacific Asia region. No successors were released in the series.

=== S Series ===
Sony used the "S2 Sports" brand from other Walkman types for certain fitness-friendly small Network Walkman players. The NW-S4 Sports Network Walkman had a sleek pen shape and a sporty water resistant design and came with an arm strap and 64 megabyte of embedded flash memory. It was released in April 2001 for $200. Later in 2004, the NW-S23 S2 Sports Network Walkman was released with 256 MB internal flash memory. A 128 MB version called NW-S21 was also released.

After 2006, the S Series was repurposed and a wide range of players have been released to this day.

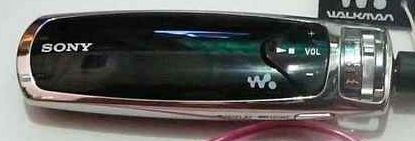
Sony NW-S700 series (2006)

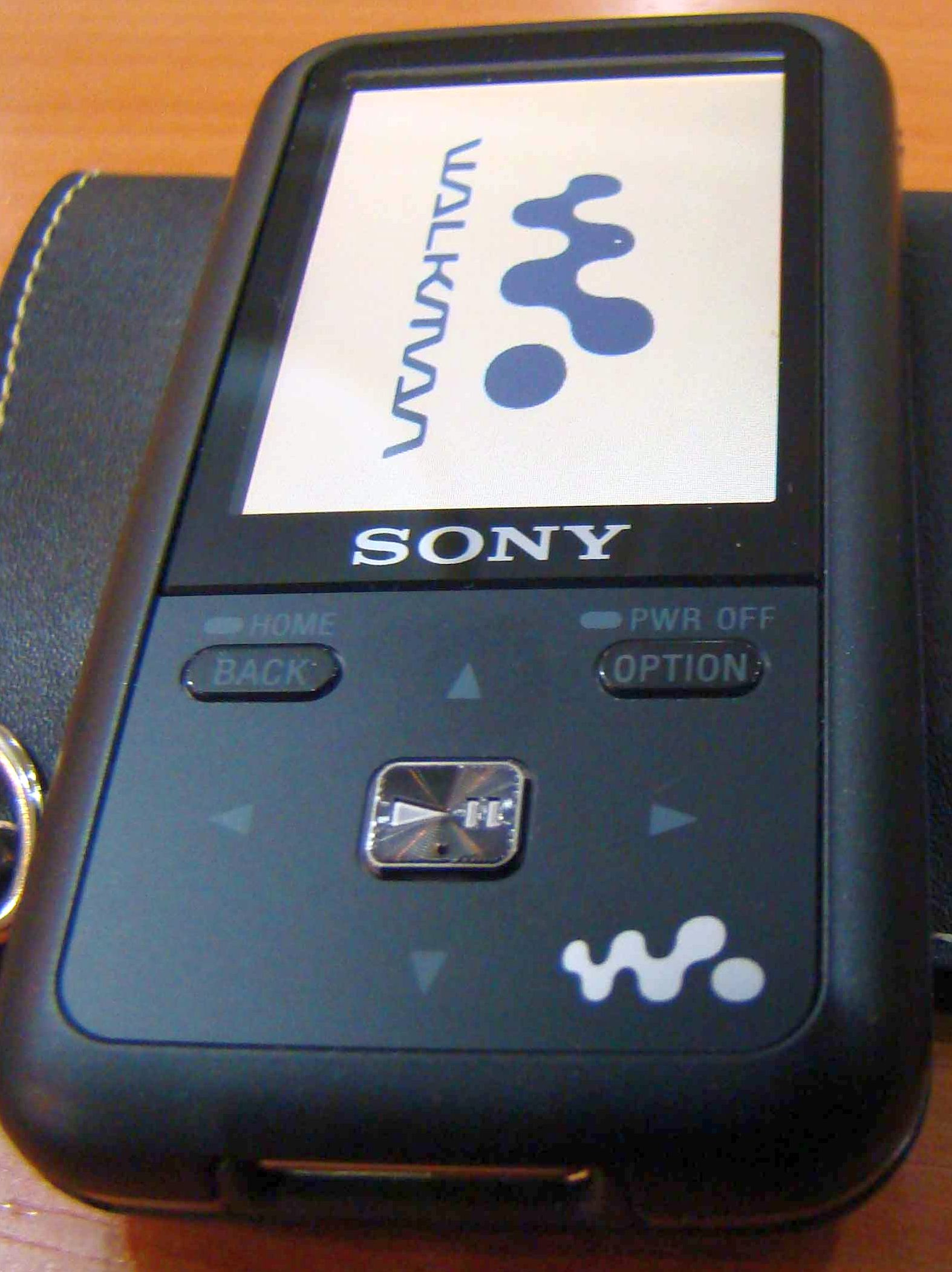
Sony NWZ-S610 series (2007)

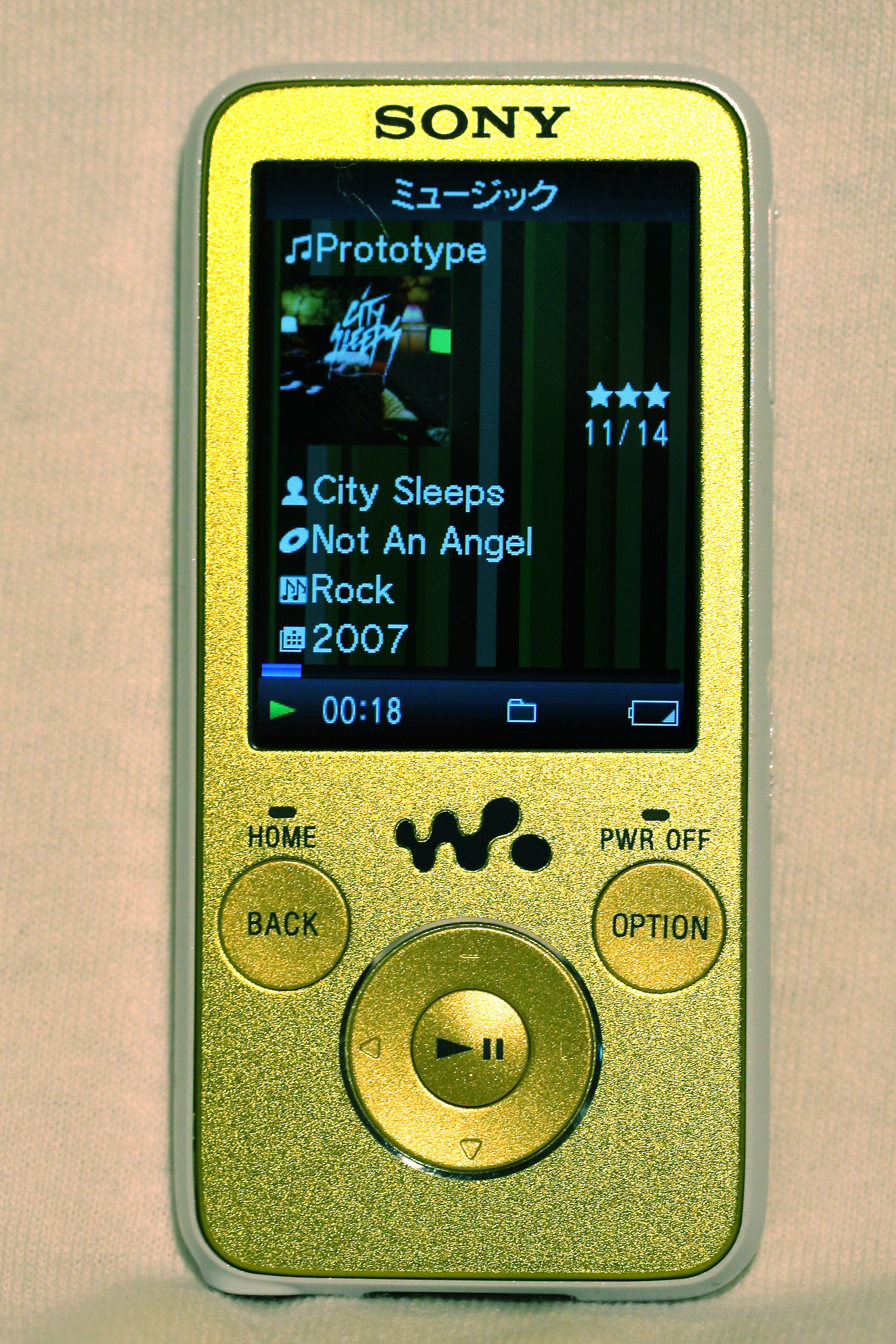
Sony NWZ-S630 series (2008)

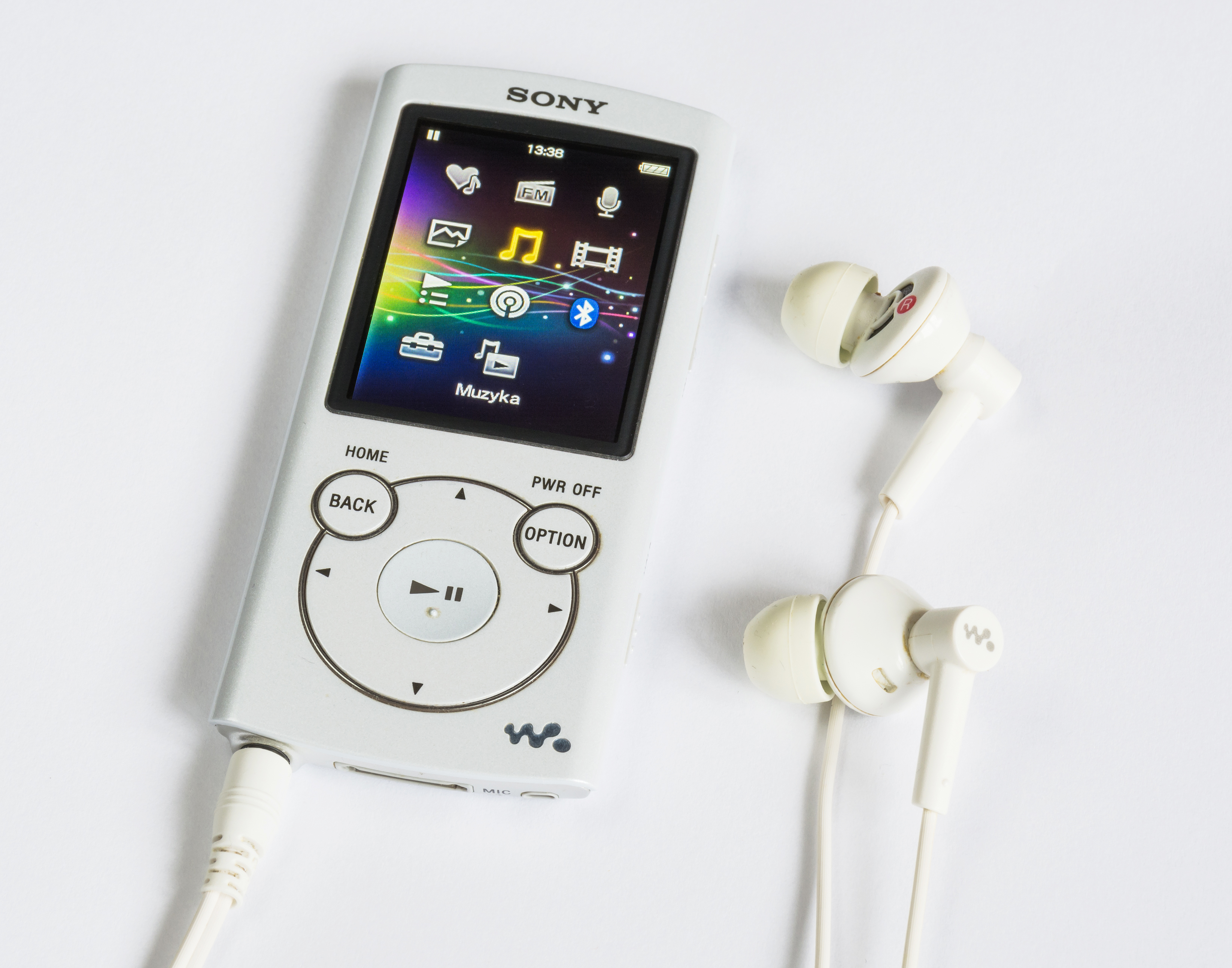
Sony NWZ-S760 series (2011)

=== W Series ===
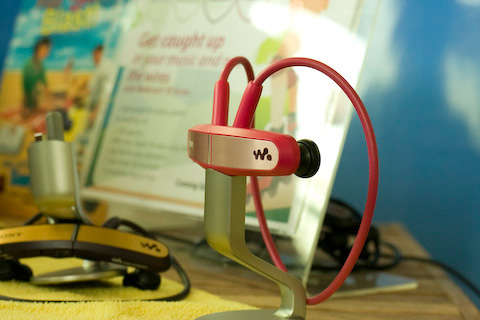
A wearable Walkman from the W series

The W series (Wearable) is a wearable music player built into a set of headphones. The original model, the NWZ-W202 was released in 2009 and had 2 GB of internal memory and could play 11 hours of music and can "quick-charge" for three minutes to yield up to 90 minutes of playback. It can play back MP3, AAC (unprotected only), and WMA (subscription included) files. It was the first Walkman with Zappin, a Sony function which allows the user to browse through tracks by playing a snippet of the chorus of each song.

The original model was followed by the W250 series coming in 2 GB (NW-W253) and 4 GB (NW-W254) capacities. In July 2011 the W260 series was introduced which is significantly smaller and lighter.

The W270 series, which is fully waterproof, was released in April 2013. Model NW-W273 has 4 GB internal memory and NW-W274 has 8 GB. Later that year the NW-WH505 and NW-WH303 were introduced, which is a music player combined into a conventional headphone. A higher end variant of the W270, called WS615, features 16 GB of memory, Bluetooth and NFC.

In January 2016, the WS410 series (WS413 and WS414) were announced with a new salt water and dust proof design, and an Ambient Sound feature.

The successor to the WS610 series was released in 2017 as WS620, coming in 16 GB (NW-WS625) and 4 GB (NW-WS623) capacities. Like the WS410, it has improvements in salt water and dust resistance, and it also now has the ability to play FLAC audio files.

=== WM1 Series ===

Introduced at IFA 2016, the NW-WM1A is a top-end portable media player retailing for €1200, and has 128 GB internal memory. A gold plated edition called NW-WM1Z was also released, retailing for €3300 as part of Sony's Signature Series. Model NW-WM1Z had 256 GB of storage

Models NW-WM1AM2 and NW-WM1ZM2 were introduced in February 2022, with Android replacing Sony's own operating system. It also had a USB-C port replacing the proprietary WM-Port for data connection.

Model	Image	Capacity	Release date	Display	Rated battery life	OS
NW-WM1A		128 GB	2016	4" (10.2 cm) 854 × 480 (FWVGA)	33 Hour (MP3 128 kbps); 30 Hour (FLAC 96 kHz/24 bit); 26 Hour (FLAC 192 kHz/24 bit); 11 Hour (DSD 11.2 MHz)	Custom
NW-WM1Z		256 GB	2016	4" (10.2 cm) 854 × 480 (FWVGA)	33 Hour (MP3 128 kbps); 30 Hour (FLAC 96 kHz/24 bit); 26 Hour (FLAC 192 kHz/24 bit); 11 Hour (DSD 11.2 MHz)	Custom
NW-WM1AM2		128 GB	2022	5" 12.7 cm 1280 × 720 (TFT LCD)	MP3 (128kbps) / Stereo mini-jack: Approx. 40 hrs, MP3 (128 kbps) / Balanced standard-jack: Approx. 40 hrs, FLAC (96 kHz / 24bit) / Stereo mini-jack: Approx. 40 hrs, FLAC (96 kHz / 24bit) / Balanced standard-jack: Approx. 40 hrs, FLAC (192 kHz / 24bit) / Stereo mini-jack: Approx. 35 hrs, FLAC (192 kHz / 24bit) / Balanced standard-jack: Approx. 35 hrs, DSD (2.8224 MHz / 1bit) / Stereo mini-jack: Approx. 25 hrs, DSD (2.8224 MHz / 1bit) / Balanced standard-jack: Approx. 15 hrs, DSD (5.6448 MHz / 1bit) / Stereo mini-jack: Approx. 18 hrs, DSD (5.6448 MHz / 1bit) / Balanced standard-jack: Approx. 13 hrs	Android
NW-WM1ZM2		256 GB	2022	5" 12.7 cm 1280 × 720 (TFT LCD)		Android

=== X Series ===
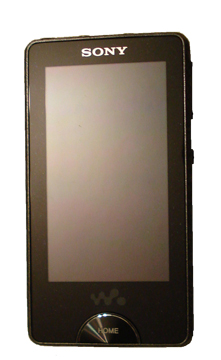
Walkman X Series (2009)

The Sony Walkman X series was a touchscreen audio and video player that was on the market from 2009 to 2010, designed to compete against the iPod Touch. It has a 3-inch (76 mm) OLED touch screen, internet access through Wi-Fi and digital noise-cancelling as well as applications for Slacker and YouTube. It was available in 16 GB and 32 GB versions. No revisions of the X Series were made; it was replaced by the Z Series.

=== Z Series ===
The Z1000, introduced September 2011, was the first Walkman product using the Android operating system.

=== ZX Series ===
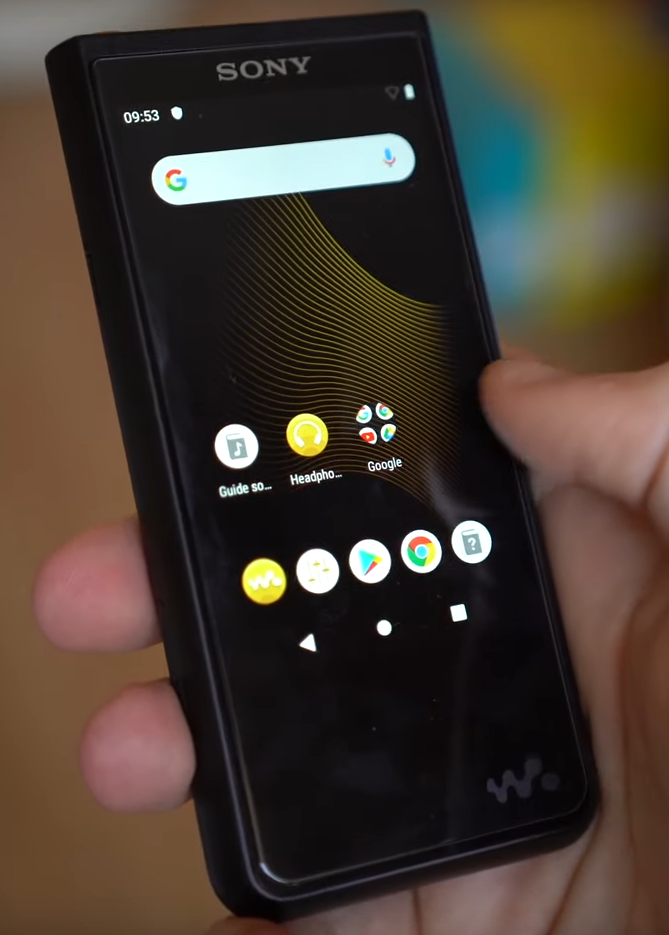
The NW-ZX507 (2019)

The ZX Series is a high-end Walkman player. Some of these run on Android software rather than Sony's own operating system.

== Sony Ericsson Walkman / Walkman Phone ==
Between 2005 and 2011, Walkman-branded mobile phones from Sony Ericsson were released. These were mobile phones with extra emphasis on music playback. The first such device was the W800, and the last device that used Walkman branding was Sony Ericsson Live with Walkman.

Walkman-branded mobile phones by Sony Ericsson were first released to Japan in 2006, under partnership with operator KDDI (owned by au). The first model was the W42S 3G phone in 2006 with 1 GB internal memory and expansion with Memory Stick Pro DUO. It was marketed as the "Walkman Phone". It could download music directly to the handset without PC connection using KDDI's web music store. Succeeding models were released called Walkman Phone W52S, Walkman Phone Xmini (W65S), and Walkman Phone Premier3.

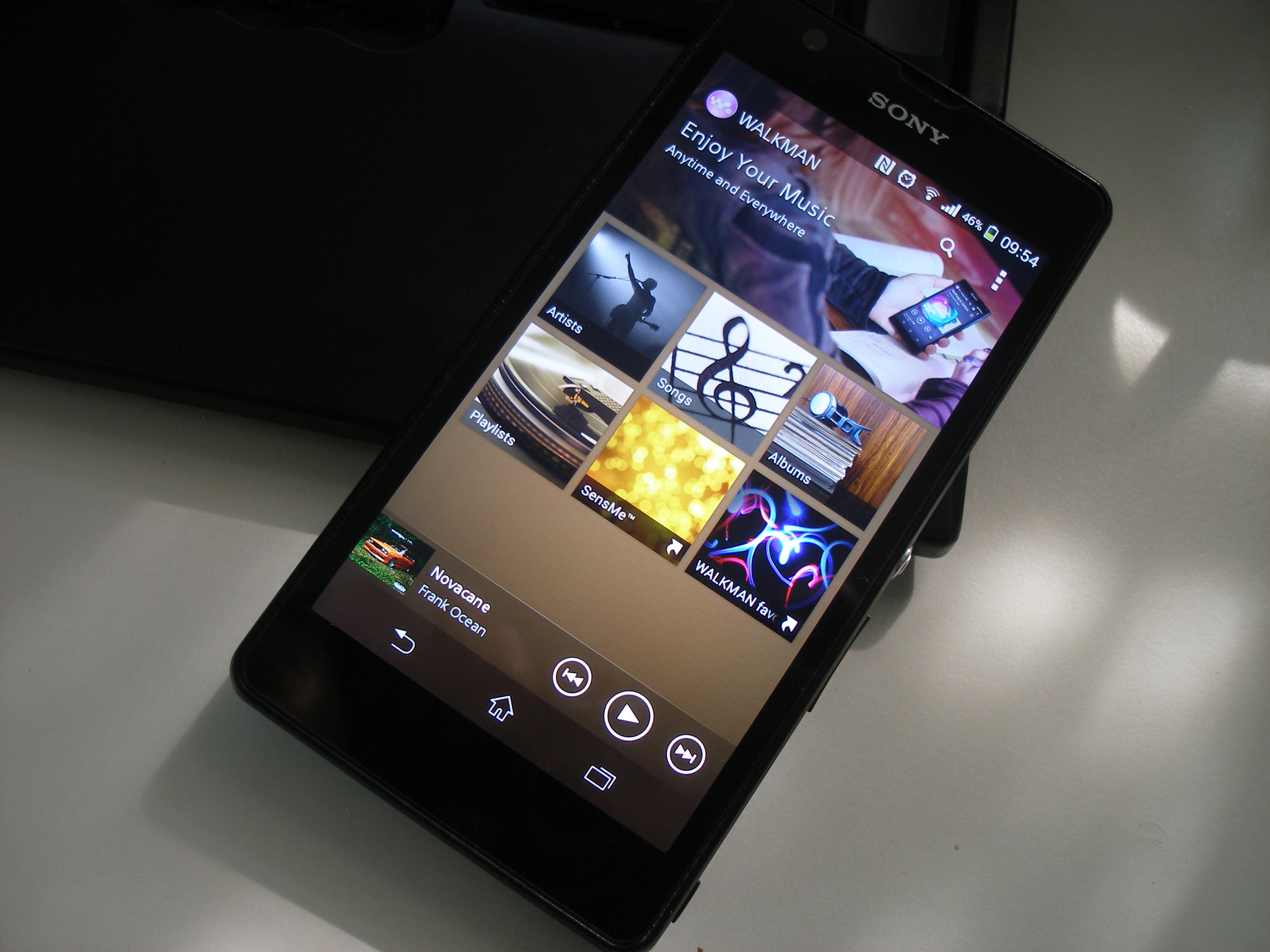
The Walkman app on a Sony Xperia ZR

After Sony's mobile division ceased to be a joint venture in 2012, Sony Xperia smartphones from 2012 to 2015 came with a Walkman-branded Music application.

- Sony Ericsson closed system
  - 2005－W800i, W900i, W550i
  - 2006－W810i, W700i, W300i, W710i, W850i, W950i, W42S (Japan)
  - 2007－W200i, W580i, W610i, W880i, W660i, W910i, W960i, W52S (Japan)
  - 2008－W380i, W890i, W350i, W980, W760i, W595, W902, SO905i (Japan)
  - 2009－W508, W705, W395, W995, W205, Premier3 (Japan), Xmini (W65S)(Japan)
  - 2010－Spiro (W100i), Zylo (W20), Yendo (W150i)
  - 2011－Mix (WT13i)
- OMS system
  - 2011－WT18
- Android intelligence system
  - 2011－W8 (E16i), Live (WT19)
  - 2014 - Xperia E1

== Special editions ==
Sony has partnered with various companies, brands, and music bands to release special Walkman digital audio players (most exclusive to Japan). Below are some editions:

- Franz Ferdinand black colored A Series (A1000) in January 2006 in Japan (only 100 manufactured)
- Disney Hannah Montana pink colored E Series released in Christmas 2009
- Metal Gear Solid: Peace Walker limited edition W Series (W253) released in 2010 in Japan and the United States.
- Disney Christmas Edition S Series (S760) released in Japan in Christmas 2010 with Mickey and Minnie Mouse decals and silicon case
- Disney limited edition S Series (S770) with Disney characters released in Japan in September 2012
- The Gazette limited edition F Series and S Series in Japan in August 2014
- Final Fantasy XV A Series (A30HN) released in Japan in 2016
- Naruto A Series (A25) "Naruto vs. Sasuke Final Battle" with branded headphones released in Singapore in 2016
- Kingdom Hearts III limited edition A Series (A55) including branded headphones, released in Japan in February 2019
- Hatsune Miku limited edition S Series (S310K) released in Japan in May 2019
- Love Live! Sunshine!! limited edition A Series (A55) released in Japan in May 2019
- Ghostbusters 35th anniversary Walkman released in the United States in July 2019, only 100 units manufactured
- Moomin limited edition A Series (A55) in Japan in October 2019
- Disney Frozen 2 limited edition A Series (A55) released in Japan in November 2019
- Disney, Peanuts, and Rilakkuma limited edition A Series (A105) released in Japan in November 2019.
- Saekano the Movie: Finale limited edition A Series (A55) released in Japan in January 2020
- Demon Slayer: Kimetsu no Yaiba limited edition A Series (A105) released in Japan in April 2020
- Peanuts limited edition S Series (S310) released in Japan in March 2021.
