= Walkman DD series =

Line of portable audio players by Sony

The Walkman DD was an early series in Sony's Walkman line of portable audio cassette players. The "DD" stood for 'disc drive', with the unit's main motor being directly coupled to the 'disc' of the capstan flywheel assembly while lying perpendicular to it within the unit. This feature was later shared with the Walkman Professional series.

== WM-DD ==
The first model of the series, the WM-DD, was introduced in 1982, and had a solid reputation for performance.

=== Specifications ===
- Body dimensions (WxHxD): 79 × 109.2 x 29 mm
- Weight (with batteries): 290 g
- Power: 3 V DC, from 2 AA batteries, an AC adapter (AC-39), or from an automobile adapter (DCC-127A, PC-200)
- Battery life: 4 hours manganese batteries, alkaline batteries 9 hours (AA batteries)
- Maximum output power: 20 mW +20 mW headphone output
- Wow and flutter: 0.08% WRMS
- Frequency response: 40 ~ 12,000 Hz (normal tape), 40 ~ 15,000 Hz (metal cro2 tape)
- Headphone Accessories: MDR-W5

== WM-DD2 ==
The WM-DD2 was introduced in 1984, and appeared to be a WM-DD that was available in same colors and had the addition of Dolby B noise reduction. In marketing terms this is exactly what it was, though technically the change was far from trivial. The innovation that made this change possible was the introduction of miniature Dolby ICs that could run directly from the 3V battery supply without the need for a DC-DC converter (as had to be employed in the WM-7, for example). Even with these devices the changes made between the WM-DD and the WM-DD2 were far reaching and only possible because the printed circuit board was made with track work on both sides.

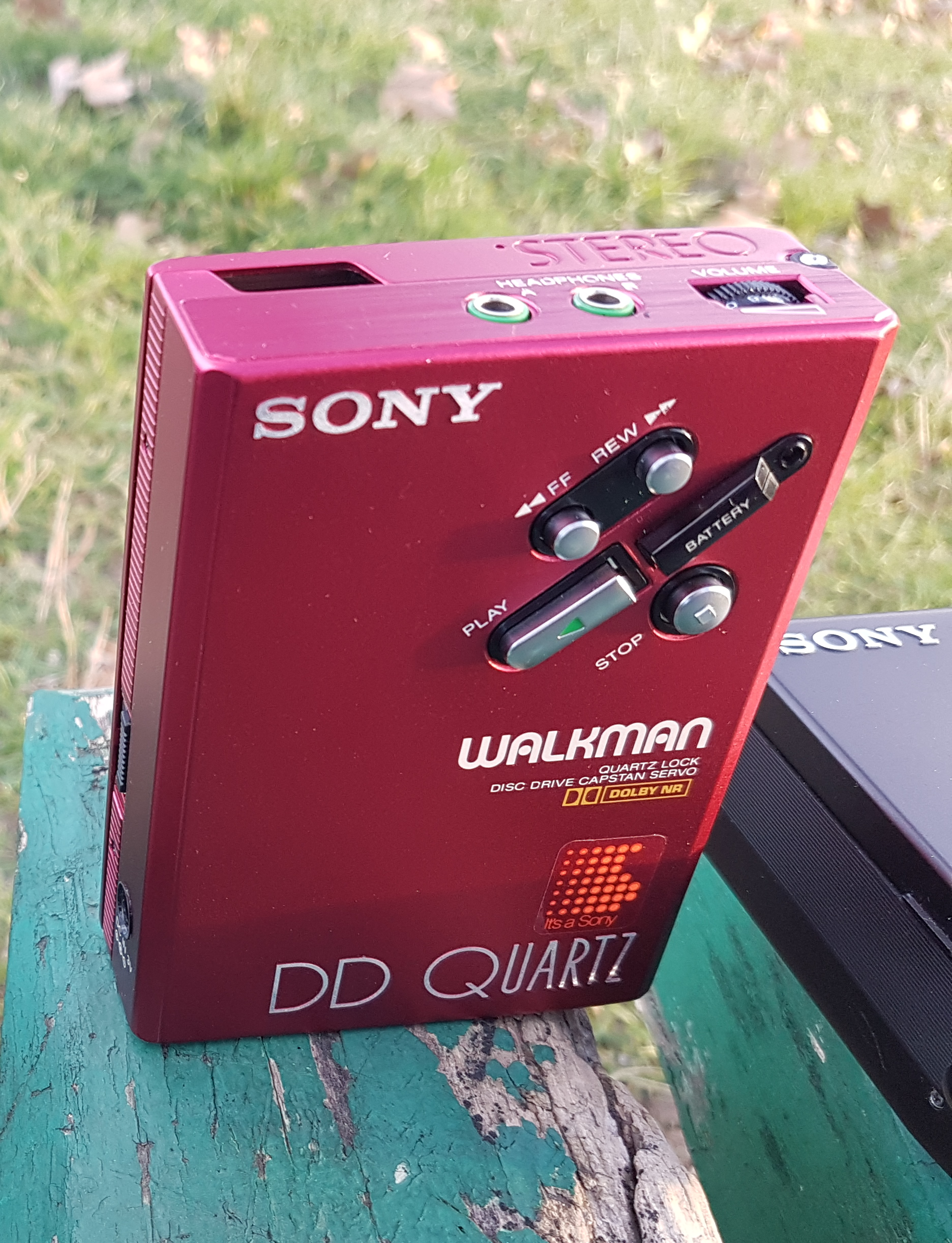

All the user saw, however, was an important extra switch to enable Dolby NR. The next step in the evolution of the Walkman was to add quartz crystal lock to the DD capstan, this appeared in the next model in the series, the WM-DD3.

=== Specifications ===
- Body dimensions (WxHxD): 79 × 109 × 29 mm
- Weight (with batteries): 290 g
- Power: 3 V DC, from 2 AA batteries, an AC adapter (AC-D2), or from an automobile adapter (DCC-70)
- Battery life: 3.5 hours using manganese batteries, 7 hours with alkaline batteries
- Maximum output power: 20 mW +20 mW headphone output
- Noise reduction: Dolby B
- Wow and flutter: 0.13% DIN
- Frequency response: 40 ~ 15,000 Hz (when using a metal cro2 tape)
- Headphone Accessories: Comes with headphones with microphone

== WM-DD3 ==
The WM-DD3 was similar in appearance to the WM-DD2 but the button layout had been changed, launched 1989. It was available in the same three colors as the WM-DD and WM-DD2, but was also available in black. The WM-DD3 was in simple terms a development of the WM-DD2. However, building on the strengths of the previous model, a quartz-locked action was added to the drive motor, providing absolute speed stability under all operating conditions. A similar system had been adopted in the WM-D6 but the WM-DD3 was the first playback-only model to use it.

Unlike the WM-D6, the WM-DD3 did not offer a facility to defeat the quartz lock and trim the playback speed manually. Instead, the circuit was permanently active and fully automatic in action.

Quartz lock aside, the WM-DD3 was nearly identical to the WM-DD2, including the provision of Dolby B NR and switch for normal or metal/chrome tape types.
