= SensMe =

Music mood detection software

SensMe / 12 Tone Analysis
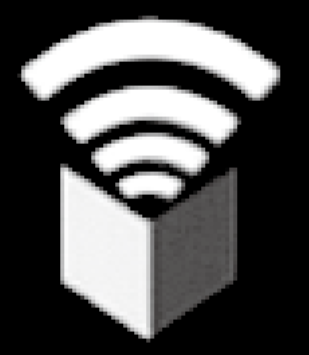
- SensMe Logo

- Screenshot showing SensMe channels on a Walkman player
- Other names: Omakase Channel
- Developer: Sony Corporation
- Release: November 18, 2006
- Platform: Sony Walkman; Sony Ericsson and Sony Xperia; Media Go; PlayStation Portable
- Type: Mood detection software for music data.
- License: Proprietary

SensMe is an automatic playlist generating system for digital music created by Sony Corporation and employed in numerous Sony branded products, including in some Walkman digital music players, the Media Go application, the PlayStation Portable, and some Sony Ericsson and Sony Xperia handsets. It uses a proprietary algorithm technology named 12 Tone Analysis which analyses audio files and then applies them to various SensMe channels based on mood and tempo of the music. SensMe is known as Random Channels (おまかせチャンネル, Omakase Channeru) in Japanese.

== Method ==
SensMe works by using a twelve tone analysis of all the user's music individually, computing track information based on the mood and tempo of the tracks, and then outputting them for the user to play these automatically generated playlists. Initially (on Sony Ericsson devices), the software would use a dual axis map which all the analyzed tracks are plotted into, allowing the user to navigate to an area of the map to play a playlist or an individual track. In later devices, including Walkman DAPs and the PSP, the analyzed tracks are categorised into 12 "channels" that is navigable in a list, with names such as Lounge, Upbeat, Emotional, and others.

== Compatible products ==
SensMe first appeared on the Sony NetJuke NAS-M90HD hard drive based stereo system which was announced in October 2006 and then released in the Japanese market. SensMe's debut on a portable device was on the Sony Ericsson W910i phone released in 2007.

=== PlayStation Portable ===
SensMe channels on a PSP

SensMe was made available on the PlayStation Portable as of system software version 6.10. It can be downloaded via the XMB or by using a computer. The application features twelve channels by which music is categorized. These include Favorites, Newly Added, Dance, Extreme, Lounge, Emotional, Mellow, Upbeat, Relax, Energetic, Morning/Day/Night/Midnight, and Shuffle All.

Version history

Version Release date (UTC)	Description
1.50; March 31, 2010	Music tracks transferred using a PlayStation 3 system or music management application other than Media Go are now also categorized into channels.; Users can now add music tracks to a block list so they do not play.; Users can now activate or deactivate the [Dynamic Normalizer] feature.
1.01; October 22, 2009	Descriptions of some menu items in some languages have been revised.
1.00; October 1, 2009	Initial release.

=== Walkman players ===
The NWZ-S730/S630 was the first Walkman series with SensMe.

- A Series
  - NWZ-A860
  - NWZ-A10
  - NW-A20
  - NW-A30
  - NW-A40
  - NW-A50
- E Series
  - NWZ-E450
  - NWZ-E350
  - NW-E050
  - NWZ-E460
  - NW-E060
  - NWZ-E570/E470
  - NWZ-E580
  - NW-E080
- F Series
  - NWZ-F800
  - NWZ-F880
- S Series
  - NWZ-S730/S630
  - NWZ-S750
  - NWZ-S760
  - NW-S770
  - NW-S780
  - NW-S10
- WM1 Series
  - NW-WM1
- Z Series
  - NWZ-Z1000
- ZX Series
  - NWZ-ZX1
  - NW-ZX2
  - NW-ZX100
  - NW-ZX300

=== Sony Ericsson handsets ===
Screenshot of SensMe on a Sony Ericsson where each analysed song is represented by a dot in a four-grid chart

- Aino
- elm
- W380
- W508
- W518a
- W595
- W705
- W715
- W760
- W890i
- W902
- W910i
- W980
- W995
- Xperia X10
- Xperia Neo
- Xperia Play
- Xperia Ray
- Zylo (W20i) Archived 2011-12-31 at the Wayback Machine

=== Sony Xperia handsets ===
- Xperia E
- Xperia M
- Xperia Sola
- Xperia L
- Xperia S
- Xperia P
- Xperia U
- Xperia T
- Xperia TX
- Xperia TL
- Xperia T2 Ultra
- Xperia tipo
- Xperia Go
- Xperia V
- Xperia Z
- Xperia ZR
- Xperia Z1
- Xperia Z1 Compact
- Xperia Z Ultra
- Xperia Z1f/Z1s
- Xperia ZL
- Xperia SP
- Xperia Z2
- Xperia Z3
- Xperia Z3 Compact

=== Miscellaneous ===
Screenshot of SensMe on Media Go

- Media Go application
- Music Center for PC application (as 12 Tone Analysis)
- Sony HAP-Z1ES Audio HDD player
- Sony Xplod car audio and navigation systems (selected models)
- Sony Tablet
- Sony Xperia Tablet (selected models)
- VAIO Music Box software for compatible Vaio notebooks.
