= Music (Xperia) =

Audio player software by Sony

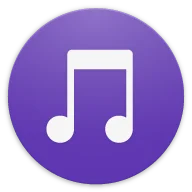

- Developer: Sony Corporation
- Release: 2012
- Stable release: 9.4.12.A.0.6 / June 19, 2023; 3 years ago
- Operating system: Android
- Type: Audio player
- License: Proprietary

Music, formerly known as Walkman, is an audio player software for Android. Developed by Sony Corporation (and previously by Sony Mobile), it is the default music player on Xperia devices and comes preloaded on them.

A similar Walkman app continues to exist on Walkman digital audio players, including those that run on Android.

== History ==
Music was launched as Walkman in 2012, debuting on Sony's first in-house smartphones the Xperia S, Xperia P and Xperia U. It replaced the previous Music Player app on Sony Ericsson devices. Before this, the music player on the Sony Ericsson Zylo and Live with Walkman were also called Walkman.

The Walkman app included all the features that were found on the digital Walkman portable music players of the time. It featured an interface similar to the 'Cover Flow' of the iPod. Features included SensMe channels and Music Unlimited integration.

"Smart Playlists" was introduced in a version 8.0 update along with further TrackID integration. There were some UI tweaks in version 8.4 in 2014. Android Wear support was also soon added.

In 2015 with Android 5.0 Lollipop, the Walkman app was renamed to Music. A 'Quick Play' feature was later added. SensMe was removed in 2016. Some later visual updates made the player styled like Material Design.

Music also featured (on some models) DSEE HX sound processing. DSEE Ultimate is featured starting with Xperia 1 II.

The app became stripped down eventually with the equalizer and headphone settings disappearing.

As of version 9.4.7 (May 2020), the Gracenote metadata feature in the Music app was removed.

== Features ==
- Dark theme
- Playlists in .m3u format
- Sleep timer
- Sound effects

== See also ==
- Comparison of audio player software
- List of music software
