= A1000 =

A1000 may refer to:

- Amiga 1000, a personal computer manufactured by Commodore International
- A1000 road, a main road in the UK
- Sony NW-A1000, a Walkman digital audio player
