= Walkman S Series =

Line of portable media players

The Walkman S Series is a line of portable media players designed and developed by Sony, currently marketed in Japan. The S Series made their debut in the fall of 2006 and later were launched in other regions. Although the first generation of models were small thumb-drive players sitting above the E Series line, next generations of players of the S Series had TFT color displays and supported video playback. They were slightly cheaper than the flagship A Series but had more features than the E Series. As part of a streamlining of the Walkman range, Sony replaced the S Series outside of Japan in 2012 by the E Series, the last model to be marketed globally being the NWZ-S760 series. It continues to be marketed domestically as the entry-level range, the latest model in production as of 2025 being the NW-S310 which was launched in 2017.

== History ==
Two previous models of sports-oriented Network Walkman with the S prefix existed in 2001 and 2003: the NW-S4 and the "S2 Sports" NW-S21/S23.

=== S200 ===
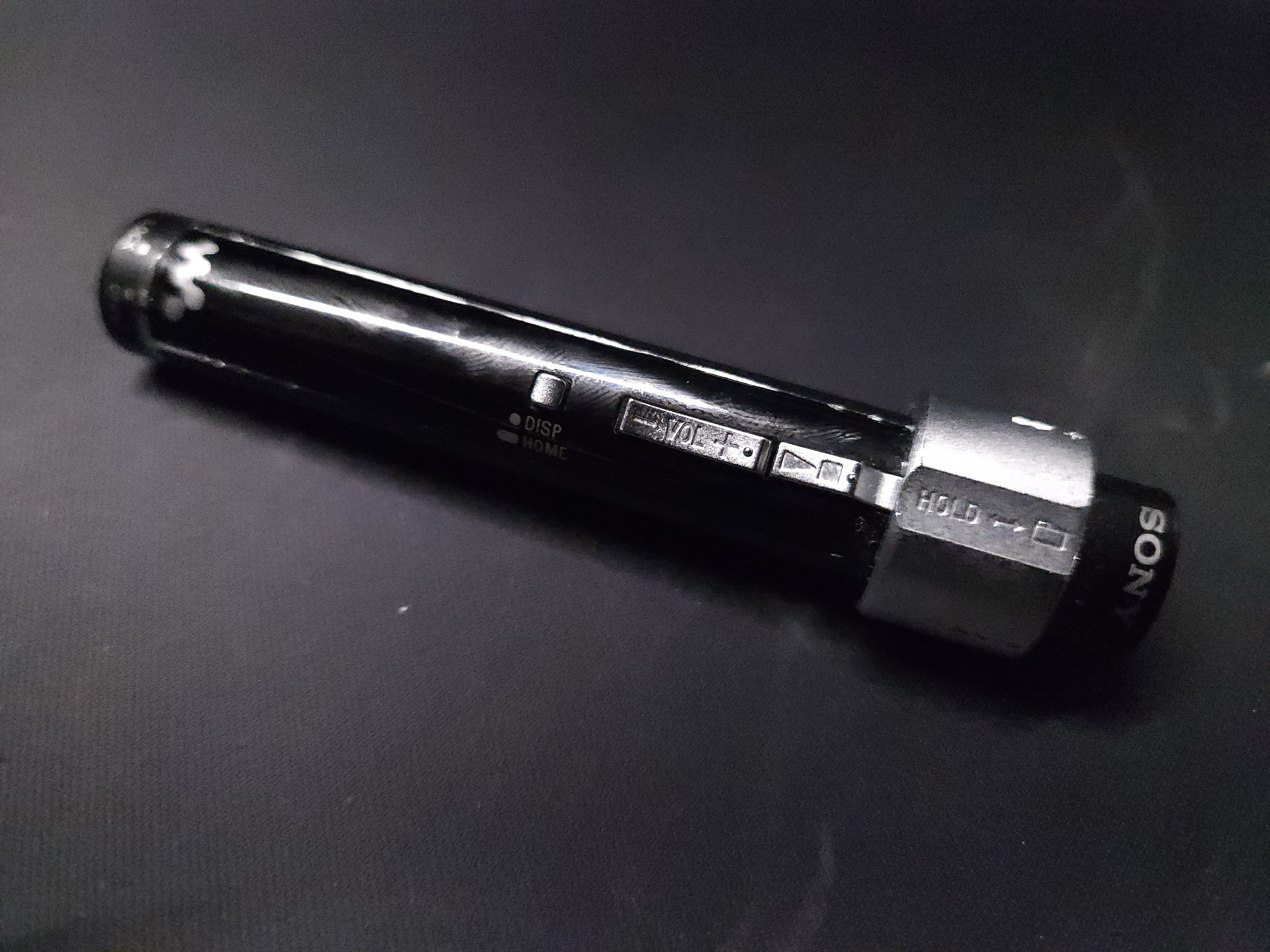
The Sony Walkman NW-S203f, released in 2006

The NW-S200 S2 Sports Walkman released 2006 were cigar shaped and made of aluminum, also featuring a G-Sensor and a pedometer. It is water resistant and came with an armband and sporty headphones. Models were NW-S205 (2 GB), NW-S203 (1 GB), NW-S202 (512 MB).

=== S700/S600 ===
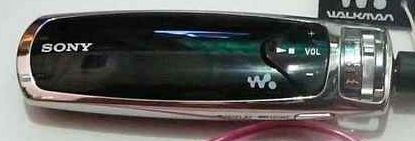
The NW-S700 series was a continuation of the same form factor seen in the NW-A600 and NW-E500.

October 2006 saw the introduction of the NW-S700/600 Series with an "elegant" design, coming in five colors and featuring a 3-line OLED display including album art. It continues the "bottle" style that was previously seen on the A600 and E500/E400 series, but the S700/S600 included numerous proprietary technologies - it was the first with built-in Active noise control technology as well as Clear Audio, Clear Bass, Virtual Phone Technology Acoustic Engine. It blocks surrounding noise with integrating mic in its EX-earphone. This player is one of only a few other DAPs of its time that have a noise cancellation feature at this size. The earphone has a proprietary design specifically made for this player, thus making it impossible to plug into other DAPs, even the ones that come from Sony.

This Walkman has a small OLED screen capable displaying album art and some text information about the song and the player features. Navigation is done with a swiveling switch carried over from some previous small models. The S700 comes in 1 GB (NW-S703), 2 GB (NW-S705), and 4 GB (NW-S706) capacities; some countries sell the 2 GB and 1 GB models only. Selected models with the "F" suffix are also equipped with a Stereo FM Tuner. This was also the first Walkman with the WM-PORT interface connector which would remain a standard for Sony Walkman for years to come.

=== S710/S610/S510 ===
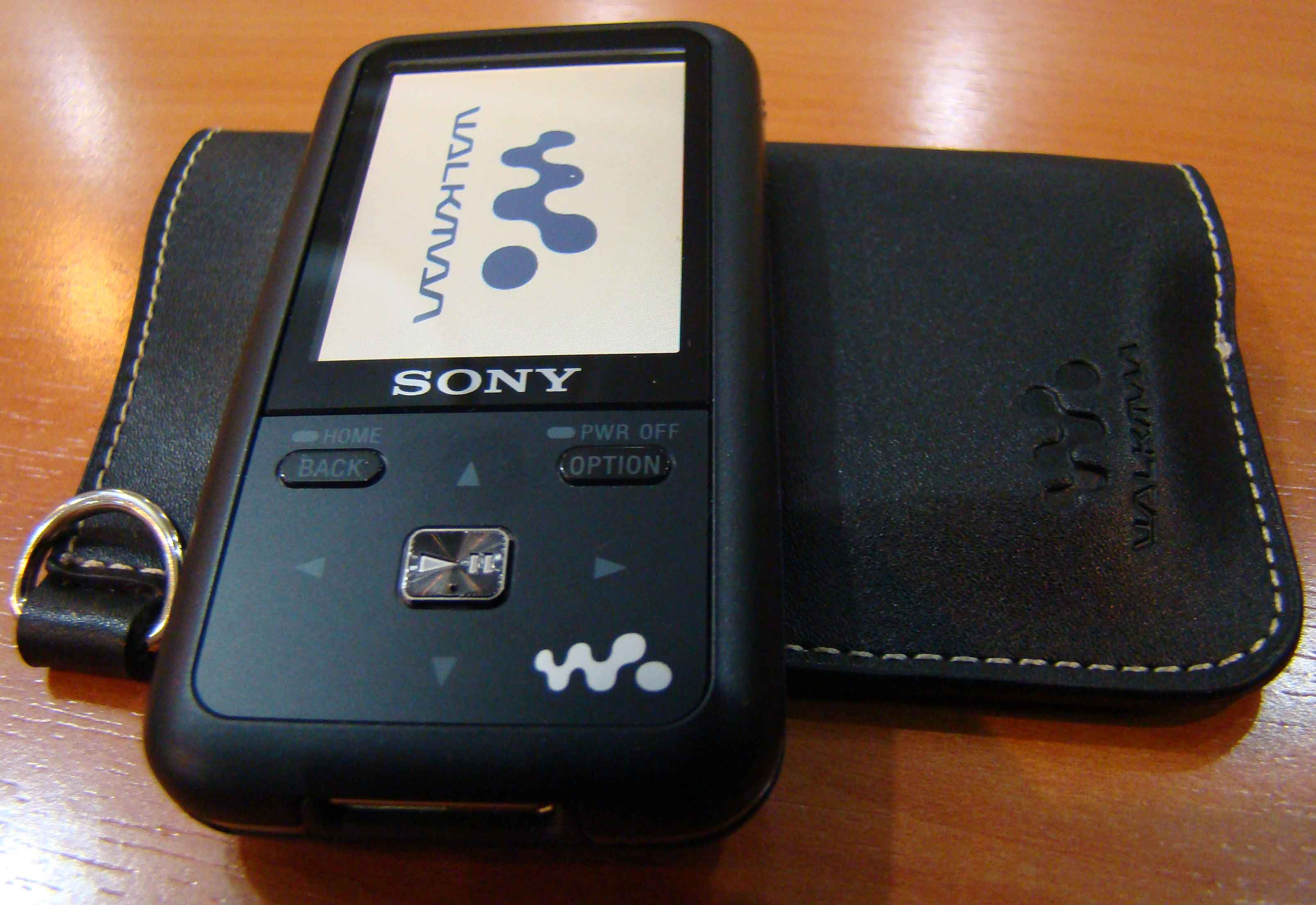
The 2007 S Series launched alongside the NW-A810

Future small sized and/or sporty players would only be released under the B Series or W Series. The S Series was changed into a new mid-level video-enabled range starting with the S710/S610/S510 in August 2007. These were released to complement the new A810 series flagship. The S610 has different styling and was marketed $20 cheaper than the A810 released at the same time. These players had a 320 x 240 pixel QVGA LCD. Just as the A810, the S710/S610 was the joint first to remove ATRAC support and not require SonicStage, apart from domestic Japanese models.

=== S730/S630 ===
The NWZ-S730 and S630 series was introduced in August 2008 focusing on slimline designs, and for the first time introducing Sony's SensMe technology to a Walkman digital audio player, which analyzes and lets the user play music based on moods. They were noted as the thinnest ever Walkmans at the time, 7.5 mm thick. The main difference between the series are that the S730 adds noise canceling which the S630 lacks. Starting with this generation, all S Series players would have the so-called "Mickey Mouse" look, because of the specific positioning of the main buttons.

=== S540 ===
The first and only model with built-in speakers was the S540 series, introduced in August 2009. It had a considerably larger (2.4" LCD) screen with a resolution of 320 X 240 pixels. A slightly bigger chassis allows two endowed speakers to be accommodated at either side of the screen. Below the screen, Sony built its trademark circular control pad which has a standard four-way directional button surrounding a central play/pause key. This is flanked by two additional buttons, back (home) and option (power). The S540 series Walkman is made mostly of plastic but has a shiny metallic topcoat, which gives it a sleek look. The SenseMe and Intelligent Shuffle features were not present in this model. The 8GB S544 went on sale for $110 and the 16GB S545 for $130.

=== S740 and later models ===
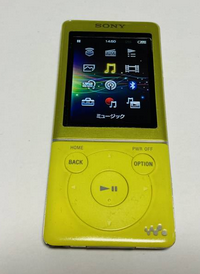
The NW-S770

The NW-S740/S640 series was released in late 2009 in Japan and some other territories. As with the previous generation, the S740 includes noise cancellation compared to S640. The size of the 5 button layout has been increased, while the SensMe function does not appear, although a dedicated Podcast folder has been added. Unlike the preceding S730, the physical noise cancellation switch has been removed in the S740 replaced by a setting in the software.

S750 Series was proclaimed by Sony as "super-slim" when introduced in September 2010. It features Clear Bass, Clear Stereo, SensMe, Lyrics Sync, Karaoke Mode and other features inherited from the E450 series. In 2011 the S760 series introduced Bluetooth connectivity and a greater battery life.

Since the NW-S770 series, the S Series has been only sold and marketed for the domestic market. In 2013 the NW-S780 was launched which is similar to the NWZ-E580 released globally but with added Bluetooth and increased storage. A lower variant of this was marketed in Japan as the NW-E080. The latest model in the S Series is the NW-S310 series which is now positioned as the budget entry-level Walkman offering in the Japanese market.

== Specifications and comparison ==
Series (NW*-)	Image	Model	Capacity	Release date (may differ by region)	Display	Rated battery life (hours)	Data/power connection (input/output)	Physical size	Weight
S200		NW-S202*	512 MB	September 23, 2006	1-line OLED monochrome	Audio: 18	Mini-B USB / USB	96.5 mm 15 mm 15 mm	30 g (1.06 oz)
S200		NW-S203F	1 GB	September 23, 2006	1-line OLED monochrome	Audio: 18	Mini-B USB / USB	96.5 mm 15 mm 15 mm	30 g (1.06 oz)
S200		NW-S205F	2 GB	September 23, 2006	1-line OLED monochrome	Audio: 18	Mini-B USB / USB	96.5 mm 15 mm 15 mm	30 g (1.06 oz)
S200		Includes FM tuner (except non F suffix models) and other sports-targeted features.							
S700 / S600		NW-S603	1 GB	November 18, 2006	3-line OLED colour	Audio: 45–50	WM-PORT / USB	88.1 mm 27.4 mm 17 mm	47 g (1.66 oz)
S700 / S600		NW-S605	2 GB	November 18, 2006	3-line OLED colour	Audio: 45–50	WM-PORT / USB	88.1 mm 27.4 mm 17 mm	47 g (1.66 oz)
S700 / S600		NW-S703F	1 GB	October 21, 2006	3-line OLED colour	Audio: 45–50	WM-PORT / USB	88.1 mm 27.4 mm 17 mm	47 g (1.66 oz)
S700 / S600		NW-S705F	2 GB	October 21, 2006	3-line OLED colour	Audio: 45–50	WM-PORT / USB	88.1 mm 27.4 mm 17 mm	47 g (1.66 oz)
S700 / S600		NW-S706F	4 GB	October 21, 2006	3-line OLED colour	Audio: 45–50	WM-PORT / USB	88.1 mm 27.4 mm 17 mm	47 g (1.66 oz)
S700 / S600		Virtual successor of the A600 series. ATRAC Advanced Lossless support added. Clear Audio technology. S700 features noise cancelling and FM radio which are not present in S600.							
S710 / S610 / S510		NWZ-S515	2 GB	October 20, 2007	1.8" TFT LCD; 240 x 320 (QVGA)	Audio: 33; Video: 8	WM-PORT / USB	79.5 mm 42 mm 11.5 mm	50 g (1.76 oz)
S710 / S610 / S510		NWZ-S516	4 GB	October 20, 2007	1.8" TFT LCD; 240 x 320 (QVGA)	Audio: 33; Video: 8	WM-PORT / USB	79.5 mm 42 mm 11.5 mm	50 g (1.76 oz)
S710 / S610 / S510		NWZ-S615F	2 GB	October 20, 2007	1.8" TFT LCD; 240 x 320 (QVGA)	Audio: 33; Video: 8	WM-PORT / USB	79.5 mm 42 mm 11.5 mm	50 g (1.76 oz)
S710 / S610 / S510		NWZ-S616F	4 GB	October 20, 2007	1.8" TFT LCD; 240 x 320 (QVGA)	Audio: 33; Video: 8	WM-PORT / USB	79.5 mm 42 mm 11.5 mm	50 g (1.76 oz)
S710 / S610 / S510		NWZ-S618F	8 GB	October 20, 2007	1.8" TFT LCD; 240 x 320 (QVGA)	Audio: 33; Video: 8	WM-PORT / USB	79.5 mm 42 mm 11.5 mm	50 g (1.76 oz)
S710 / S610 / S510		NWZ-S715F	2 GB	October 20, 2007	1.8" TFT LCD; 240 x 320 (QVGA)	Audio: 33; Video: 8	WM-PORT / USB	79.5 mm 42 mm 11.5 mm	50 g (1.76 oz)
S710 / S610 / S510		NWZ-S716F	4 GB	October 20, 2007	1.8" TFT LCD; 240 x 320 (QVGA)	Audio: 33; Video: 8	WM-PORT / USB	79.5 mm 42 mm 11.5 mm	50 g (1.76 oz)
S710 / S610 / S510		NWZ-S718F	8 GB	October 20, 2007	1.8" TFT LCD; 240 x 320 (QVGA)	Audio: 33; Video: 8	WM-PORT / USB	79.5 mm 42 mm 11.5 mm	50 g (1.76 oz)
S710 / S610 / S510		First model in refreshed S Series. ATRAC support dropped outside Japan. S610 lacks noice cancelling. S510 lacks noise cancelling, video-playing capability and FM radio.							
S730 / S630		NWZ-S636F	4 GB	October 11, 2008	2" TFT LCD; 240 x 320 (QVGA)	Audio: 40; Video: 10	WM-PORT / USB	89.5 mm 42.9 mm 7.5 mm	46 g (1.62 oz)
S730 / S630		NWZ-S638F	8 GB	October 11, 2008	2" TFT LCD; 240 x 320 (QVGA)	Audio: 40; Video: 10	WM-PORT / USB	89.5 mm 42.9 mm 7.5 mm	46 g (1.62 oz)
S730 / S630		NWZ-S639F	16 GB	October 11, 2008	2" TFT LCD; 240 x 320 (QVGA)	Audio: 40; Video: 10	WM-PORT / USB	89.5 mm 42.9 mm 7.5 mm	46 g (1.62 oz)
S730 / S630		NWZ-S736F	4 GB	October 11, 2008	2" TFT LCD; 240 x 320 (QVGA)	Audio: 40; Video: 10	WM-PORT / USB	89.5 mm 42.9 mm 7.5 mm	46 g (1.62 oz)
S730 / S630		NWZ-S738F	8 GB	October 11, 2008	2" TFT LCD; 240 x 320 (QVGA)	Audio: 40; Video: 10	WM-PORT / USB	89.5 mm 42.9 mm 7.5 mm	46 g (1.62 oz)
S730 / S630		NWZ-S739F	16 GB	October 11, 2008	2" TFT LCD; 240 x 320 (QVGA)	Audio: 40; Video: 10	WM-PORT / USB	89.5 mm 42.9 mm 7.5 mm	46 g (1.62 oz)
S730 / S630		SensMe Channels added. S630 lacks noise cancelling capability.							
S740 / S640		NW-S644	8 GB	October 10, 2009	2" TFT LCD; 240 x 320 (QVGA)	Audio: 42; Video: 10	WM-PORT / USB	92 mm 41 mm 7.9 mm	53 g (1.87 oz)
S740 / S640		NW-S645	16 GB	October 10, 2009	2" TFT LCD; 240 x 320 (QVGA)	Audio: 42; Video: 10	WM-PORT / USB	92 mm 41 mm 7.9 mm	53 g (1.87 oz)
S740 / S640		NWZ-S744	8 GB	October 10, 2009	2" TFT LCD; 240 x 320 (QVGA)	Audio: 42; Video: 10	WM-PORT / USB	92 mm 41 mm 7.9 mm	53 g (1.87 oz)
S740 / S640		NWZ-S745	16 GB	October 10, 2009	2" TFT LCD; 240 x 320 (QVGA)	Audio: 42; Video: 10	WM-PORT / USB	92 mm 41 mm 7.9 mm	53 g (1.87 oz)
S740 / S640		S640 lacks noise cancellation.							
S540		NWZ-S543	4 GB	October 2009	2.4" TFT LCD; 240 x 320 (QVGA)	Audio: 42 (via headphones) / 17 (via built-in speakers); Video:	WM-PORT / USB	99.3 mm 49.3 mm 10.2 mm	68 g (2.4 oz)
S540		NWZ-S544	8 GB	October 2009	2.4" TFT LCD; 240 x 320 (QVGA)	Audio: 42 (via headphones) / 17 (via built-in speakers); Video:	WM-PORT / USB	99.3 mm 49.3 mm 10.2 mm	68 g (2.4 oz)
S540		NWZ-S545	16 GB	October 2009	2.4" TFT LCD; 240 x 320 (QVGA)	Audio: 42 (via headphones) / 17 (via built-in speakers); Video:	WM-PORT / USB	99.3 mm 49.3 mm 10.2 mm	68 g (2.4 oz)
S540		Built-in stereo speakers. Does not include SensMe Channels or Intelligent Shuffle. Not released in Japan.							
S750		NWZ-S754	8 GB	October 9, 2010	2" TFT LCD; 240 x 320 (QVGA)	Audio: 40–50; Video: 9–10	WM-PORT / USB	94 mm 42.5 mm 7.2 mm	55 g (1.94 oz)
S750		NWZ-S755	16 GB	October 9, 2010	2" TFT LCD; 240 x 320 (QVGA)	Audio: 40–50; Video: 9–10	WM-PORT / USB	94 mm 42.5 mm 7.2 mm	55 g (1.94 oz)
S760		NWZ-S763	4 GB	October 8, 2011	2" TFT LCD; 240 x 320 (QVGA)	Audio: 50 / 12 (with Bluetooth) Video: 10 / 6 (with Bluetooth)	WM-PORT / USB	97.5 mm 43.6 mm 7.9 mm	57 g (2.01 oz)
S760		NWZ-S764	8 GB	October 8, 2011	2" TFT LCD; 240 x 320 (QVGA)	Audio: 50 / 12 (with Bluetooth) Video: 10 / 6 (with Bluetooth)	WM-PORT / USB	97.5 mm 43.6 mm 7.9 mm	57 g (2.01 oz)
S760		NWZ-S765	16 GB	October 8, 2011	2" TFT LCD; 240 x 320 (QVGA)	Audio: 50 / 12 (with Bluetooth) Video: 10 / 6 (with Bluetooth)	WM-PORT / USB	97.5 mm 43.6 mm 7.9 mm	57 g (2.01 oz)
S760		NW-S766	32 GB	October 8, 2011	2" TFT LCD; 240 x 320 (QVGA)	Audio: 50 / 12 (with Bluetooth) Video: 10 / 6 (with Bluetooth)	WM-PORT / USB	97.5 mm 43.6 mm 7.9 mm	57 g (2.01 oz)
S760		Bluetooth functionality added (models with -BT suffix).							
S770 (Japan)		NW-S774	8 GB	October 20, 2012	2" TFT LCD; 240 x 320 (QVGA)	Audio: 36 / 8 (with Bluetooth) Video: 5-6 / 4 (with Bluetooth)	WM-PORT / USB	97.2 mm 42.7 mm 7 mm	51 g (1.8 oz)
S770 (Japan)		NW-S775	16 GB	October 20, 2012	2" TFT LCD; 240 x 320 (QVGA)	Audio: 36 / 8 (with Bluetooth) Video: 5-6 / 4 (with Bluetooth)	WM-PORT / USB	97.2 mm 42.7 mm 7 mm	51 g (1.8 oz)
S780 (Japan)		NW-S784	8 GB	October 19, 2013	2" TFT LCD; 240 x 320 (QVGA)	Audio: 62-77 / 21 (with Bluetooth) Video: 13-14 / 10 (with Bluetooth)	WM-PORT / USB	92.0 mm 41.7 mm 7.5 mm	50 g (1.76 oz)
S780 (Japan)		NW-S785	16 GB	October 19, 2013	2" TFT LCD; 240 x 320 (QVGA)	Audio: 62-77 / 21 (with Bluetooth) Video: 13-14 / 10 (with Bluetooth)	WM-PORT / USB	92.0 mm 41.7 mm 7.5 mm	50 g (1.76 oz)
S780 (Japan)		NW-S786	32 GB	October 19, 2013	2" TFT LCD; 240 x 320 (QVGA)	Audio: 62-77 / 21 (with Bluetooth) Video: 13-14 / 10 (with Bluetooth)	WM-PORT / USB	92.0 mm 41.7 mm 7.5 mm	50 g (1.76 oz)
S780 (Japan)		FLAC support added.							
S10 (Japan)		NW-S13	4 GB	November 2014	2" TFT LCD; 240 x 320 (QVGA)	Audio: 62-77 / 21 (with Bluetooth) Video: 13-14 / 10 (with Bluetooth)	WM-PORT / USB	92.0 mm 41.7 mm 7.5 mm	50 g (1.76 oz)
S10 (Japan)		NW-S14	8 GB	November 2014	2" TFT LCD; 240 x 320 (QVGA)	Audio: 62-77 / 21 (with Bluetooth) Video: 13-14 / 10 (with Bluetooth)	WM-PORT / USB	92.0 mm 41.7 mm 7.5 mm	50 g (1.76 oz)
S10 (Japan)		NW-S15	16 GB	November 2014	2" TFT LCD; 240 x 320 (QVGA)	Audio: 62-77 / 21 (with Bluetooth) Video: 13-14 / 10 (with Bluetooth)	WM-PORT / USB	92.0 mm 41.7 mm 7.5 mm	50 g (1.76 oz)
S310 (Japan)		NW-S313	4 GB	September 2017	1.77" TFT LCD; 128 x 160 (QQVGA)	Audio: 40-52 / 23 (with Bluetooth)	WM-PORT / USB	94.5 mm 43.5 mm 9.1 mm	53 g (1.87 oz)
S310 (Japan)		NW-S315	16 GB	September 2017	1.77" TFT LCD; 128 x 160 (QQVGA)	Audio: 40-52 / 23 (with Bluetooth)	WM-PORT / USB	94.5 mm 43.5 mm 9.1 mm	53 g (1.87 oz)
S310 (Japan)		New interface. Video and image playback removed. ATRAC, HE-AAC and ALAC support removed. LRC lyrics reader, Karaoke Mode, SensMe, VPT surround sound and ClearAudio+ features omitted.							

== See also ==
- Walkman
- Walkman A Series
- Walkman E Series
- Walkman X Series
