= DSEE =

Sound quality improvement technology by Sony

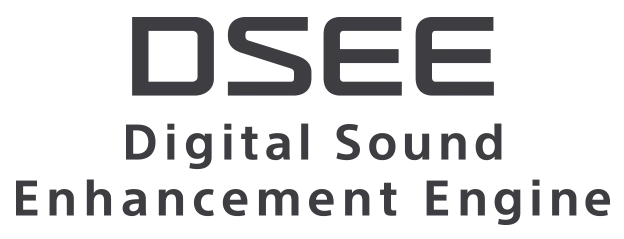

Digital sound enhancement engine (DSEE) is a sound quality improvement technology, developed by Sony for playing lossy compressed music files.

== Variants ==
=== DSEE ===
Introduced in 2006, DSEE is included in Sony's digital Walkman products and freeware SonicStage CP (version 4.2 or higher), x-app, and Music Center for PC. In operation, it analyzes irreversibly compressed music files such as MP3, ATRAC3, AAC, and WMA, and performs predictive calculations to compensate for high-frequency sounds lost due to compression, thereby improving sound quality.

If the playing music on a Walkman has a high sound quality (bit rate), or if the sound quality is too low, the system determines that it cannot be enhanced and DSEE is temporarily disabled to save battery.

=== DSEE HX ===
DSEE HX appears on high-resolution audio compatible devices, such as the F880 and ZX1 series Walkman players, Xperia smartphones, and version 2.x of Music Center for PC. However some products like the HAP-Z1ES hard disk player come with normal DSEE.

The Walkman A30 and WM1 series that appeared in 2016 have been expanded to a maximum of 192kHz/32bit, and higher-end models such as the WM1 series and ZX series can now select from 5 modes for each song. The Walkman A50 series is equipped with artificial intelligence technology that automatically determines the type of music being processed and improves high-frequency correction performance.

=== DSEE Extreme ===
DSEE Extreme is installed in the WH-1000XM5 to 1000X series of wireless headphones with noise canceling function announced on August 7, 2020, the WF-1000XM5 and WF-1000XM4 series of wireless earbuds, the HT-A9 home theater system, and the HT-A7000, HT-A5000, and HT-A3000 sound bars. It is an improved version of the aforementioned DSEE HX equipped with AI technology. It also now supports transmission using the LDAC codec.

=== DSEE Ultimate ===
Sony 1, 5 and 10 series Xperia smartphones feature DSEE Ultimate since the 1 II in 2020. It uses AI from the DSEE HX and DSEE Extreme to process frequency bands up to 192 kHz. In addition, it also applies the same 24-bit depth expansion as Extreme, making it compatible with streaming services, videos, and games.

The DSEE Ultimate technology has also been installed into the A100 and ZX500 series Walkman as an update in October 2020. However it only applies when using the W. (Walkman) music playing software and a wired connection. The frequency band processing is 192 kHz, the same as Xperia, but it can also extend the depth to 32 bits. For apps other than W. music, DSEE HX equipped with AI technology operates as before. Walkman WM1ZM2 and WM1AM2 released in March 2022 and A300 and ZX700 series released in January 2023 are equipped with DSEE Ultimate and it now applies to all apps and both wired and Bluetooth connections.
