= Sony Ericsson W995 =

Cell phone model

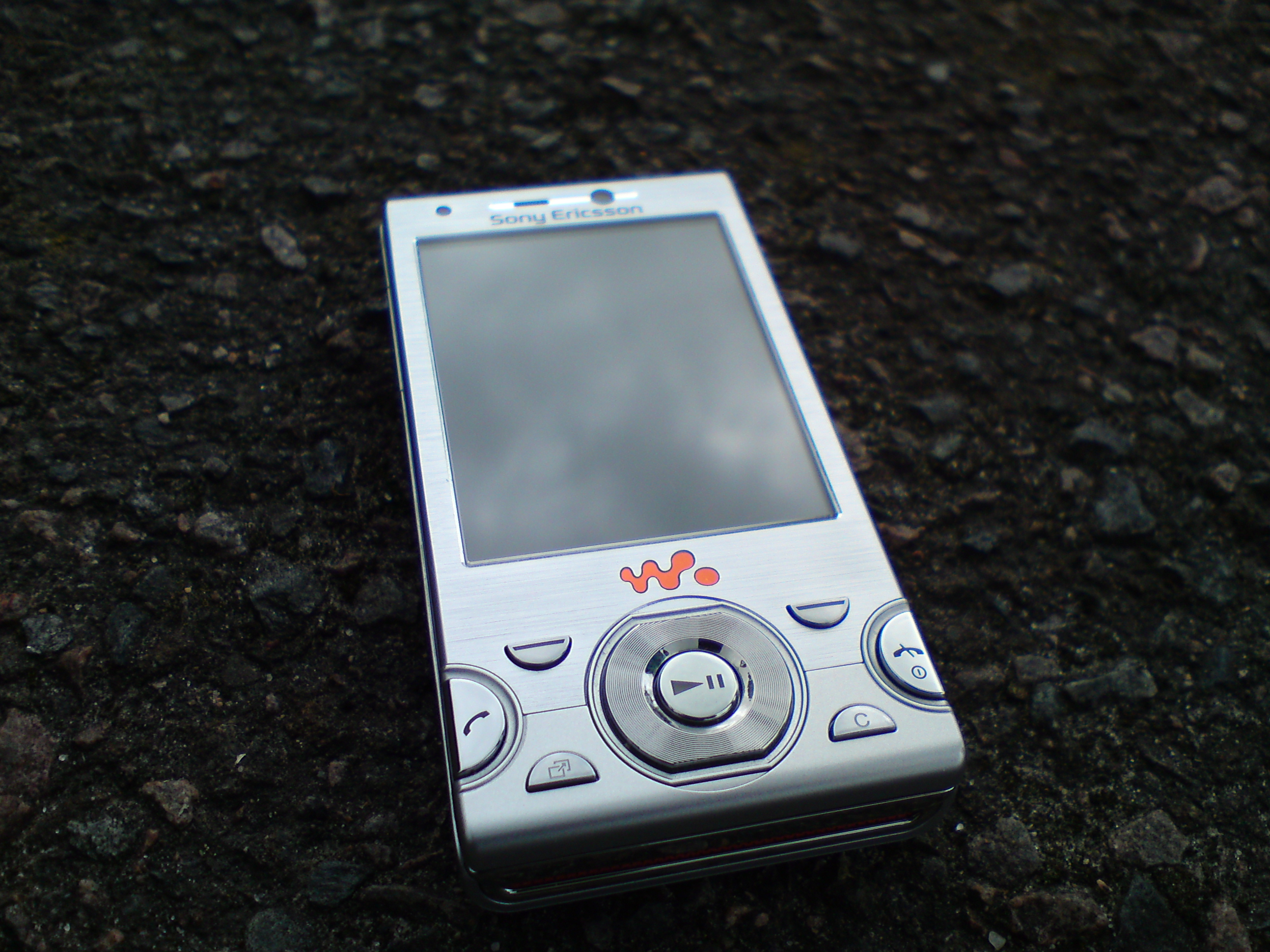
- Manufacturer: Sony Ericsson
- Predecessor: Sony Ericsson W980
- Related: Sony Ericsson C905, Sony Ericsson F905
- Compatible networks: GSM/GPRS/EDGE 850/900/1800/1900, UMTS/HSPA 900/2100
- Form factor: Candybar Slide
- Dimensions: 97.0×49.0×15.0 mm (3.82×1.93×0.59 in)
- Weight: 113.0 g
- CPU: ARM 11 369 MHz
- Memory: 118 MB internal, Memory Stick Micro (M2) support (up to 16 GB)
- Rear camera: 8.1 MP
- Display: 2.6 inch, 240×320 px display
- Connectivity: WiFi, Bluetooth, USB 2.0, GPS/A-GPS

The Sony Ericsson W995 is a slider-style mobile phone designed by Sony Ericsson as their flagship Walkman phone, previously known as codename "Hikaru". The W995 was introduced February 2009 and released on 4 June 2009 and uses the 4th version of the 'Walkman Player'. It is also the first Walkman phone to feature a standard 3.5 mm headset jack rather than requiring a FastPort connection.

On August 21, 2009, it won the EISA Best Music Phone Award.

== Features ==
It features an 8.1-megapixel camera, similar to that of the C905 model. While its still-image quality was comparable to other camera phones of the period, its video recording capability was limited to QVGA (320 × 240) resolution, which was lower than the VGA and HD formats available on many competing devices.

The W995 is available in three different colors which have been advertised as Progressive Black, Cosmic Silver and Energetic Red. It comes with an 8 GB memory card in its package.

In addition below are specifications:

- Battery life: Talking - 9 hours; Music - 20 hours; Video - 5 hours
- Camera: 8.1 Megapixel with Autofocus, LED flash, x16 digital zoom, Geotagging, Face detection, Smile Shutter, Shake Control (Image Stabiliser), Best Picture Feature, and QVGA@30FPS video recording
- Audio: Clear Stereo and Clear Bass
- Walkman services: TrackID, SensMe, Walkman Player 4.0
- Connectivity: Internet Browser (BBC iPlayer and YouTube-compatible), SMS, MMS, Email, IM (Instant messaging), WAP, 3G/HSPA (quad-band), GPS with a-GPS function, Wi-Fi (although the phone is not VoIP enabled), SIP (Restricted to Specific Mobile Networks), Bluetooth 2.0 with A2DP, DLNA Certified
- Display: 2.6 inches, 240 × 320 pixels
- Storage: 118 MB internal, supports up to 16 GB Memory Stick Micro (M2)
- Other features: FM Radio, Photo/Video Editing, Kickstand, Accelerometer, 3.5mm audio jack

== See also ==
- Sony Ericsson Satio
- Samsung i900 Omnia
- Nokia N86 8MP
