= Sony Ericsson W760 =

Mobile phone model

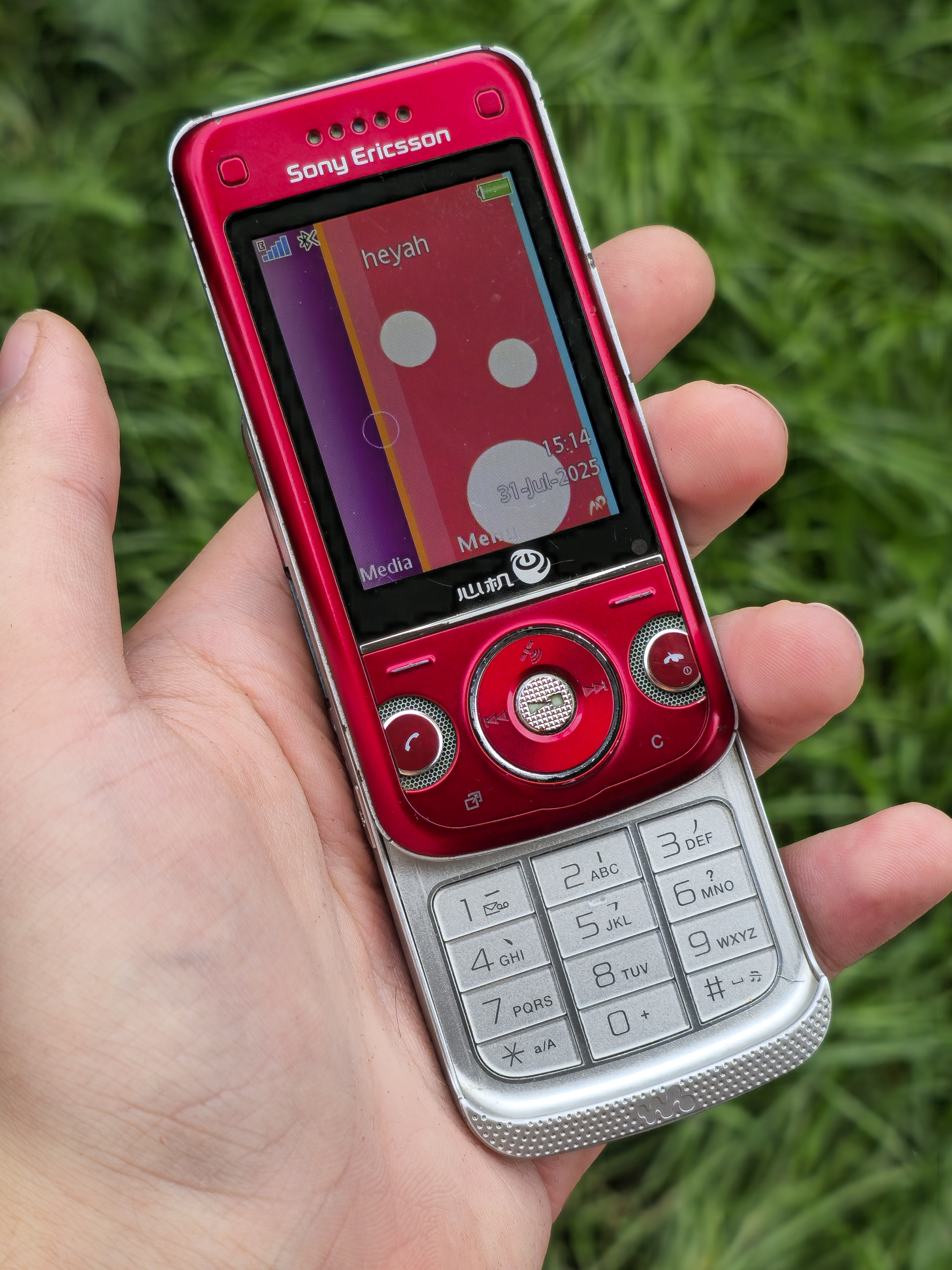
- Manufacturer: Sony Ericsson
- Availability by region: June 2008
- Compatible networks: -GSM (850/900/1800/1900) -Quad band EDGE -UMTS 850/1900/2100 with HSDPA
- Form factor: Slider
- Dimensions: 103.0×48.0×15.0 mm (4.06×1.89×0.59 in)
- Weight: 103 g (4 oz)
- Operating system: Sony Ericsson Java-based proprietary OS
- Memory: 40 MB internal
- Removable storage: Memory Stick Micro (M2) (up to 8 GB)
- Rear camera: 3.2 megapixel and QVGA Video Recording
- Display: 240x320 pixel 262K TFT LCD
- Connectivity: -Bluetooth 2.0 -USB 2.0 (proprietary)
- Data inputs: -Keypad -Accelerometer -Motion sensor

The Sony Ericsson W760 is a slider model music phone. It includes many of the same features found in Sony Ericsson's line of Walkman branded music phones, although also includes GPS navigation, shake/tilt sensors, and Sony's 'SensMe' music feature built in.

The W760 is available in three different colours marketed as "Fancy Red", "Intense Black" and "Rocky Silver". Included in certain retail configurations are a 1 GB or 2 GB capacity memory card. As well as the Walkman digital music player, the W760 can also play FM radio with features using RDS and GraceNote TrackID service.

The W760a model is for the United States, being offered by AT&T Wireless with the carrier's services.
