= Walkman F Series =

Portable media player

Walkman F series

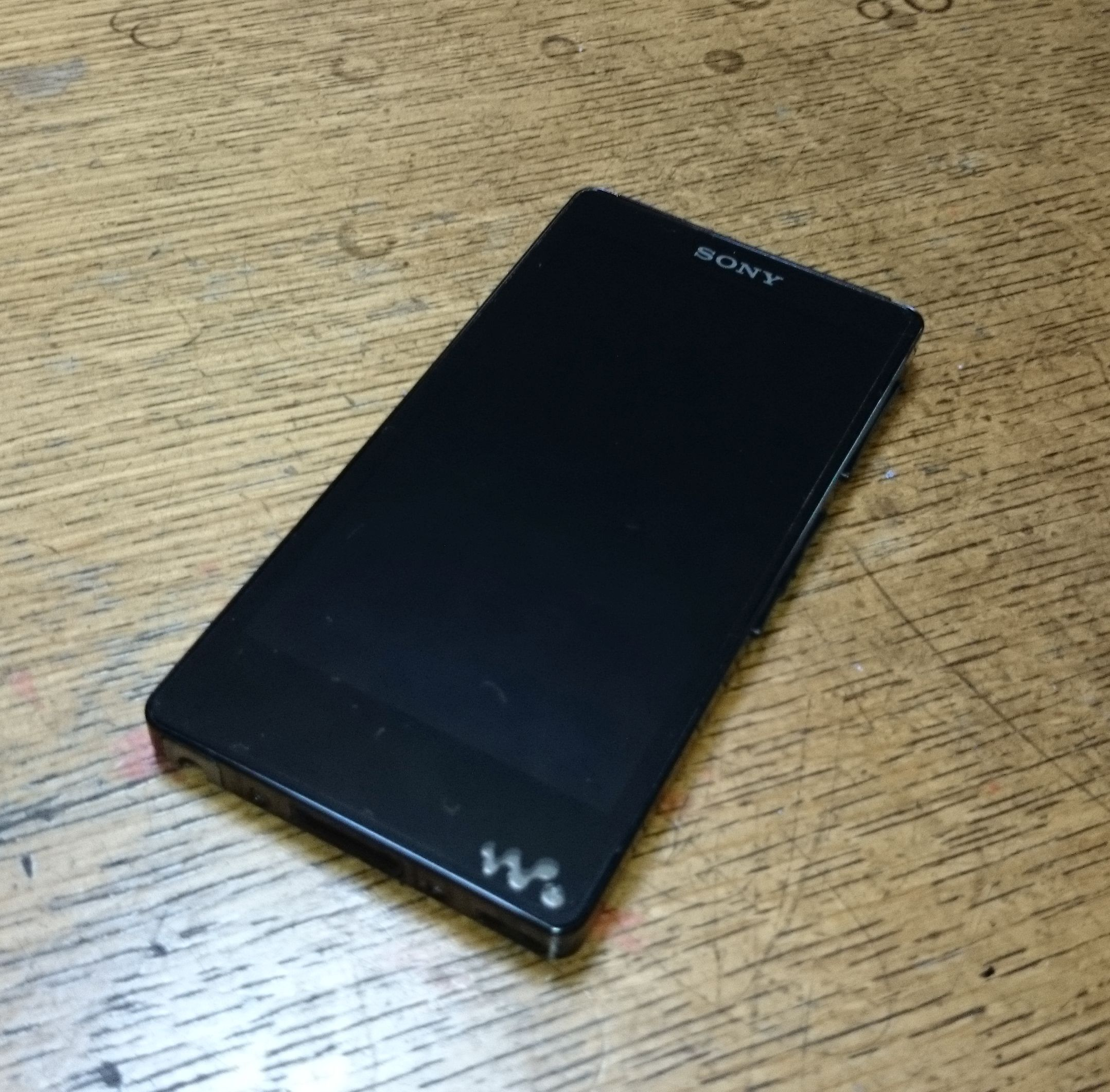
- A Sony NWZ-F887
- Manufacturer: Sony Corporation
- Type: Portable media player
- Lifespan: 2012 – 2014
- Operating system: Android Jelly Bean
- Storage: 8–64 gigabyte flash memory
- Display: 3.5 inches (8.9 cm) (NW-F800); 4.0 inches (10 cm) (NW-F880)
- Connectivity: WM-PORT; USB 2.0 compliant Wi-Fi (IEEE 802.11 b/g/n); Bluetooth
- Predecessor: Walkman Z series
- Successor: Walkman A series
- Related: Walkman

The Walkman F series is a discontinued portable media player manufactured as a part of Sony's Walkman line of music players, through two generations. They are high-res compatible players and run the Android operating system.

== History and features ==
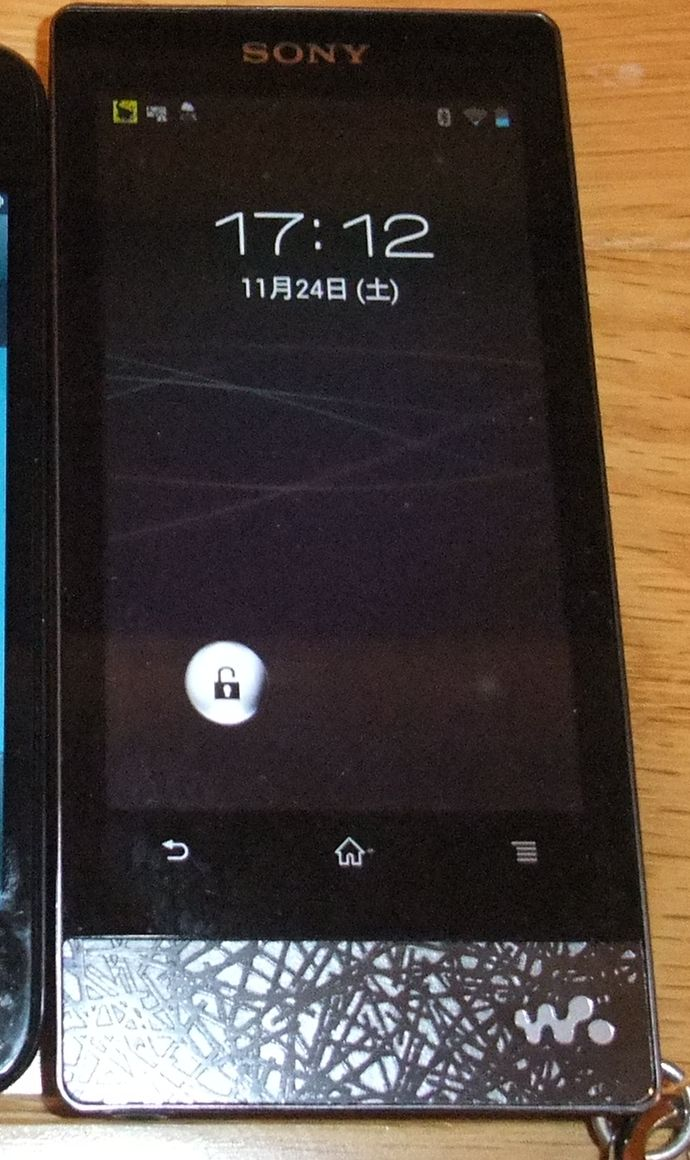
The F800

The first generation, series NW-F800, was introduced in July 2012 as the replacement of the similar looking Walkman Z series and by extension effectively of the A series. The F800 was the first ever Walkman to support the playback of FLAC audio files. It runs version 4.0 of Android (ICS). The F800 is both smaller and lighter than its preceding Walkman Z1000.

The second generation, the NW-F880, was released in October 2013. It was the first Walkman player to support high-resolution audio sources (192 kHz/24-bit). The F880 adds NFC support allowing for easy pairing with NFC compatible devices like speakers. It also adds a built-in FM transmitter in some regions. It ran version 4.1 of Android (Jelly Bean).

Through a software update, the F880 players also gain support for DSD format playback, and the DSEE technology is upscaled to DSEE HX.

The F series was eventually discontinued as its place in the market was taken over by the A series's NW-A10.

== Reception ==
In its review for the NWZ-F886, Trusted Reviews gave praise for "superb" hi-res audio quality, display and battery life, but criticised the provided headphones and that its 32 GB storage could be quickly filled with hi-res files.

== Specifications and comparison ==
| Series | Model | Capacity | Release date | Display | Rated battery life | Audio formats | Wireless connectivity | CPU | Physical size | Weight |
|---|---|---|---|---|---|---|---|---|---|---|
| F800 | NWZ-F804 | 8 GB | October 2012 | 3.5" LCD 800x480 (WVGA) | 20 hours | MP3, WMA, ATRAC (Japanese market), ATRAC Advanced Lossless (Japanese market), WAV, AAC, HE-AAC, FLAC | IEEE 802.11 a/b/g, Bluetooth 3.0 | NVIDIA Tegra 2 1 GHz | 114.5 mm 57 mm 8.9 mm | 100 g (3.53 oz) |
| F800 | NWZ-F805 | 16 GB | October 2012 | 3.5" LCD 800x480 (WVGA) | 20 hours | MP3, WMA, ATRAC (Japanese market), ATRAC Advanced Lossless (Japanese market), WAV, AAC, HE-AAC, FLAC | IEEE 802.11 a/b/g, Bluetooth 3.0 | NVIDIA Tegra 2 1 GHz | 114.5 mm 57 mm 8.9 mm | 100 g (3.53 oz) |
| F800 | NWZ-F806 | 32 GB | October 2012 | 3.5" LCD 800x480 (WVGA) | 20 hours | MP3, WMA, ATRAC (Japanese market), ATRAC Advanced Lossless (Japanese market), WAV, AAC, HE-AAC, FLAC | IEEE 802.11 a/b/g, Bluetooth 3.0 | NVIDIA Tegra 2 1 GHz | 114.5 mm 57 mm 8.9 mm | 100 g (3.53 oz) |
| F800 | NWZ-F807 | 64 GB | October 2012 | 3.5" LCD 800x480 (WVGA) | 20 hours | MP3, WMA, ATRAC (Japanese market), ATRAC Advanced Lossless (Japanese market), WAV, AAC, HE-AAC, FLAC | IEEE 802.11 a/b/g, Bluetooth 3.0 | NVIDIA Tegra 2 1 GHz | 114.5 mm 57 mm 8.9 mm | 100 g (3.53 oz) |
| F880 | NW-F885 | 16 GB | October 2013 | 4" LCD 854x480 (WQVGA) | 17–35 hours | MP3, WMA, ATRAC (Japanese market), ATRAC Advanced Lossless (Japanese market), WAV, AAC, HE-AAC, FLAC, Apple Lossless, AIFF, DSD (through update) | IEEE 802.11 a/b/g/n, Bluetooth 3.0, FM transmitter (some regions) | Texas Instruments OMAP4430 1 GHz | 116 mm 58 mm 8 mm | 103 g (3.63 oz) |
| F880 | NW-F886 | 32 GB | October 2013 | 4" LCD 854x480 (WQVGA) | 17–35 hours | MP3, WMA, ATRAC (Japanese market), ATRAC Advanced Lossless (Japanese market), WAV, AAC, HE-AAC, FLAC, Apple Lossless, AIFF, DSD (through update) | IEEE 802.11 a/b/g/n, Bluetooth 3.0, FM transmitter (some regions) | Texas Instruments OMAP4430 1 GHz | 116 mm 58 mm 8 mm | 103 g (3.63 oz) |
| F880 | NW-F887 | 64 GB | October 2013 | 4" LCD 854x480 (WQVGA) | 17–35 hours | MP3, WMA, ATRAC (Japanese market), ATRAC Advanced Lossless (Japanese market), WAV, AAC, HE-AAC, FLAC, Apple Lossless, AIFF, DSD (through update) | IEEE 802.11 a/b/g/n, Bluetooth 3.0, FM transmitter (some regions) | Texas Instruments OMAP4430 1 GHz | 116 mm 58 mm 8 mm | 103 g (3.63 oz) |

== See also ==
- Walkman A Series
- Walkman Z Series
- Walkman ZX Series
- List of Sony Walkman products
