= Sony Ericsson W518a =

Clamshell-style mobile phone released in 2009

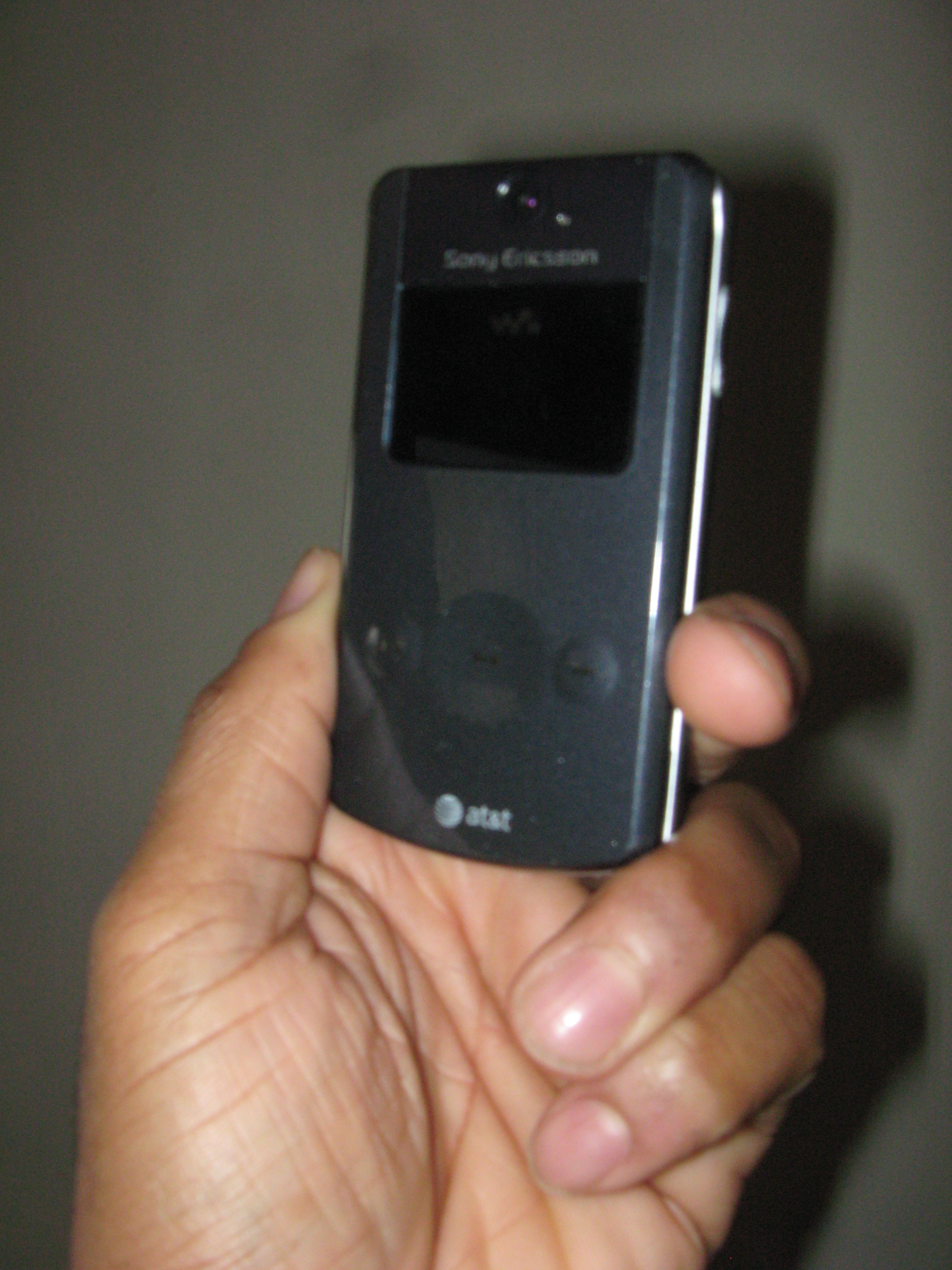
- Manufacturer: Sony Ericsson
- Availability by region: July 15, 2009 (Americas)
- Compatible networks: GSM/GPRS 850/900/1800/1900MHz 3G 850/1900/2100 MHz
- Form factor: Clamshell
- Dimensions: 3.7×1.9×0.6 in (94×48×15 mm)
- Weight: 3.35 oz (95 g)
- Memory: 100 MB Internal
- Removable storage: Extendable external memory using Memory Stick Micro.
- Battery: Lithium-ion
- Rear camera: 3.2-megapixel
- Display: 320x240 pixels 262K TFT QVGA display (262K colors)
- Connectivity: EDGE, Bluetooth 2.0 (JSR-82), HSDPA
- Development status: Active

The Sony Ericsson W518a (W508 for international regions) is a clamshell style mobile phone and media player in the Walkman series. The phone was released on July 15, 2009. Among its features are Voice-guided GPS, a 3.2-megapixel digital camera, a music player and a Facebook app. Sony Ericsson markets the phone as a phone that offers the "mobile entertainment experience". The phone also has an FM radio. In addition to black, the phone is also made in red.

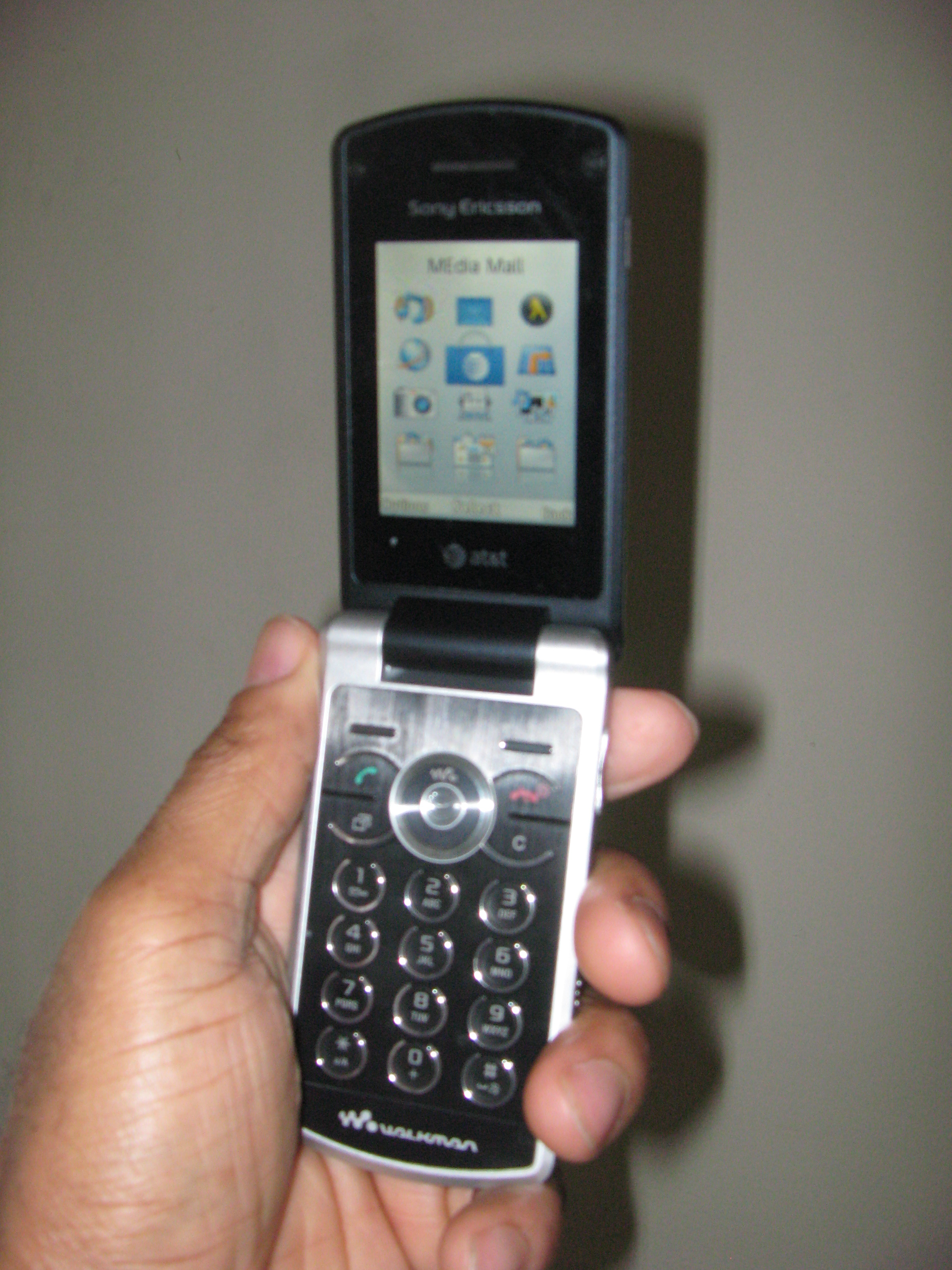
W518a in open position
