= Walkman Z Series =

Sony Walkman Z series
- Manufacturer: Sony Corporation
- Type: Portable media player
- Lifespan: 2011 – 2012
- Operating system: Android 2.3 "Gingerbread"
- Storage: 8GB (NWZ-Z1040); 16 GB (NWZ-Z1050); 32 GB (NWZ-Z1060); 64 GB (NWZ-Z1070)
- Display: 4.3 inches (11 cm)
- Connectivity: USB 2.0 Compliant; Wi-Fi (IEEE 802.11b/g); Bluetooth
- Predecessor: Walkman X series
- Successor: Walkman F series
- Related: Walkman

The Sony Walkman Z series is a discontinued Android 2.3-based portable media player manufactured as a part of Sony's Walkman line of music players. First announced in Japan on September 13, 2011, and going on sale the following December, it was announced for an American release by mid-2012 at the 2012 Consumer Electronics Show. It was the first Walkman that ran on the Android operating system.

The device was available in 8, 16, 32 and 64 gigabyte versions, and is equipped with a dual core one gigahertz Nvidia Tegra 2 processor, 512 megabytes of RAM, a 4.3-inch (11 cm) screen, WiFi, Bluetooth, GPS capabilities and a gyroscope. The 64 gigabyte versions are only available in some countries. It sports Sony's proprietary S-Master MX digital amplifier, and supports various audio and video formats. Some Japan models also include noise cancelling, as seen on the previous Walkman X series.

Only one generation of the Z series (NWZ-Z1000) was released, and in 2012 the Walkman F Series was introduced as its replacement.

== See also ==
- List of Sony Walkman products
