= Walkman A Series =

Digital audio players by Sony

The Walkman A Series is a flagship line of mid-range digital audio players (DAP) by Sony as part of its Walkman range. The A Series has been marketed since 2005, initially as the top spec Walkman players and since 2014 as a mid-range following the introduction of the ZX Series. The "A" originally stood for "All in one, Advanced, and Attractive".

== History ==
=== 2005–2008 ===
==== A3000 and A1000 ====
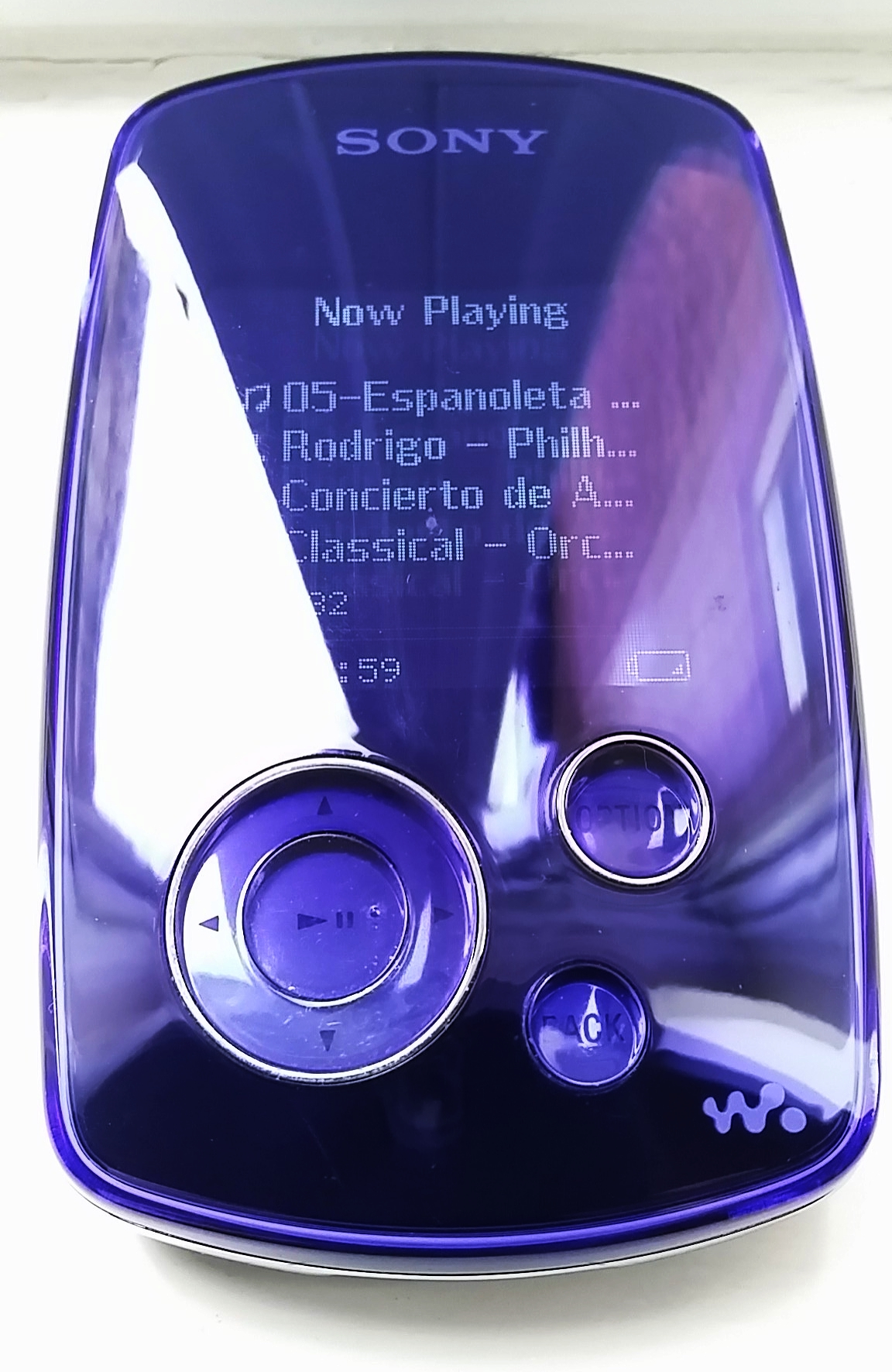
NW-A3000

The A Series digital music player was introduced on September 8, 2005. It was available initially in 6 gigabyte (NW-A1000) and a larger sized 20 gigabyte (NW-3000) versions, while an 8 gigabyte version (NW-A1200) was also released. They were the replacement of the NW-HD5 in the Network Walkman line and remained a hard disk player. The A Series was Sony's "rebirth" of the Walkman, and in its press release Sony said the series is "Simply called 'WALKMAN'" thereby dropping the Network name from all its future digital audio player (DAP) products. Its release date in Japan was November 19, 2005 with a retail price of 28,800 JPY while in the UK it retailed for about £190.

The NW-A3000 and NW-A1000 series feature an electroluminescent screen. The player is pebble-shaped and has a highly reflective front, build with a metallic back, and a generally minimalist style. It was available in black, silver, purple, pink and blue, Koichiro Tsujino, a Sony executive, said that the goal of the A Series was to revive the Walkman brand which had been struggling both domestically and internationally.

Battery life can reach 20 and 35 hours respectively. The player supports ATRAC3, MP3, WMA and from firmware version 3.00 it also supports AAC. There are a number of features to select music according to a variety of criteria, which Sony advertized as adapting to the listener's "individual tastes". The "Artist link" function prompts the Walkman to search, find and display similar artists in that genre. There are two new shuffle modes. By selecting "My Favourite Shuffle", the device automatically selects the 100 most listened to songs and plays them at random. The "Time Machine Shuffle" function randomly selects a year and plays all of the songs from that particular year currently held on the device. On the left side is an "Artist Link" button. A recent firmware update (V3.00) added the "Artist Link Shuffle" function to the list of Intelligent Shuffle modes, along with a clock and calendar. The means of putting music on this device (as with previous models) is to use Sony's SonicStage software, though originally at release it was a new piece of software called Connect Player which tied in with the Sony Connect online music store, or with mora in Japan.

Billed as Sony's much-anticipated answer to the iPod, the NW-A3000 and NW-A1000 series became a quick sales success in Japan and Europe and a big seller during the Christmas 2005 period. However, a significant number of customers had a negative experienced with the bundled Connect Player software, making them unable to transfer music, and reports of the software crashing their computers. In January 2006, Sony acknowledged "serious problems" with the software and advised customers to use SonicStage instead. The NW-A3000 and NW-A1000 series were the final HDD Walkman devices when it was discontinued in 2007; after this all Walkman digital audio players would be solely flash memory.

==== A600 ====
In Japan and some territories, the NW-A600 series were released alongside the NW-A3000/A1000. It is a small thumb drive design and successor to the global E Series NW-E500/E400. Future players in this style would be released under E Series (until 2008) and S Series (until 2007).

==== A800 ====
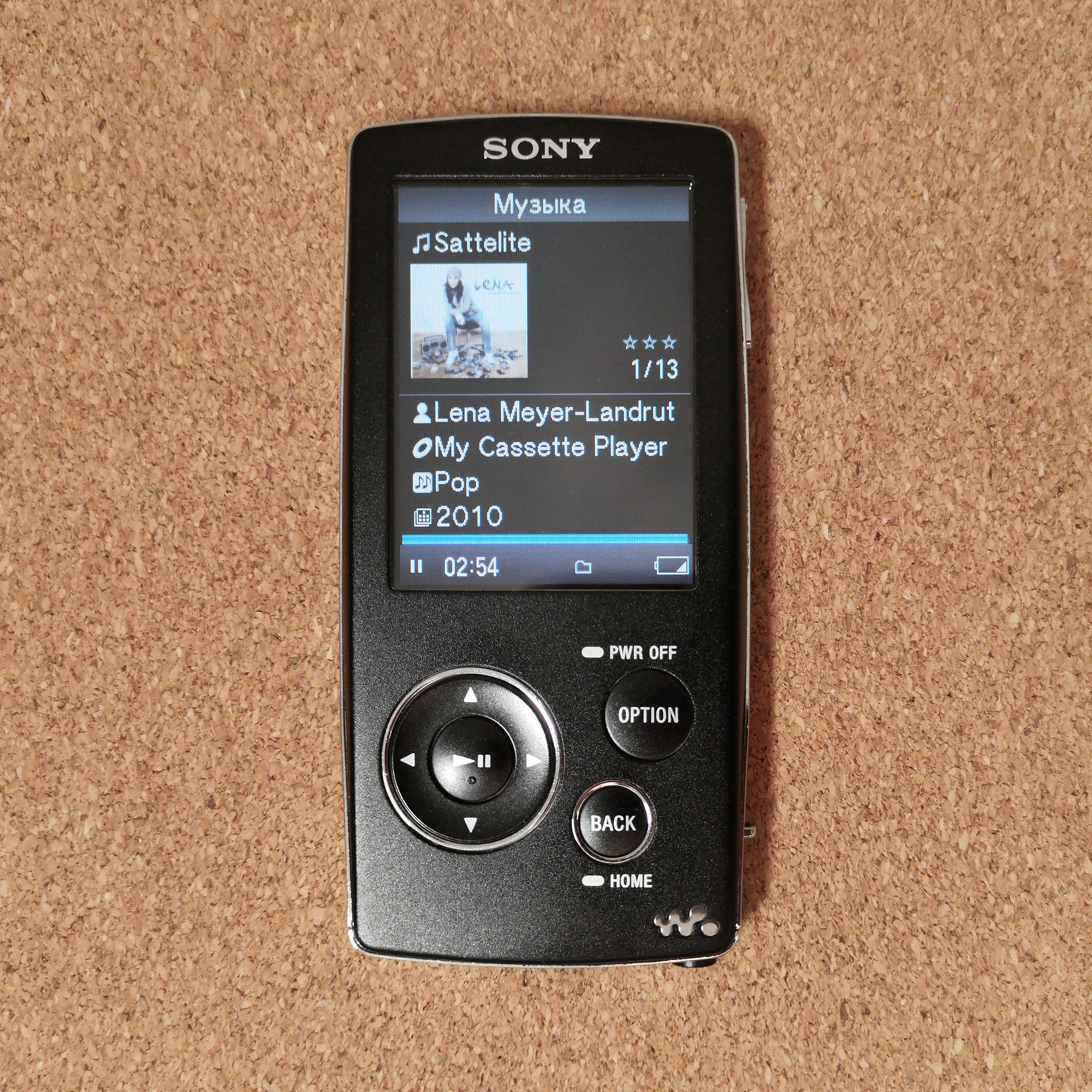
NW-A800 series (A805)

The Sony NW-A800 series was the first video-enabled Network Walkman. Announced on March 1, 2007, this series has a metallic build. A chrome-like strip surrounds the edge of the device, and accenting of the same style surrounds the buttons and makes up the logos on the front. It features a QVGA display with ID3 tag and album art support.

It is available in 2 GB (NW-805), 4 GB (NW-806), and 8 GB (NW-808) capacities. The interface is similar to that of a mobile phone. The screen is a 2.0-inch (51 mm) QVGA (240×320) colour LCD and can be used either horizontally or vertically. The Lithium-ion rechargeable battery can last up to 30 hours for music and 8 hours for video. This player is an ATRAC Audio Device which relies on SonicStage to manage music. For photo and video management it uses Sony's Image Converter. It also introduced the new 22-pin WM-PORT dock connector, replacing the 42-pin connector found on the predecessing A Series (A1000/1200/3000).

The NW-A800 has been released in the European Union, Asia, New Zealand, and North America. As of 19 May 2007, Sony Canada has released the 8 GB and 4 GB models. The 2 GB model was released on 13 June 2007.

==== A810 and A910 ====
Announced August 2007, the NW-810 hardware wise is the same as NW-A800 but introduces some substantial changes in its media manager software for the international market. The player was the first flagship to eliminate the need of Sony's proprietary SonicStage program, introducing a drag and drop feature to transfer media instead as well as native Windows Media Player support. It also no longer supports Sony's ATRAC format. Sony called the A810 as being built on an "open platform" and promoted it. It was also the first video-enabled Walkman in the U.S. market.

The NW-A919 is a 16GB video Walkman with a digital 1seg TV tuner and recorder allowing the recording of 16 hours of live broadcasts. The player has a touch screen, measures 47.2mm×86.0mm×12.3mm and was available in black or silver. It was released in Japan in November 2007. Tech press in the west nicknamed it TV Walkman.

==== A820 and A720 ====
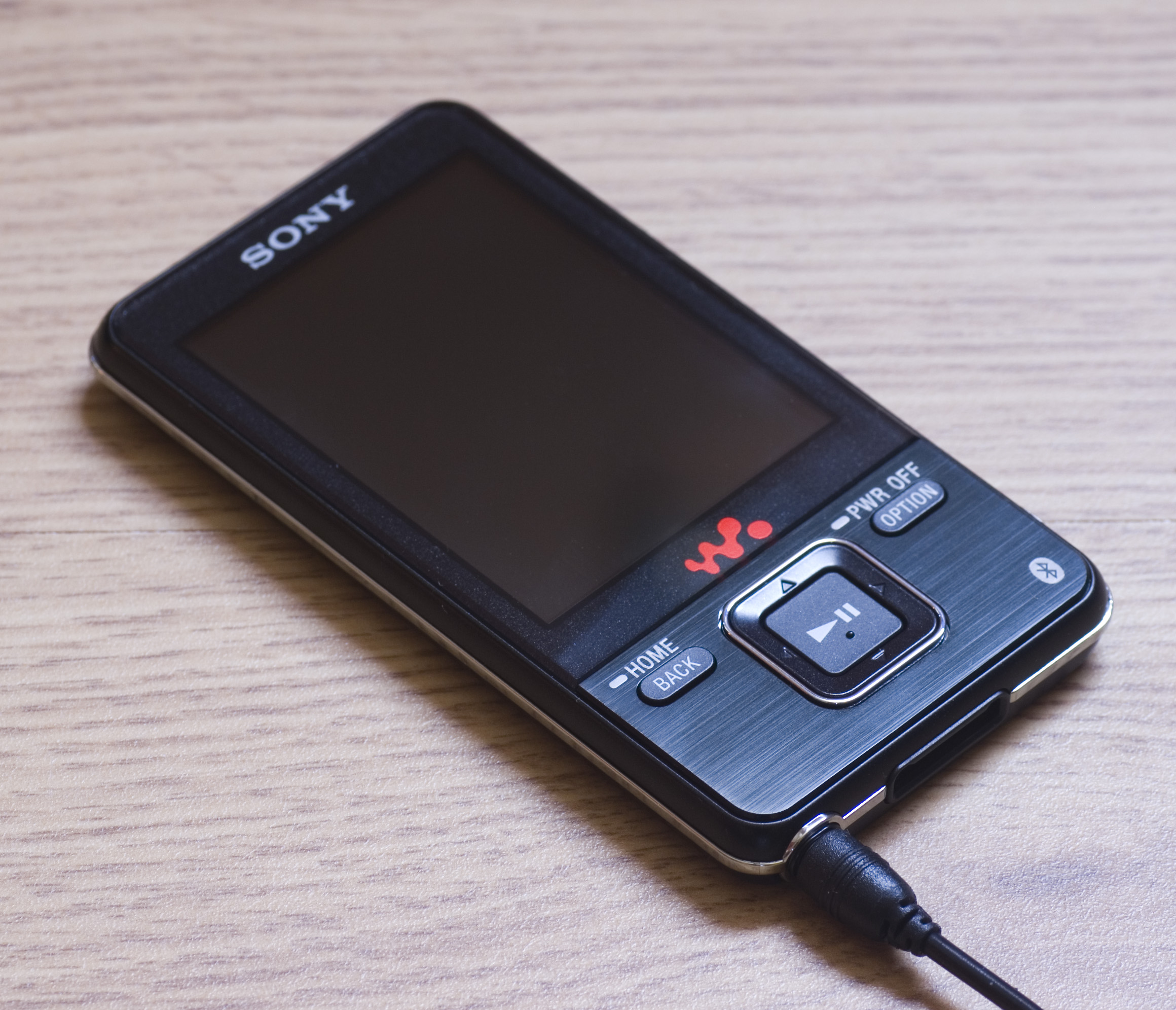
NWZ-A828 (2008)

In March 2008, Sony debuted A820 and A720 series. The A820 was the first Walkman equipped with a Bluetooth module which can be used to connect wireless headphones - the A720 lacks Bluetooth. The upgraded A820 and A720 had a 2.4" LCD and a selection of memory from 4 gigabytes to 16 gigabyte. This also includes the popular 8 GB version. In some regions the package will contain a pair of Sony In-Ear Earbuds with sound-reduction technology. The EX85 series earbuds are included in the US retail package. It did not include an FM radio, additional memory storage, or a voice recorder.

=== 2009–2011 ===
==== A840 ====
Introduced September 2009, the A840 Series was very thin (marketed as "Super Slim"), only 7.2 mm thick. It has a 2.8 inch OLED display; it was not filled with extras such as touchscreen or internet capabilities, which was reserved for the Walkman X Series. This was the first A Series to adopt the now familiar "Mickey Mouse" button layout that was first introduced in the E and S series the year before.

The A840 came in capacities of 8 gigabyte up to 64 gigabyte. It also introduced several new features, including a Language Learning function, a playlist bookmark function, and Virtual Phones Technology. It has rated 50 hours music playback time or 10 hours video playback time.

==== A850 ====
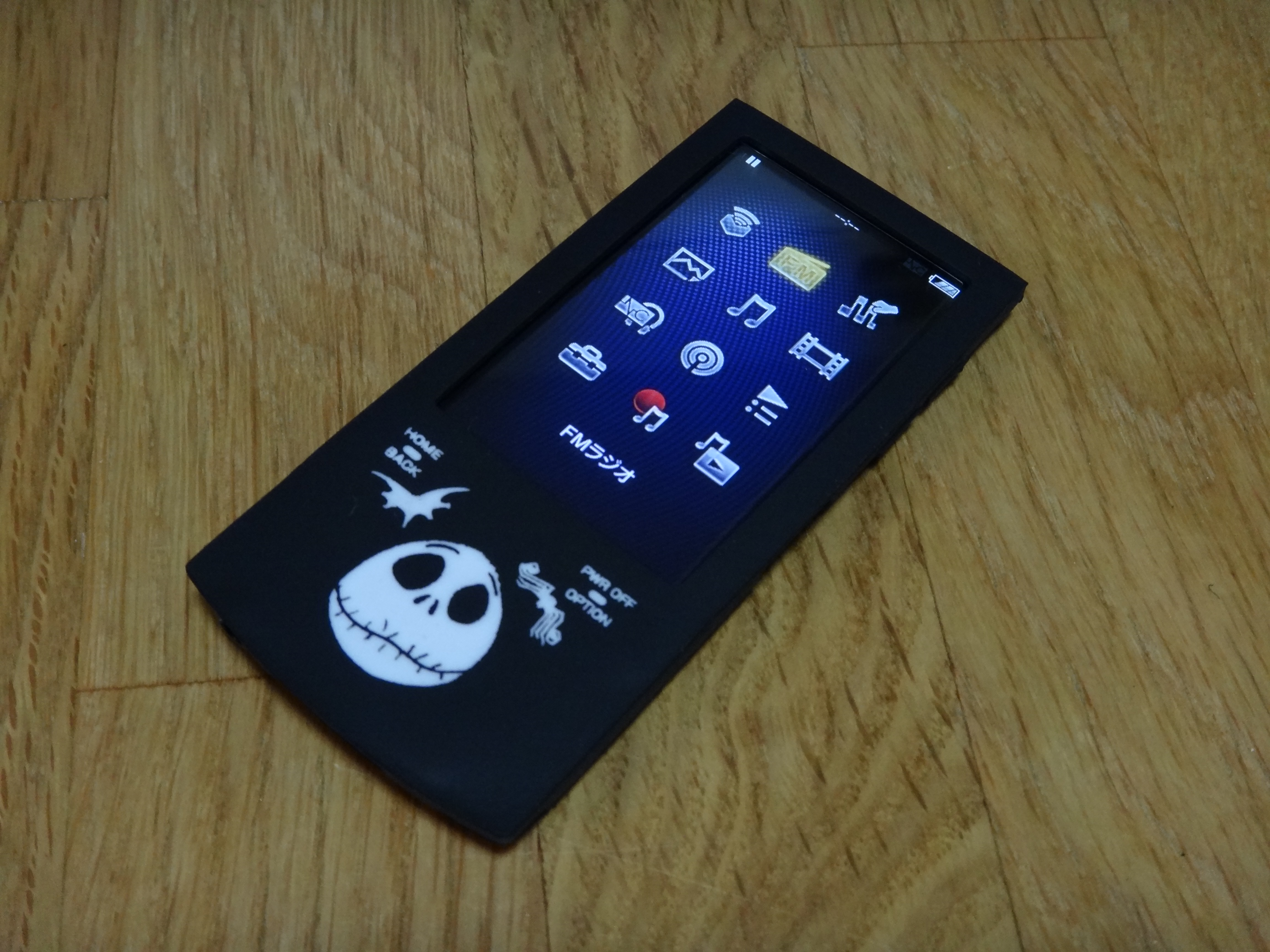
NW-A850 series, with case

The A850 Series was released in November 2010 exclusively in Japan for 24,000 yen (16 GB), 30,000 yen (32 GB) and 40,000 yen (64 GB).

==== A860 ====
The A860 Series was introduced in 2011 (alongside S760 and E460 series). It has a 2.8 inch LCD touchscreen and is styled like a contemporary smartphone. It introduced for the first time in the A Series the SensMe channels and Karaoke Mode functionality. After this model, the A Series was replaced by the F Series.

=== 2014–2019 ===
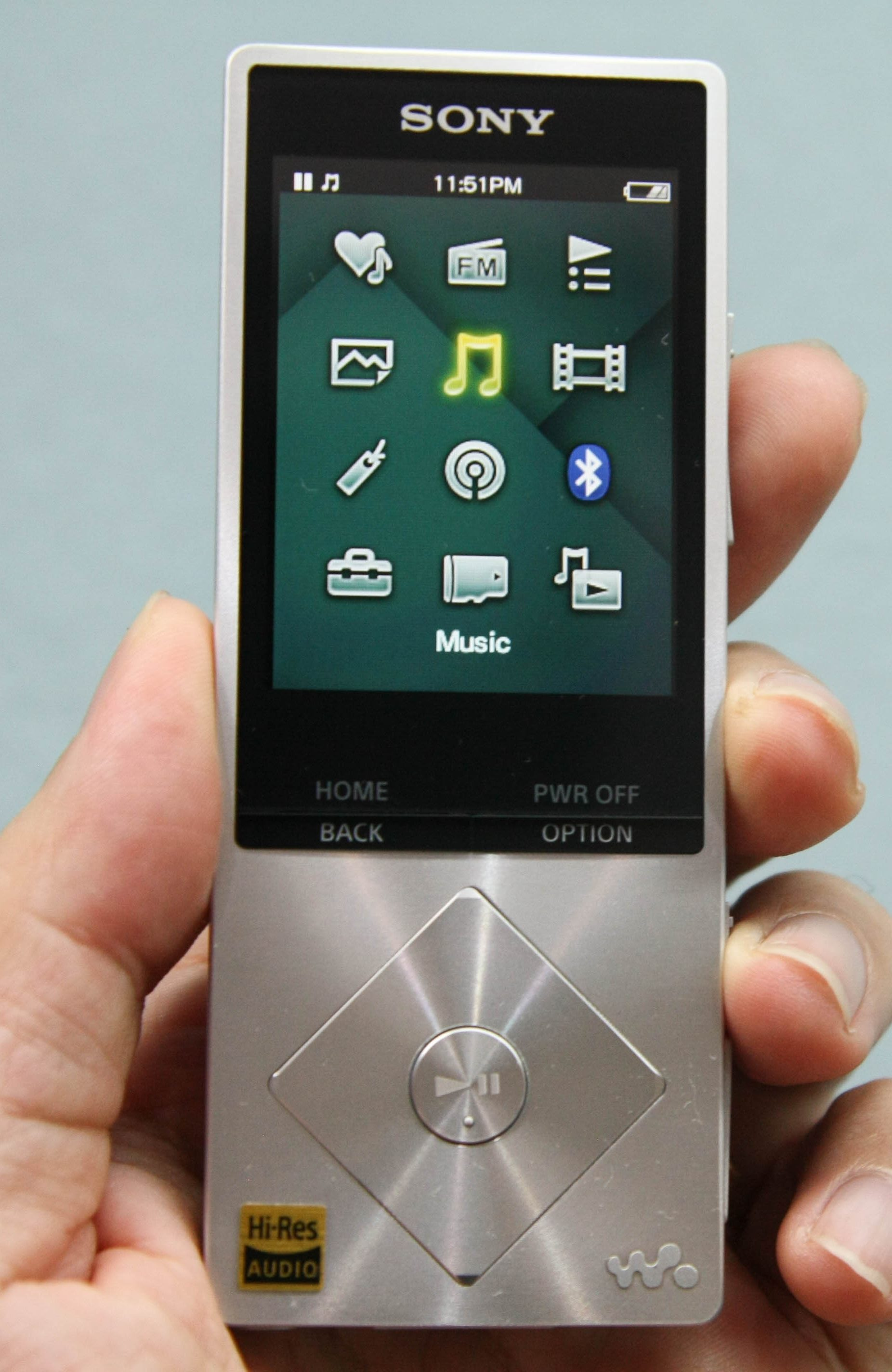
NWZ-A15

The A Series returned with the NWZ-A10 hi-res Walkman introduced in September 2014, with the ability to play 24-bit FLAC files as well as ALAC and DSD. It features Bluetooth and NFC. The player is small sized relative to smartphones of the time and has a 2.2 inch non-touch display, demonstrating the focus on a "classic" music player. The base NWZ-A15 16 GB model retailed for US$299.

Released in 2015 the A20 Series also has noise canceling.

Introduced in October 2016, the A30 Series can also playback Direct Stream Digital (DSD). It now has a 3.1 inch touchscreen display. It was followed by NW-A40 and NW-A50 series.

=== 2019–present ===
==== A100 and A300 ====
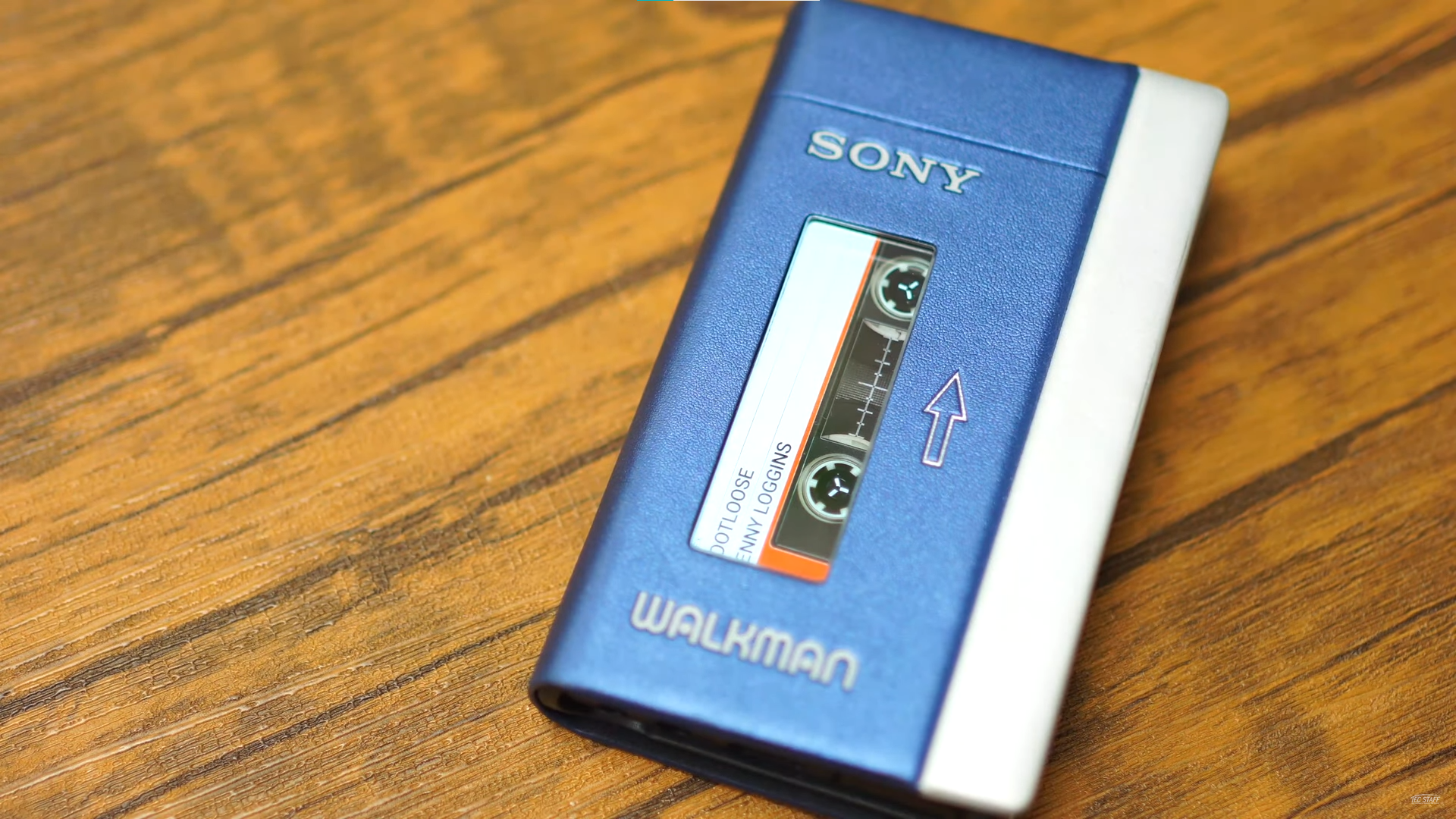
The 40th anniversary special edition of the NW-A100, with a soft cover that makes it resemble the TPS-L2 Walkman from 1979

At the 40th anniversary of the original Walkman, Sony introduced the NW-A100 series in September 2019. The A100 series has a similar design as the A50 but with a larger display and borrowing physical key designs from the NW-ZX300 - it includes a 3.6 inch display, 26 hours of audio playback, and both a 3.5 mm headphone and USB-C port, the latter replacing Sony's proprietary WM-PORT. Paying tribute to the original cassette player, the NW-A100 series players include a cassette tape splash screen that changes depending on what is played. There is, however, no FM radio present.

The limited edition anniversary model, NW-A100TPS (with the TPS paying homage to the model name of the 1979 Walkman), has a "40th Anniversary" logo on its back, as well as the very first Walkman logo. This edition comes with a soft cover, styled like the first Walkman.

The Japanese domestic model, for the first time, no longer has ATRAC audio support. In January 2023, the A300 was announced featuring a new sleek design, 36 hours of battery life, Android 12, USB DAC support and DSEE Ultimate. NFC and Noise Cancelling were removed from the A300. It came in Black, Grey and Blue. The NW-A306 retails for US$349.99.

== Specifications and comparison ==
Series (NW*-)	Image	Model	Capacity	Release Date (may differ by region)	Display	OS	Rated battery life (hours)	Supported audio formats	FM radio	Data/power connection (input/output)	Physical size	Weight
A3000 / A1000		NW-A1000	6 GB	November 19, 2005	1.5" OLED (monochrome)	N/A	Audio: 16–20	ATRAC, MP3, WMA, AAC(through update)	✗	Multi Terminal (42 pin) / USB	88.1 mm 55 mm 18.7 mm	109 g (3.9 oz)
A3000 / A1000		NW-A1200	8 GB	November 19, 2005	1.5" OLED (monochrome)	N/A	Audio: 16–20	ATRAC, MP3, WMA, AAC(through update)	✗	Multi Terminal (42 pin) / USB	88.1 mm 55 mm 18.7 mm	109 g (3.9 oz)
A3000 / A1000		NW-A3000	20 GB	November 19, 2005	2.0" OLED (monochrome)	N/A	Audio: 28–35	ATRAC, MP3, WMA, AAC(through update)	✗	Multi Terminal (42 pin) / USB	104.2 mm 65.2 mm 21.4 mm	182 g (6.5 oz)
A3000 / A1000		First A Series Walkman, successor of NW-HD-5. Hard disk based. 6-band equaliser.										
A600		NW-A605	512 MB	November 19, 2005	3-line OLED monochrome	N/A	Audio: 45–50	ATRAC, MP3, WMA	✓	Mini-B USB / USB	28.8 mm 84.9 mm 13.9 mm	47 g (1.66 oz)
A600		NW-A607	1 GB	November 19, 2005	3-line OLED monochrome	N/A	Audio: 45–50	ATRAC, MP3, WMA	✓	Mini-B USB / USB	28.8 mm 84.9 mm 13.9 mm	47 g (1.66 oz)
A600		NW-A608	2 GB	November 19, 2005	3-line OLED monochrome	N/A	Audio: 45–50	ATRAC, MP3, WMA	✓	Mini-B USB / USB	28.8 mm 84.9 mm 13.9 mm	47 g (1.66 oz)
A600		Successor of the NW-E500. Flash based. The only A Series player in a non-bar form factor.										
A800		NW-A805	2 GB	March 21, 2007	2" TFT LCD; 240 x 320 (QVGA)	N/A	Audio: 27–30; Video: 7	ATRAC, MP3, WMA, AAC	✗	WM-PORT / USB	88 mm 43.8 mm 9.1 mm	53 g (1.87 oz)
A800		NW-A806	4 GB	March 21, 2007	2" TFT LCD; 240 x 320 (QVGA)	N/A	Audio: 27–30; Video: 7	ATRAC, MP3, WMA, AAC	✗	WM-PORT / USB	88 mm 43.8 mm 9.1 mm	53 g (1.87 oz)
A800		NW-A808	8 GB	March 21, 2007	2" TFT LCD; 240 x 320 (QVGA)	N/A	Audio: 27–30; Video: 7	ATRAC, MP3, WMA, AAC	✗	WM-PORT / USB	88 mm 43.8 mm 9.1 mm	53 g (1.87 oz)
A800		Colour display. Video-playing capability added. ATRAC Advanced Lossless support. DSEE and Clear Audio technologies added.										
A810		NWZ-A815	2 GB	September 2007	2" TFT LCD; 240 x 320 (QVGA)	N/A	Audio: 33; Video: 8	MP3, WMA, AAC	✗	WM-PORT / USB	88 mm 44.5 mm 9.6 mm	53 g (1.87 oz)
A810		NWZ-A816	4 GB	September 2007	2" TFT LCD; 240 x 320 (QVGA)	N/A	Audio: 33; Video: 8	MP3, WMA, AAC	✗	WM-PORT / USB	88 mm 44.5 mm 9.6 mm	53 g (1.87 oz)
A810		NWZ-A818	8 GB	September 2007	2" TFT LCD; 240 x 320 (QVGA)	N/A	Audio: 33; Video: 8	MP3, WMA, AAC	✗	WM-PORT / USB	88 mm 44.5 mm 9.6 mm	53 g (1.87 oz)
A810		Removal of ATRAC support. Works with Windows Media Player 11 instead of SonicStage. First video Walkman released in North America. Not released in Japan.										
A820 / A720 / A910 (Japan)		NWZ-A726	4 GB	March 20, 2008	2.4" TFT LCD; 240 x 320 (QVGA)	N/A	Audio: 36; Video: 10	MP3, WMA, AAC, ATRAC (Japanese market)	✗	WM-PORT / USB	93.6 mm 50.2 mm 9.3 mm	58 g (2.05 oz)
A820 / A720 / A910 (Japan)		NWZ-A728	8 GB	March 20, 2008	2.4" TFT LCD; 240 x 320 (QVGA)	N/A	Audio: 36; Video: 10	MP3, WMA, AAC, ATRAC (Japanese market)	✗	WM-PORT / USB	93.6 mm 50.2 mm 9.3 mm	58 g (2.05 oz)
A820 / A720 / A910 (Japan)		NWZ-A729	16 GB	March 20, 2008	2.4" TFT LCD; 240 x 320 (QVGA)	N/A	Audio: 36; Video: 10	MP3, WMA, AAC, ATRAC (Japanese market)	✗	WM-PORT / USB	93.6 mm 50.2 mm 9.3 mm	58 g (2.05 oz)
A820 / A720 / A910 (Japan)		NWZ-A826	4 GB	March 20, 2008	2.4" TFT LCD; 240 x 320 (QVGA)	N/A	Audio: 36; Video: 10	MP3, WMA, AAC, ATRAC (Japanese market)	✗	WM-PORT / USB	93.6 mm 50.2 mm 9.3 mm	58 g (2.05 oz)
A820 / A720 / A910 (Japan)		NWZ-A828	8 GB	March 20, 2008	2.4" TFT LCD; 240 x 320 (QVGA)	N/A	Audio: 36; Video: 10	MP3, WMA, AAC, ATRAC (Japanese market)	✗	WM-PORT / USB	93.6 mm 50.2 mm 9.3 mm	58 g (2.05 oz)
A820 / A720 / A910 (Japan)		NWZ-A829	16 GB	March 20, 2008	2.4" TFT LCD; 240 x 320 (QVGA)	N/A	Audio: 36; Video: 10	MP3, WMA, AAC, ATRAC (Japanese market)	✗	WM-PORT / USB	93.6 mm 50.2 mm 9.3 mm	58 g (2.05 oz)
A820 / A720 / A910 (Japan)		NW-A916	4 GB	November 17, 2007	2.4" TFT LCD; 240 x 320 (QVGA)	N/A	Audio: 31–36; Video: 10–13 TV broadcast: 6-8	ATRAC, MP3, WMA, AAC	✗	WM-PORT / USB	86.8 mm 48.3 mm 12.3 mm	74 g (2.81 oz)
A820 / A720 / A910 (Japan)		NW-A918	8 GB	November 17, 2007	2.4" TFT LCD; 240 x 320 (QVGA)	N/A	Audio: 31–36; Video: 10–13 TV broadcast: 6-8	ATRAC, MP3, WMA, AAC	✗	WM-PORT / USB	86.8 mm 48.3 mm 12.3 mm	74 g (2.81 oz)
A820 / A720 / A910 (Japan)		NW-A919	16 GB	November 17, 2007	2.4" TFT LCD; 240 x 320 (QVGA)	N/A	Audio: 31–36; Video: 10–13 TV broadcast: 6-8	ATRAC, MP3, WMA, AAC	✗	WM-PORT / USB	86.8 mm 48.3 mm 12.3 mm	74 g (2.81 oz)
A820 / A720 / A910 (Japan)		Bluetooth functionality added (A820 only). A820 also adds noise cancelling over A720. A910 in Japan includes 1seg television tuner.										
A840		NWZ-A844	8 GB	October 31, 2009	2.8" OLED; 240 x 400 (WQVGA)	N/A	Audio: 29; Video: 9	MP3, WMA, AAC, ATRAC (Japanese market)	✓	WM-PORT / USB	104.9 mm 46.8 mm 7.2 mm	62 g (2.19 oz)
A840		NWZ-A845	16 GB	October 31, 2009	2.8" OLED; 240 x 400 (WQVGA)	N/A	Audio: 29; Video: 9	MP3, WMA, AAC, ATRAC (Japanese market)	✓	WM-PORT / USB	104.9 mm 46.8 mm 7.2 mm	62 g (2.19 oz)
A840		NWZ-A846	32 GB	October 31, 2009	2.8" OLED; 240 x 400 (WQVGA)	N/A	Audio: 29; Video: 9	MP3, WMA, AAC, ATRAC (Japanese market)	✓	WM-PORT / USB	104.9 mm 46.8 mm 7.2 mm	62 g (2.19 oz)
A840		NWZ-A847	64 GB	October 31, 2009	2.8" OLED; 240 x 400 (WQVGA)	N/A	Audio: 29; Video: 9	MP3, WMA, AAC, ATRAC (Japanese market)	✓	WM-PORT / USB	104.9 mm 46.8 mm 7.2 mm	62 g (2.19 oz)
A840		First A Series Walkman with S-Master Digital Amplifier technology (second Walkman after X Series). FM radio tuner added.										62 g (2.19 oz)
A850 (Japan)		NW-A855	16 GB	November 13, 2010	2.8" OLED; 240 x 400 (WQVGA)	N/A	Audio: 19–29; Video: 9–11	ATRAC, MP3, WMA, AAC	✓	WM-PORT / USB	104.9 mm 46.8 mm 7.2 mm	62 g (2.19 oz)
A850 (Japan)		NW-A856	32 GB	November 13, 2010	2.8" OLED; 240 x 400 (WQVGA)	N/A	Audio: 19–29; Video: 9–11	ATRAC, MP3, WMA, AAC	✓	WM-PORT / USB	104.9 mm 46.8 mm 7.2 mm	62 g (2.19 oz)
A850 (Japan)		NW-A857	64 GB	November 13, 2010	2.8" OLED; 240 x 400 (WQVGA)	N/A	Audio: 19–29; Video: 9–11	ATRAC, MP3, WMA, AAC	✓	WM-PORT / USB	104.9 mm 46.8 mm 7.2 mm	62 g (2.19 oz)
A850 (Japan)		Same design as A840.										62 g (2.19 oz)
A860		NWZ-A864	8 GB	October 8, 2011	2.8" TFT LCD; 240 x 400 (WQVGA)	N/A	Audio: 20–23; Video: 4–5	MP3, WMA, AAC, ATRAC (Japanese market)	✓	WM-PORT / USB	96.9 mm 51.8 mm 9.3 mm	77 g (2.72 oz)
A860		NWZ-A865	16 GB	October 8, 2011	2.8" TFT LCD; 240 x 400 (WQVGA)	N/A	Audio: 20–23; Video: 4–5	MP3, WMA, AAC, ATRAC (Japanese market)	✓	WM-PORT / USB	96.9 mm 51.8 mm 9.3 mm	77 g (2.72 oz)
A860		NWZ-A866	32 GB	October 8, 2011	2.8" TFT LCD; 240 x 400 (WQVGA)	N/A	Audio: 20–23; Video: 4–5	MP3, WMA, AAC, ATRAC (Japanese market)	✓	WM-PORT / USB	96.9 mm 51.8 mm 9.3 mm	77 g (2.72 oz)
A860		NWZ-A867	64 GB	October 8, 2011	2.8" TFT LCD; 240 x 400 (WQVGA)	N/A	Audio: 20–23; Video: 4–5	MP3, WMA, AAC, ATRAC (Japanese market)	✓	WM-PORT / USB	96.9 mm 51.8 mm 9.3 mm	77 g (2.72 oz)
A860		Final A Series player before replacement by F Series.										77 g (2.72 oz)
A10		NWZ-A15	16 GB	November 8, 2014	2.2" TFT LCD; 320 x 240 (QVGA)	N/A	Audio: 30–50; Video:	MP3, WMA, AAC, FLAC, ALAC, AIFF, ATRAC (Japanese market)	✓	WM-PORT / USB	110 mm 43 mm 8 mm	66 g (2.33 oz)
A10		NW-A16	32 GB	November 8, 2014	2.2" TFT LCD; 320 x 240 (QVGA)	N/A	Audio: 30–50; Video:	MP3, WMA, AAC, FLAC, ALAC, AIFF, ATRAC (Japanese market)	✓	WM-PORT / USB	110 mm 43 mm 8 mm	66 g (2.33 oz)
A10		NWZ-A17	64 GB	November 8, 2014	2.2" TFT LCD; 320 x 240 (QVGA)	N/A	Audio: 30–50; Video:	MP3, WMA, AAC, FLAC, ALAC, AIFF, ATRAC (Japanese market)	✓	WM-PORT / USB	110 mm 43 mm 8 mm	66 g (2.33 oz)
A10		First model of revived A Series, successor of NWZ-F880. First A Series with NFC connectivity, Direct Stream Digital (DSD) technology added, support for FLAC and ALAC audio formats, and MicroSD slot. LDAC support (via update).										66 g (2.33 oz)
A20		NW-A25*	16 GB	October 10, 2015	2.2" TFT LCD; 320 x 240 (QVGA)	N/A	Audio: 30–50; Video: 10–14	MP3, WMA, AAC, FLAC, ALAC, AIFF, ATRAC (Japanese market)	✓	WM-PORT / USB	109 mm 43.6 mm 8.7 mm	66 g (2.33 oz)
A20		NW-A26HN	32 GB	October 10, 2015	2.2" TFT LCD; 320 x 240 (QVGA)	N/A	Audio: 30–50; Video: 10–14	MP3, WMA, AAC, FLAC, ALAC, AIFF, ATRAC (Japanese market)	✓	WM-PORT / USB	109 mm 43.6 mm 8.7 mm	66 g (2.33 oz)
A20		NW-A27HN	64 GB	October 10, 2015	2.2" TFT LCD; 320 x 240 (QVGA)	N/A	Audio: 30–50; Video: 10–14	MP3, WMA, AAC, FLAC, ALAC, AIFF, ATRAC (Japanese market)	✓	WM-PORT / USB	109 mm 43.6 mm 8.7 mm	66 g (2.33 oz)
A20		Digital noise cancellation. Support for LDAC.										66 g (2.33 oz)
A30		NW-A35*	16 GB	October 29, 2016	3.1" TFT LCD; 800 x 480 (WVGA)	N/A	Audio: 22–45	MP3, WMA, AAC, FLAC, ALAC, AIFF, DSD, ATRAC (Japanese market)	✓	WM-PORT / USB	97.5 mm 55.9 mm 10.9 mm	98 g (3.46 oz)
A30		NW-A36HN	32 GB	October 29, 2016	3.1" TFT LCD; 800 x 480 (WVGA)	N/A	Audio: 22–45	MP3, WMA, AAC, FLAC, ALAC, AIFF, DSD, ATRAC (Japanese market)	✓	WM-PORT / USB	97.5 mm 55.9 mm 10.9 mm	98 g (3.46 oz)
A30		NW-A37HN	64 GB	October 29, 2016	3.1" TFT LCD; 800 x 480 (WVGA)	N/A	Audio: 22–45	MP3, WMA, AAC, FLAC, ALAC, AIFF, DSD, ATRAC (Japanese market)	✓	WM-PORT / USB	97.5 mm 55.9 mm 10.9 mm	98 g (3.46 oz)
A30		New touchscreen based design and operation.										98 g (3.46 oz)
A40		NW-A45*	16 GB	October 7, 2017	3.1" TFT LCD; 800 x 480 (WVGA)	N/A	Audio: 30–50	MP3, WMA, AAC, FLAC, ALAC, AIFF, DSD, APE, MQA, ATRAC (Japanese market)	✓	WM-PORT / USB	97.5 mm 55.9 mm 10.9 mm	98 g (3.46 oz)
A40		NW-A46HN	32 GB	October 7, 2017	3.1" TFT LCD; 800 x 480 (WVGA)	N/A	Audio: 30–50	MP3, WMA, AAC, FLAC, ALAC, AIFF, DSD, APE, MQA, ATRAC (Japanese market)	✓	WM-PORT / USB	97.5 mm 55.9 mm 10.9 mm	98 g (3.46 oz)
A40		NW-A47	64 GB	October 7, 2017	3.1" TFT LCD; 800 x 480 (WVGA)	N/A	Audio: 30–50	MP3, WMA, AAC, FLAC, ALAC, AIFF, DSD, APE, MQA, ATRAC (Japanese market)	✓	WM-PORT / USB	97.5 mm 55.9 mm 10.9 mm	98 g (3.46 oz)
A40		aptX and USB DAC support.										98 g (3.46 oz)
A50		NW-A55*	16 GB	October 6, 2018	3.1" TFT LCD; 800 x 480 (WVGA)	N/A	Audio: 30–50	MP3, WMA, AAC, FLAC, ALAC, AIFF, DSD, APE, MQA, ATRAC (Japanese market)	check	WM-PORT / USB	97.3 mm 55.7 mm 10.8 mm	99 g (3.5 oz)
A50		NW-A56*	32 GB	October 6, 2018	3.1" TFT LCD; 800 x 480 (WVGA)	N/A	Audio: 30–50	MP3, WMA, AAC, FLAC, ALAC, AIFF, DSD, APE, MQA, ATRAC (Japanese market)	check	WM-PORT / USB	97.3 mm 55.7 mm 10.8 mm	99 g (3.5 oz)
A50		NW-A57*	64 GB	October 6, 2018	3.1" TFT LCD; 800 x 480 (WVGA)	N/A	Audio: 30–50	MP3, WMA, AAC, FLAC, ALAC, AIFF, DSD, APE, MQA, ATRAC (Japanese market)	check	WM-PORT / USB	97.3 mm 55.7 mm 10.8 mm	99 g (3.5 oz)
A50		More slim edges, FM radio on all models except NW-A55L. Functional Bluetooth beam.										99 g (3.5 oz)
A100		NW-A100TPS	16 GB	November 14, 2019	3.6" TFT LCD; 1280 x 720 (HD)	Android 9	Audio: 8-26	MP3, WMA, AAC, FLAC, ALAC, AIFF, DSD	✗	USB-C / USB	98.9 mm 55.9 mm 11 mm	103 g (3.64 oz)
A100		NW-A105*	16 GB	November 2, 2019	3.6" TFT LCD; 1280 x 720 (HD)	Android 9	Audio: 8-26	MP3, WMA, AAC, FLAC, ALAC, AIFF, DSD	✗	USB-C / USB	98.9 mm 55.9 mm 11 mm	103 g (3.64 oz)
A100		NW-A106*	32 GB	November 2, 2019	3.6" TFT LCD; 1280 x 720 (HD)	Android 9	Audio: 8-26	MP3, WMA, AAC, FLAC, ALAC, AIFF, DSD	✗	USB-C / USB	98.9 mm 55.9 mm 11 mm	103 g (3.64 oz)
A100		NW-A107*	64 GB	November 2, 2019	3.6" TFT LCD; 1280 x 720 (HD)	Android 9	Audio: 8-26	MP3, WMA, AAC, FLAC, ALAC, AIFF, DSD	✗	USB-C / USB	98.9 mm 55.9 mm 11 mm	103 g (3.64 oz)
A100		First A Series player running Android OS software. WM-PORT terminal replaced with USB Type C. No FM radio, SensMe, or Japanese ATRAC support.										103 g (3.64 oz)
A300		NW-A306	32 GB	January 27, 2023 (Japan)	3.6" TFT LCD; 1280 x 720 (HD)	Initially released with Android 12, can be updated to Android 13 and Android 14	Audio: 11–36	MP3, WMA, AAC, FLAC, ALAC, AIFF, DSD	✗	USB-C / USB	98.4 mm 56.5 mm 11.8 mm	113 g (3.99 oz)
A300		NW-A307	64 GB	January 27, 2023 (Japan)	3.6" TFT LCD; 1280 x 720 (HD)	Initially released with Android 12, can be updated to Android 13 and Android 14	Audio: 11–36	MP3, WMA, AAC, FLAC, ALAC, AIFF, DSD	✗	USB-C / USB	98.4 mm 56.5 mm 11.8 mm	113 g (3.99 oz)
A300		New sleek design, USB DAC support, and DSEE Ultimate. No NFC and Noise Cancelling										113 g (3.99 oz)

== See also ==
- Walkman S Series
- Walkman X Series
- Walkman ZX Series
- List of Sony Walkman products
