= Walkman X series =

Portable media player

Sony Walkman X series

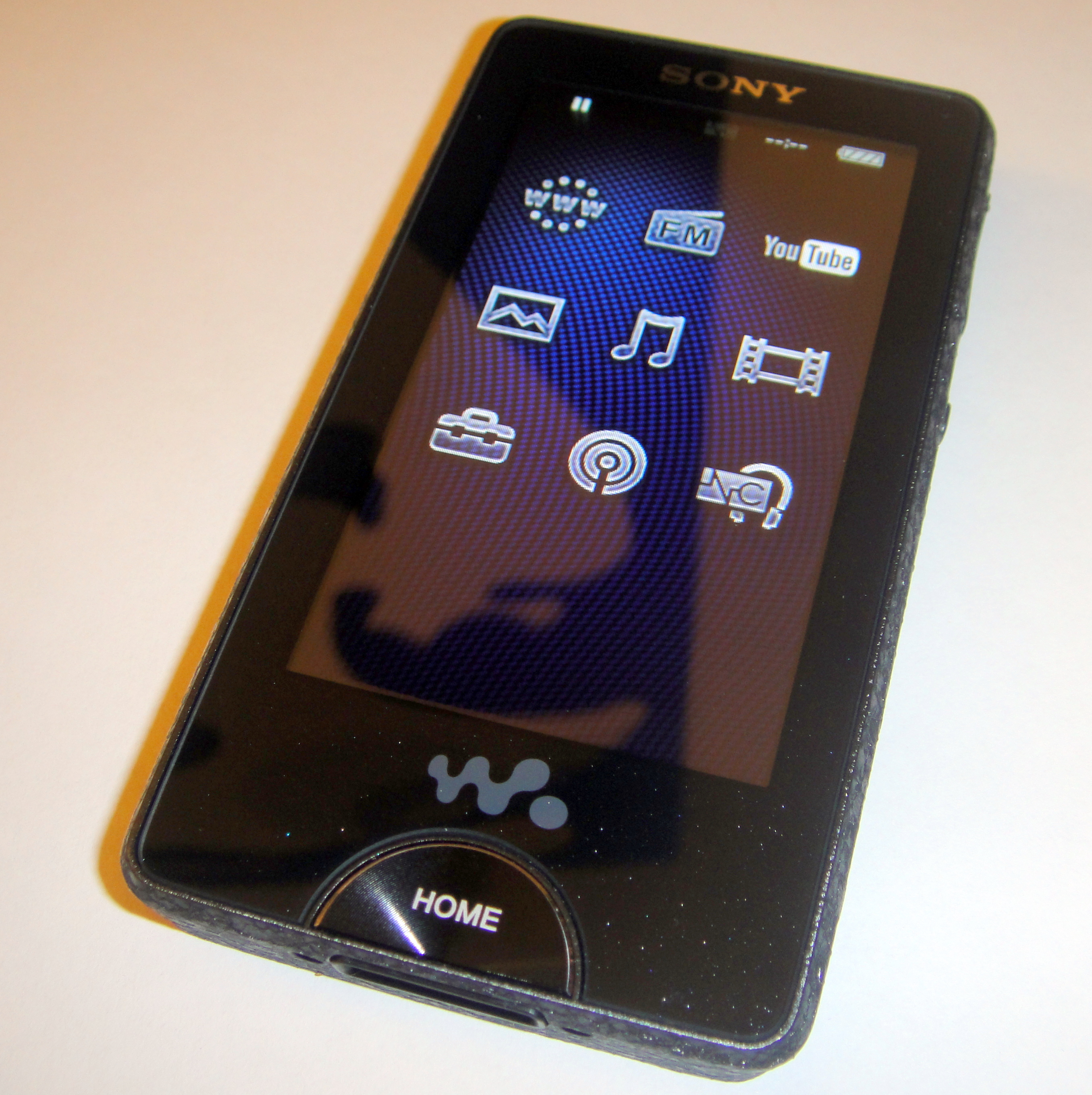
- NWZ-X1060
- Manufacturer: Sony Corporation
- Type: Portable Media Player
- Operating system: Sony Proprietary OS
- Storage: 16 GB (NWZ-X1051); 32 GB (NWZ-X1061)
- Display: 3" OLED Touch Screen; 432x240 262,144 Colors
- Connectivity: WM-PORT; USB 2.0 Compliant; Wi-Fi (IEEE 802.11b/g)
- Power: Li-ion battery Non User Replaceable
- Dimensions: 2.13 x 3.87 x 0.38 inches
- Weight: 3.5 oz.
- Successor: Sony Walkman Z series
- Related: Walkman

The Walkman X series is a portable music player designed and released by Sony in Japan in 2009. It was marketed as a high-end, internet-enabled model in the Walkman digital player family in 2009. The model debuted in Japan in April 2009, and then became available in North America, Europe, China and also other regions. The Walkman X series was the first Walkman device to feature a touch screen and S-Master digital amplifier technologies.

Only one generation of the X series was released, making up two models: the 16 GB NWZ-X1050 and the 32 GB NWZ-X1060 (in the US, NWZ-X1051 and NWZ-X1061 respectively). A limited version of the Walkman X series was released only in Japan, with a slightly different design and a higher price. In 2011, it was succeeded by the Walkman Z series.

== Design ==
The design features a glass front screen cover rather than plastic. The side consists of a granite-like texture. It measures 3.8 inches by 2.1 inches by 0.4 inch and weighs 98 g. Although primarily designed for touch screen operation, the Walkman X has play/pause and track shuttle buttons on the top side, and a volume rocker on the right edge. The bottom contains the proprietary WM-Port-to-USB connector and the 'hold' switch is on the back.

== Control and navigation ==
The player uses a tilted scrolling effect for video and album art. The user navigates through the items stored on the Walkman by sliding the fingers over the screen and tapping to select an item. The separate buttons for volume, play and track navigation allow use in a pocket or by the visually impaired. The main functions are laid out as icons on the main screen. 'Music Menu' lists songs, artists, albums and genres. A soft key that at the bottom of all music screens allows selection of various sub-menus, including a folder browser option.

== Sound quality ==
The Walkman X series includes an S-Master amplifier which is a form of Switching amplifier (also known as Class D). It also features some proprietary Sony technologies including DSEE (to predict and restore high frequencies lost during audio compression), Clear Bass (to enhance bass levels while minimizing distortion at high volume) and Clear Stereo (to provide improved channel separation with open type headphones). There is also a built-in ambient-noise cancelling feature which cancels noise picked up from small microphones on the outside of the supplied earphones. These technologies are forms of digital signal processing.

== Web browser ==
The Walkman X player is the first to feature a web browser. The device doesn't support flash video, although it has a separate application for YouTube video playback. The web browser is based on NetFront, which is also used on the PlayStation Portable.

== Reception ==
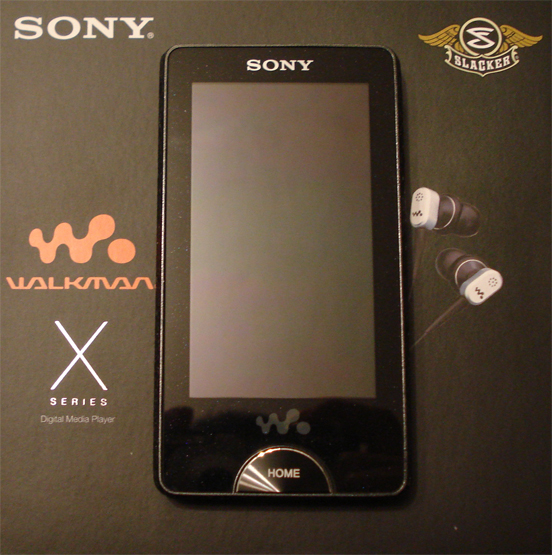
With box

The Walkman X's notable market rivals at the time of launch were iPod Touch, Cowon S9 and Samsung P3.

== Specifications ==
- 3.0 inch OLED screen, 432×240 pixels resolution, 262.000 colors.
- Battery life: up to 33 hours on music playback or 9 hours on video playback. Battery fully charged in three hours.
- FM Radio.
- Wi-Fi 802.11b/g.
- Music files: MP3, WMA, AAC up to 320 kbit/s, WAV, and VBR files.
- Video files: H.264, MPEG-4 (.mp4), WMV.
- Image files: JPEG.
- Sound systems: S-Master amplifier, DSEE, Noice Cancelling System, Clear Stereo.
- Features: Web browser, Related section, wallpaper customization, RSS reader, Podcasts support, Noise Cancelling system.
- Capacity: 16 or 32 GB flash memory.
- Design and colors: Granite imitation pattern in black and silver (buttons and details)
