= Sony Ericsson W980 =

Mobile phone model

Sony Ericsson w980
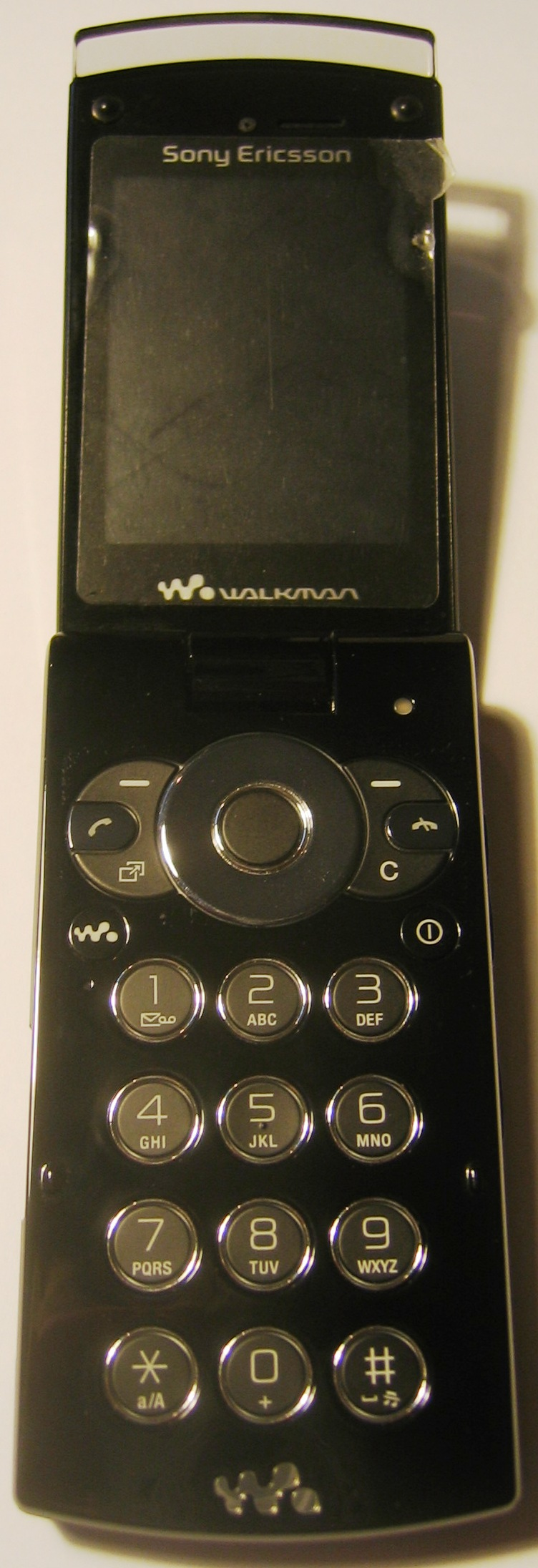
- Manufacturer: Sony Ericsson
- First released: 11 February 2008; 18 years ago
- Predecessor: Sony Ericsson W960
- Successor: Sony Ericsson W995
- Compatible networks: -GSM (850/900/1800/1900) -GPRS -Quad band EDGE -UMTS 2100 -HSDPA 2100
- Form factor: Clamshell
- Dimensions: 92×46×17 mm (3.62×1.81×0.67 in)
- Weight: 100 g
- Operating system: Sony Ericsson proprietary OS
- Memory: 8 GB internal
- Rear camera: 3.2 megapixel
- Display: 2.4" 262,144 TFT LCD; 240x320 pixels
- Connectivity: -Bluetooth (2.0) -USB (2.0 proprietary)

Short video showing the switched-off phone from various perspectives

The Sony Ericsson W980 is a clamshell mobile phone that was announced on 10 February 2008. It was their flagship Walkman device at the time. The W980 is packed with many features, including 8-gigabytes of flash memory, HSDPA and a built-in FM transmitter (one of the very earliest on the market). The exterior of the clamshell features physical playback controls and an external touch screen illuminated with orange lights which will flash to the rhythm of the music being played. The phone has a 3.2 megapixel rear camera. Picture DJ allows on-device image editing, automatic enhancement and rotation of photos. A front facing camera enables video calling.

== Features ==
=== Audio ===
- 9 Walkman equalizer presets
- Ability to manually edit equalizer
- FM transmitter
- SensMe
- TrackID
- Sound recorder
- MusicDJ

=== Rear camera ===
- 3.2 megapixel
- Night mode
- Self-timer
- Automatic or manual white balance
- Geotagging
- VideoDJ
- PhotoDJ
