= Walkman ZX Series =

Digital audio players sold by Sony

The Walkman ZX Series is a line of premium high-end digital audio players designed and developed by Sony since 2013. It sits above the A Series and below the luxury WM1 Series in the Walkman range.

== History ==
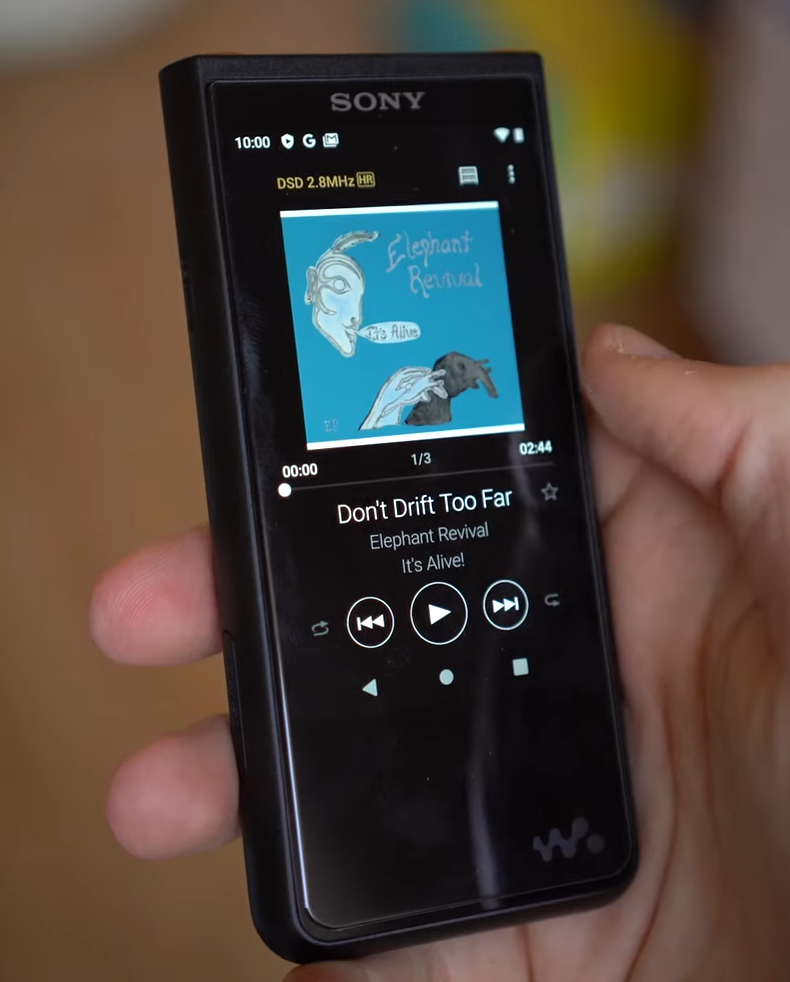
Sony NW-ZX507 playing music

The first model, NW-ZX1, featured a 4-inch display and a high quality digital amplifier that sold for about $900. It runs on Android. It was introduced on September 25, 2013, alongside the NW-F880 series and first released in Japan on December 7, followed by overseas markets in 2014.

A second-generation player, the NW-ZX2, was released in 2015.

Later in the same year, the NW-ZX100 was introduced. This player is cheaper than the ZX2, has a more compact and slimmer body, and runs on custom Sony software.

In 2017 the NW-ZX300 replaced the NW-ZX100. It is slimmer than the ZX100 and borrows design cues from the A Series of the same time. It also includes a 4.4 mm Pentaconn connector.

The NW-ZX500 series was introduced at IFA 2019, retailing for €830 / £750, with native DSD and MQA playback. It also had a USB-C port replacing the proprietary WM-PORT for data and power connection.

The NW-ZX700 series was introduced in January 2023. It has been released in select Asia-Pacific countries in January such as India, and will be released in Japan on February 23 for ¥104,500.

== Reception ==
What Hi-Fi? reviewed the NW-ZX1, praising the sound, design and buttons, while criticising its price and non-expandable memory. PC World Australia gave the player 3.5 stars out of 5, giving merit to sound quality and battery life, but noting that the buying price is steep.

In What Hi-Fi?'s early review of the NW-ZX507, its "detailed and dynamic sound" was praised, with no negatives given.

== Specification and comparison ==
Series	Image	Model	Capacity	Release date	Display	Rated battery life	Audio formats	OS	Wireless connectivity	Terminals	Physical size	Weight
NWZ-ZX1		NWZ-ZX1	128 GB	December 2013	4" (10.2 cm) 854 x 480 (FWVGA)	16 hours (Hi-Res Audio), 32 hours (MP3)	MP3, WMA, ATRAC (Japanese market), ATRAC Advanced Lossless (Japanese market), WAV, AAC, HE-AAC, FLAC, Apple Lossless, AIFF, DSD	Android 4.1	IEEE 802.11 a/b/g/n, Bluetooth 3.0	3.5 mm stereo jack, WM-PORT	122 mm 60 mm 13 mm	139 g (4.9 oz)
NW-ZX2		NW-ZX2	128 GB	February 2015	4" (10.2 cm) 854 x 480 (FWVGA)	33 hours (Hi-Res Audio), 60 hours (MP3)	MP3, WMA, ATRAC (Japanese market), ATRAC Advanced Lossless (Japanese market), WAV, AAC, HE-AAC, FLAC, Apple Lossless, AIFF, DSD	Android 4.2	IEEE 802.11 a/b/g/n, Bluetooth 3.0	3.5 mm stereo jack, WM-PORT, MicroSD	131 mm 65 mm 18 mm	235 g (8.29 oz)
NW-ZX100		NW-ZX100	128 GB	October 2015	3" (7.6 cm) 400x240 (WQVGA)	45 hours (Hi-Res Audio), 70 hours (MP3)	MP3, WMA, ATRAC (Japanese market), ATRAC Advanced Lossless (Japanese market), WAV, AAC, HE-AAC, FLAC, Apple Lossless, AIFF, DSD	Original	Bluetooth 3.0	3.5 mm stereo jack, WM-PORT, MicroSD	120 mm 54 mm 15 mm	145 g (5.11 oz)
NW-ZX100		NW-ZX100HN	128 GB	October 2015	3" (7.6 cm) 400x240 (WQVGA)	45 hours (Hi-Res Audio), 70 hours (MP3)	MP3, WMA, ATRAC (Japanese market), ATRAC Advanced Lossless (Japanese market), WAV, AAC, HE-AAC, FLAC, Apple Lossless, AIFF, DSD	Original	Bluetooth 3.0	3.5 mm stereo jack, WM-PORT, MicroSD	120 mm 54 mm 15 mm	145 g (5.11 oz)
NW-ZX300		NW-ZX300A	16 GB	October 2017	3.1" (7.8 cm) 800 x 480 (WVGA)	26 hours (Hi-Res Audio), 30 hours (MP3)	MP3, WMA, ATRAC (Japanese market), ATRAC Advanced Lossless (Japanese market), WAV, AAC, HE-AAC, FLAC, Apple Lossless, AIFF, DSD, APE, MQA	Original	Bluetooth 4.2	3.5 mm stereo jack, 4.4 mm balanced jack, WM-PORT, MicroSD	120.4 mm 57.7 mm 14.9 mm	157 g (5.54 oz)
NW-ZX300		NW-ZX300	64 GB	October 2017	3.1" (7.8 cm) 800 x 480 (WVGA)	26 hours (Hi-Res Audio), 30 hours (MP3)	MP3, WMA, ATRAC (Japanese market), ATRAC Advanced Lossless (Japanese market), WAV, AAC, HE-AAC, FLAC, Apple Lossless, AIFF, DSD, APE, MQA	Original	Bluetooth 4.2	3.5 mm stereo jack, 4.4 mm balanced jack, WM-PORT, MicroSD	120.4 mm 57.7 mm 14.9 mm	157 g (5.54 oz)
NW-ZX300		NW-ZX300G	128 GB	October 2017	3.1" (7.8 cm) 800 x 480 (WVGA)	26 hours (Hi-Res Audio), 30 hours (MP3)	MP3, WMA, ATRAC (Japanese market), ATRAC Advanced Lossless (Japanese market), WAV, AAC, HE-AAC, FLAC, Apple Lossless, AIFF, DSD, APE, MQA	Original	Bluetooth 4.2	3.5 mm stereo jack, 4.4 mm balanced jack, WM-PORT, MicroSD	120.4 mm 57.7 mm 14.9 mm	157 g (5.54 oz)
NW-ZX500		NW-ZX505	16 GB	November 2019	3.6" (9.1 cm) 1280 x 720 (HD)	16 hours (Hi-Res Audio), 20 hours (MP3)	MP3, WMA, WAV, AAC, HE-AAC, FLAC, Apple Lossless, AIFF, DSD, APE, MQA	Android 9	IEEE 802.11 a/b/g/n/ac, Bluetooth 5.0	3.5 mm stereo jack, 4.4 mm balanced jack, USB-C, MicroSD	122.6 mm 57.9 mm 14.8 mm	164 g (5.78 oz)
NW-ZX500		NW-ZX507	64 GB	November 2019	3.6" (9.1 cm) 1280 x 720 (HD)	16 hours (Hi-Res Audio), 20 hours (MP3)	MP3, WMA, WAV, AAC, HE-AAC, FLAC, Apple Lossless, AIFF, DSD, APE, MQA	Android 9	IEEE 802.11 a/b/g/n/ac, Bluetooth 5.0	3.5 mm stereo jack, 4.4 mm balanced jack, USB-C, MicroSD	122.6 mm 57.9 mm 14.8 mm	164 g (5.78 oz)
NW-ZX700		NW-ZX706	32 GB	January 2023	5" (12.7 cm) 1280 x 720 (HD)	21–25 hours		Initially released with Android 12, can be updated to Android 13 and Android 14	IEEE 802.11 a/b/g/n/ac, Bluetooth 5.0	3.5 mm stereo jack, 4.4 mm balanced jack, USB-C, MicroSD	132.3 mm 72.5 mm 16.9 mm	227 g (8.01 oz)
NW-ZX700		NW-ZX707	64 GB	January 2023	5" (12.7 cm) 1280 x 720 (HD)	21–25 hours		Initially released with Android 12, can be updated to Android 13 and Android 14	IEEE 802.11 a/b/g/n/ac, Bluetooth 5.0	3.5 mm stereo jack, 4.4 mm balanced jack, USB-C, MicroSD	132.3 mm 72.5 mm 16.9 mm	227 g (8.01 oz)

== See also ==
- List of Sony Walkman products
