= MagicGate =

Copy-protection technology by Sony

MagicGate logo

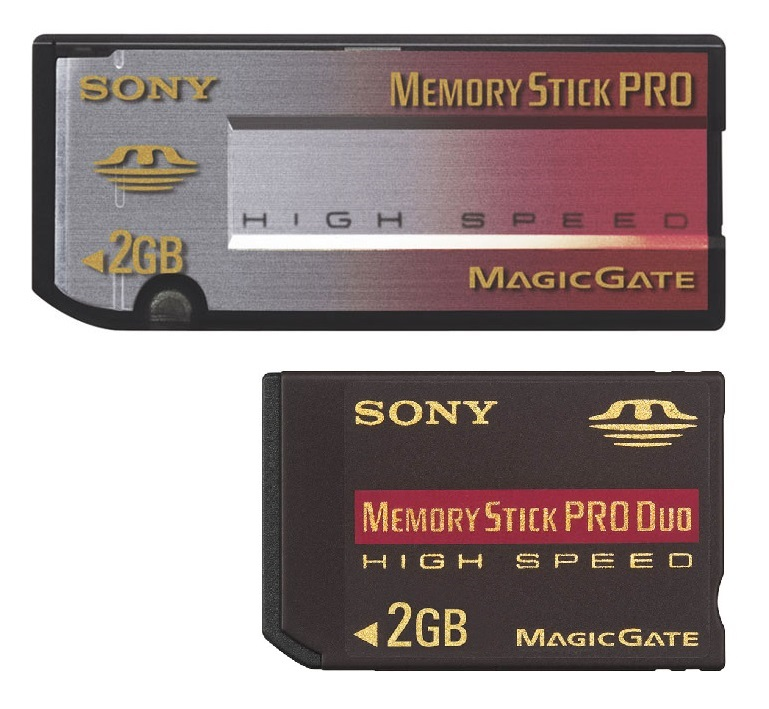
Memory Stick Pro and Memory Stick Pro Duo supporting MagicGate

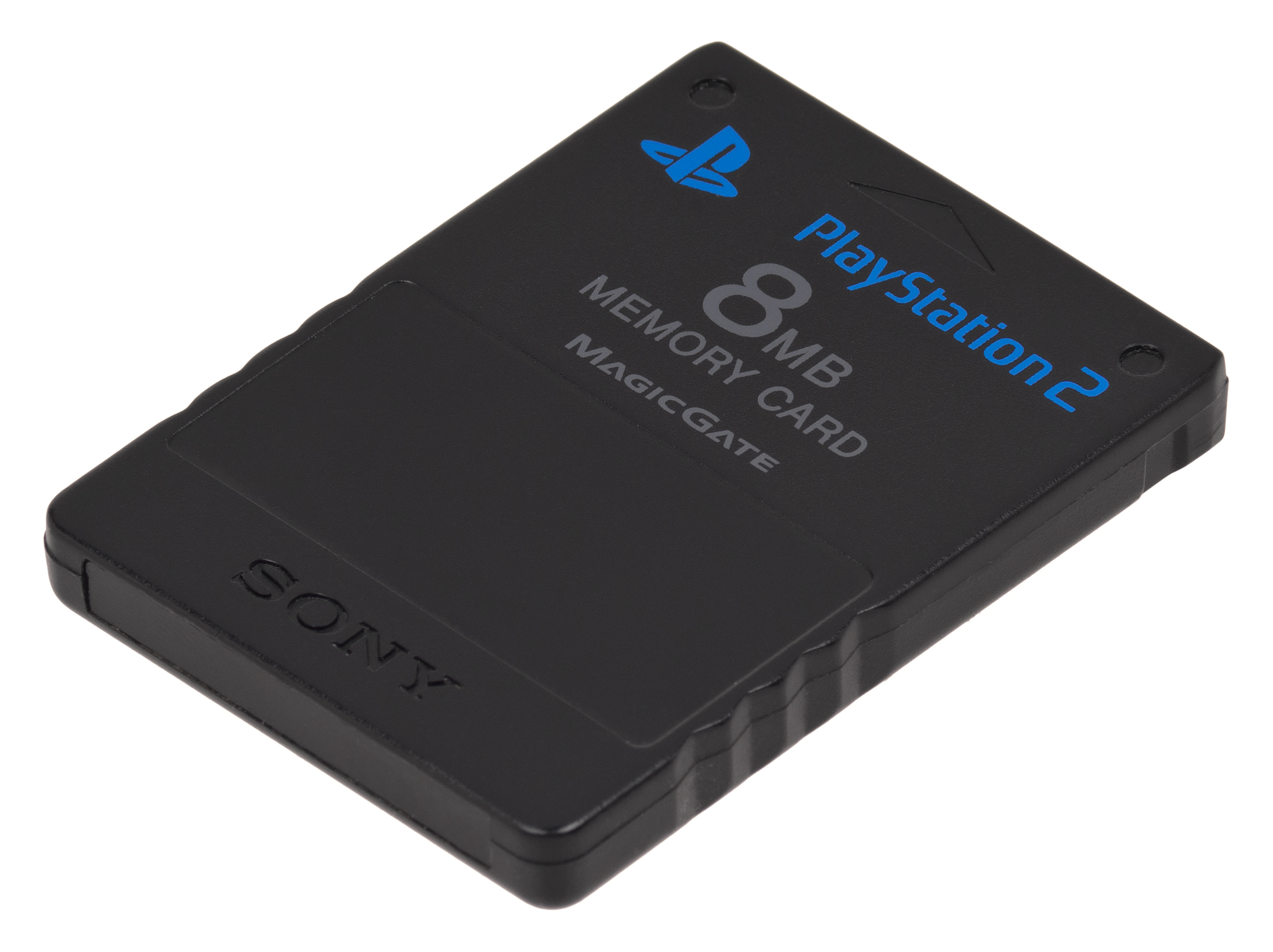
PlayStation 2 memory card supporting MagicGate

MagicGate (MG) was a copy-protection technology introduced by Sony in 1999 as part of the Secure Digital Music Initiative (SDMI). It worked by encrypting the content on the device and using MagicGate chips in both the storage device and the reader to enforce control over how files could be copied.

MagicGate encryption was introduced with Sony's first digital audio players, with the related OpenMG technology being its software counterpart. Since then, the encryption has been rolled out to other Sony devices – it is used in the memory cards of the PlayStation 2 and, by 2004, was introduced into all of Sony's Memory Stick products. Some devices only accepted Memory Sticks which supported MagicGate.

All Memory Stick Duo cards equipped with MagicGate can be identified by a notch located on the rear end of the card.

== Support ==
Few (USB or PC Card) Memory Stick-compatible memory card readers support secure MagicGate. Although manufacturers list Memory Stick Pro/Pro Duo (MG) compatibility, where MG means MagicGate, they may not support the security portion of MagicGate. This becomes important when purchasing a card reader/writer for use with SonicStage and Sony CONNECT as even Sony itself does not fully support MagicGate on certain readers. Non-MagicGate memory card reader/writers do not show up in SonicStage, with the notable exception of Sony Ericsson phones.

Sony devices which supported MagicGate included:

- Memory Stick capable Sony VAIO notebooks and desktops
- PlayStation 2
- PlayStation 3
- PlayStation Portable – The PlayStation Portable in service mode will only boot to Memory Sticks with MagicGate enabled
- PlayStation Vita – Used for verifying memory cards and PSP Emulation
- MSAC-US40 USB Memory Stick Card Reader/Writer

=== State of DRM ===
In March 2009, Sony Electronics announced they were phasing out the Sony CONNECT service in favor of Windows Media Audio & Windows Media DRM. MagicGate slots were still a part of the default Vaio configuration as of May 2010.

== See also ==
- Memory Stick
- OpenMG
- Memory Stick PRO
- SonicStage
- Handycam
- Cyber-shot
