= Mora (music store) =

Japanese online music and video store

mora
- Type: Private
- Industry: Digital music distribution
- Founded: 2006; 20 years ago
- Headquarters: Tokyo, Japan
- Area served: Japan
- Products: Digital music downloads
- Services: Online music store
- Parent: Sony Music Entertainment Japan
- Website: mora.jp

mora (モーラ, mōra) is an online music and video store for the Japanese market operated by Sony Music Solutions, a part of Sony Music Entertainment Japan (SMEJ). It is integrated into the Japanese version of Sony's Music Center for PC software, and was also integrated into its predecessors such as SonicStage. It is now the official store for their Walkman devices.

== History ==
When Sony released its NW-MS7 Memory Stick compatible digital Walkman player, Sony Music Entertainment Japan started offering digital music through a store called bitmusic in December 1999. Bitmusic was merged into mora in July 2007.

In 2000, Label Gate Co., Ltd. was formed, a joint venture of 17 Japanese record companies including Sony Music Entertainment Japan, Avex Group, and Universal Music Japan, which would then operate the bitmusic store.

The mora store was launched on April 1, 2004. At this time Label Gate was funded by 18 companies while 29 record labels were participant. Originally, music purchased from mora was exclusively in Sony's proprietary ATRAC3 format with OpenMG DRM. A partner store called mora win (モーラ ウィン, mōra win) was also in operation, using Windows Media Audio (WMA) codec and Windows Media DRM encryption, and integrated into the Japanese version of Microsoft's Windows Media Player 11 as the "recommended store" in Japan.

On October 1, 2012, mora underwent a rehaul into a DRM free store, selling songs and music videos in Advanced Audio Coding (AAC) formats. The mora win service was also eliminated in the restructuring, with the DRM free store being integrated into the Media Go service in Windows 8. One year later on October 17, 2013, mora began offering songs and albums as 24bit/96 kHz FLAC files.

Label Gate merged into Sony Music Solutions in 2021.

== See also ==
- Sony Connect
- LISMO
