= Music Center for PC =

Windows software

- Music Center for PC version 2.0
- Developer: Sony
- Release: August 29, 2017; 8 years ago
- Stable release: 2.7.3 / March 31, 2026; 3 months ago
- Operating system: Windows (10, 11)
- Predecessor: Media Go / x-APP
- Type: Music player
- License: Freeware
- Website: www.sony.com/electronics/support/articles/MC4PC020001

Music Center for PC is a music player and transfer software for Microsoft Windows, developed by Sony and first released in 2017.

== Overview ==
The software was created to replace Media Go and x-APPLICATION (Japanese: x-アプリ). Unlike those, Music Center for PC only focuses on audio and as a result it has had several features removed, such as CD burning, or non-audio media functionalities like photo or video playback and transfer. It is also not compatible for transfer with phones or consoles, but only with audio devices like Walkman, home stereos and theater systems, active speakers, and others.

Version 1.0 of Music Center for PC is based on x-APPLICATION (and in turn, SonicStage). Version 2.0 was released in late 2018 and had a major overhaul of the user interface developed on Electron. Additionally there is now also support for DSEE HX.

Gracenote tagging of music is also integrated into Music Center for PC. The mora music store is also integrated for Japanese customers to directly purchase music.

== Format support ==
Music Center for PC supports the playback of numerous formats including high-resolution audio, namely: ATRAC (.oma/.aa3), ATRAC Advanced Lossless (.oma/.aa3), WAV (.wav), MP3 (.mp3), AAC (.3gp/.mp4/.m4a), HE-AAC (.3gp/.mp4/.m4a), WMA (.wma), DSD (.dsf/.dff), FLAC (.flac), MQA (.mqa.flac), APE (.ape), ALAC (.mp4/.m4a) and AIFF (.aiff/.aif).

It can also play audio CDs, but ripping a CD is only possible into FLAC, WAV, MP3 or AAC formats.
