= Media Go =

Media player and library program for Windows

- Music playing function in Media Go
- Original authors: Sony Creative Software (2009–2010); Sony Network Entertainment International (2010–2016); Sony Interactive Entertainment (2016–2017)
- Release: March 17, 2009; 17 years ago
- Stable release: 3.2 (Build 191) / October 2016; 9 years ago
- Operating system: Windows XP SP3 (32-bit only); Windows Vista; Windows 7 Windows 8 Windows 8.1; Windows 10
- Available in: English, Polish, French, German, Spanish, Japanese, Italian, Korean, Chinese, Dutch, Portuguese, Swedish, Norwegian, Finnish, Danish, and Russian
- Type: Media player, photo management, podcast, and PlayStation Store manager
- License: Proprietary software, freeware
- Website: mediago.sony.com

Media Go is a media player and media library application software that runs on Microsoft Windows. It organizes and plays a wide variety of multimedia content including video, music, podcasts and photos, and can share them in a network as a DLNA server. Media Go also manages content on various Sony mobile devices including the PlayStation Portable, PlayStation Vita, Walkman, Sony Tablet, and Xperia. Gracenote tagging is integrated, and in the past it also had a storefront from PlayStation Network and mora for purchasing media content.

The software was offered by Sony Network Entertainment International, which later became Sony Interactive Entertainment. They announced the discontinuation of Media Go in December 2017; it was replaced by Music Center for PC which only works with audio products like Walkman. An archived version of Media Go can be found and downloaded from the Internet Archive for legacy use.

== History ==
Media Go was introduced in 2009 by Sony Creative Software, alongside the Sony Ericsson W995, initially made for transferring media to Sony Ericsson handsets excluding in the Japanese market. It was expanded to the PSP following the release of PSP Go, replacing the PSP Media Manager. From 2013 it replaced the X-App in Japan as the media manager for Sony devices.

== Features ==
Media Go has many features that can be used to manage and synchronise content. Advanced functionality allows music to be tagged with SensMe metadata, and support for track ratings and purchases that can be made from the PlayStation Store, Sony Xperia's PlayNow Arena or select partner stores (such as BigPond Music, for Telstra customers). Where applicable, Media Go will also automatically download and/or convert certain content (e.g. a podcast) into a suitable format. Media Go can also purchase, backup, and restore PlayStation Portable (PSP) and PlayStation Vita (PS Vita) games and other content, including digital comics; the ability to shop for and purchase PSP or PS Vita content from the PlayStation Store without a PSP or PS Vita connected to the host computer is now supported in current versions of Media Go. As of 2014, the PlayStation Store (except the Download List) is no longer available from Media Go, as it redirects to the PlayStation Store website. Game download and activation was completely disabled on October 24, 2016.

Like iTunes and Windows Media Player, Media Go is also able to "rip" music from a CD and automatically download missing metadata (album artwork in particular) via Gracenote. As of 2011, Media Go cannot "rip" video from a commercial DVD or BD. Media Go also provides "drag from" behaviour: most multimedia files that are displayed can be dragged from the Media Go application to a Windows Explorer folder, an e-mail message or browser drop target. Like most competing programs though, one of Media Go's primary functions is as a computer multimedia organizer and player/jukebox, with a choice of large or compact/mini interface modes; Media Go also acts as a fully functional picture manager, similar to Microsoft's Windows Media Player.

== File support ==
Media Go supports various audio file types including MP3, WAV, ALAC, FLAC, WMA, ATRAC, DSD, OGG and others. It also supports various video formats and image formats.

== See also ==
- SonicStage
- Sony Entertainment Network
- PlayStation Network
