= PSP Media Manager =

Commercial application for the PlayStation Portable

Media Manager for PSP is a discontinued commercial application from Sony Creative Software that managed content on the PlayStation Portable (PSP) for use on a computer. Media Manager is able to automatically convert and copy certain types of content (such as music & photos) to a PlayStation Portable, as well as download and copy video podcasts to the device. Music could be downloaded from the Sony Connect Internet-based music store, in countries where this service was offered, and from version 3.x onwards, the PlayStation Store was integrated directly into the software.

Media Manager for PSP was not typically included with the purchase of a PlayStation Portable and had to be purchased separately for a small fee, however from version 3.x onwards a basic version of the software was made available for free in most countries via their respective PlayStation website. Users of the "basic" version were able to purchase a "Pro" version for a small fee, that primarily offered the benefit of being able to convert and copy video files to a PlayStation Portable (this feature was unavailable in the "basic", free version from version 3.x onwards).

In the past, Sony Creative Software offered a range of "Media Manager" titles for different devices such as the PlayStation Portable, Sony Walkman range and compatible Sony Ericsson cell phones. In 2009, they combined the Media Manager applications into Media Go – an iTunes-like media management and digital music store desktop app, released for Windows. Media Go included PSP support, deprecating Media Manager for PSP. Media Go was discontinued in 2018.
