= Optical audio disc =

An audio optical disc is an optical disc that stores sound information such as music or speech. It may specifically refer to:

== Audio CDs ==
- Compact disc (CD), an optical disc used to store digital data (700 MB storage)
  - Compact Disc Digital Audio (CD-DA), a CD that contains PCM encoded digital audio in the original "Red Book" CD-DA format
  - 5.1 Music Disc, an extension to the Red Book standard that uses DTS Coherent Acoustics 5.1 surround sound
  - Compressed audio optical disc, an optical disc storing MP3s and other compressed audio files as data, rather than in the Red Book format

== Audio DVDs ==
- DVD, 4 GB single layer, 8 GB double layer storage
  - DVD-Audio, a DVD that plays audio
  - Super Audio CD (SACD), a format which competes with DVD-Audio

== Audio Blu-rays ==
- Blu-ray, 25 GB single layer, 50 GB double layer
  - BD-Audio, a Blu-ray disc that is capable of audio-only playback

== See also ==
- Compatible Discrete 4 (CD-4), a variety of quadrophonic audio for vinyl records
