= Toshiba W61T =

2008 Japanese mobile phone

W61T
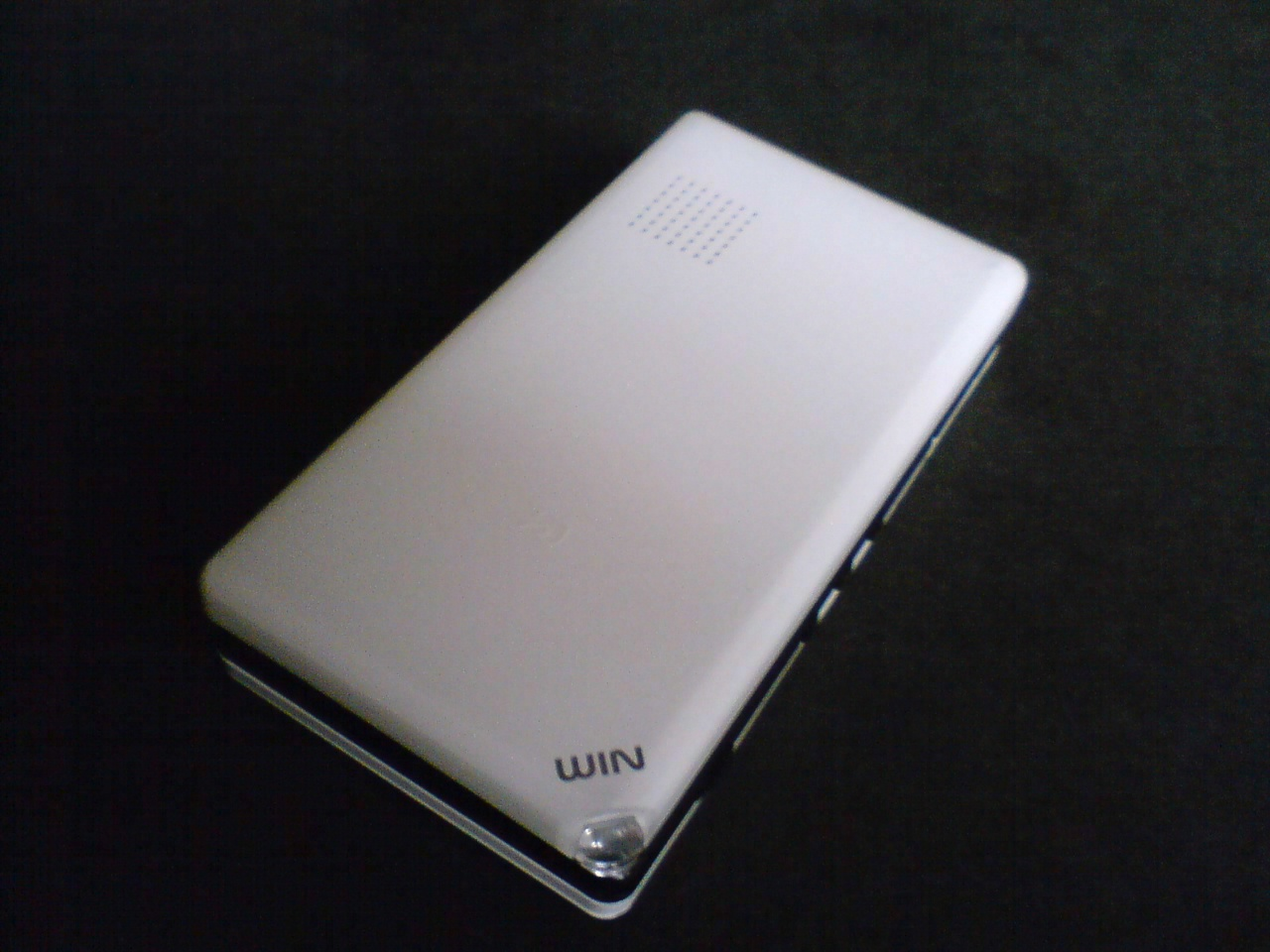
- W61T in Athletic White
- Brand: au
- Manufacturer: Toshiba
- Type: Feature phone
- First released: April 3, 2008
- Discontinued: March 31, 2022
- Predecessor: W56T
- Successor: T001
- Form factor: Clamshell
- Colors: Dancing Pink; Sailing Blue; Athletic White; Beautiful Pink; Healthy Green
- Dimensions: 98 mm (3.9 in) H 50 mm (2.0 in) W 18.9 mm (0.74 in) D
- Weight: 120 g (4.2 oz)
- Operating system: KCP+
- CPU: Qualcomm MSM7500 (600 MHz)
- Storage: 100 MB
- Removable storage: microSD
- Rear camera: 3.24 MP CMOS, Autofocus, Image stabilization
- Front camera: None
- Display: Primary: 2.8 in (71 mm) Wide QVGA (240×400 px) OLED, 260,000 colors Secondary: 7×7 Dot LED, single color

The W61T is a CDMA 1X WIN mobile phone developed by Toshiba and Toshiba Mobile Communications (now FCNT) for the Japanese market under the au brand by KDDI and Okinawa Cellular Telephone.

== History ==
On January 28, 2008, the device was announced by KDDI and Toshiba alongside "au Smart Sports" service for the mobile phone.

On April 3, 2008, pre-sales began in the Okinawa region.

On April 4, 2008, the device was released in the Hokkaido, Tohoku, and Shikoku regions.

On April 5, 2008, sales expanded to the Hokuriku, Kanto, Chubu, Kansai, Chugoku, and Kyushu regions.

On May 9, 2008, the first mobile software update was initiated. This update resolved issues where EZ "Chakuta-Full" audio device linking was unavailable, connection resets or unresponsiveness occurred while browsing via PC Site Viewer or EZweb, and device resets occurred during address book operation.

On June 14, 2008, new color options (Beautiful Pink and Healthy Green) were released nationwide.

On July 25, 2008, a software update addressed key unresponsiveness during EZweb use, connection or email failures, and resets when launching the camera.

In August 2008, sales of the device officially ended.

On August 29, 2008, a software update fixed an issue preventing site membership registration under specific conditions.

On October 24, 2008, an update resolved device freezes during dual-screen page refreshes and missing default values on select membership sites.

On September 17, 2009, an update fixed disconnection issues during large file uploads over SSL sites.

On July 22, 2012, service on the local 800 MHz band (JTACS) was terminated, restricting connectivity to the new 800 MHz and 2 GHz bands.

On March 31, 2022, all 3G services on the network were shut down, rendering the device fully unusable.

== Specifications ==
=== Hardware ===
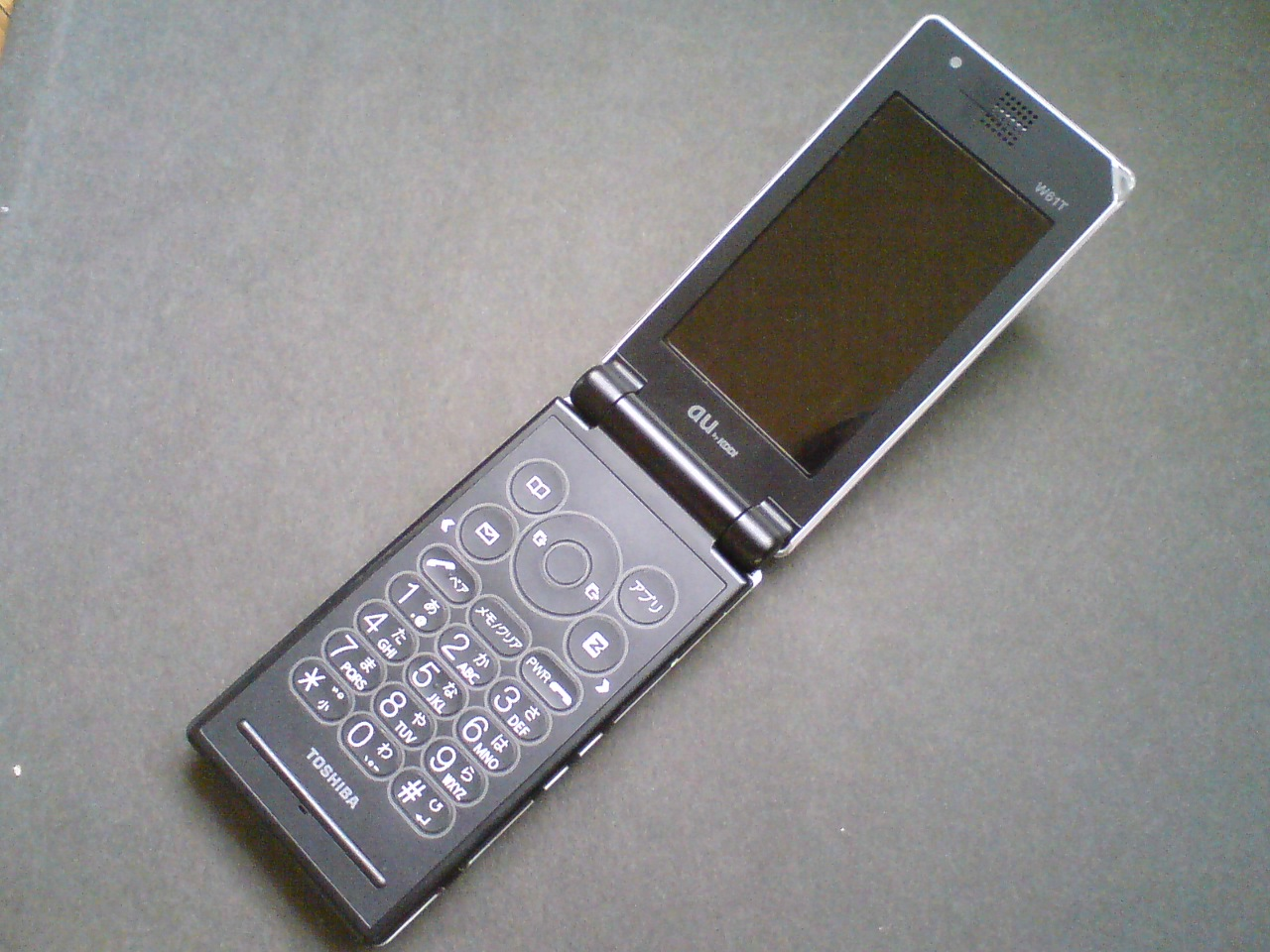
Front panel, open

The W61T was redesigned based on the W56T platform.

It is a clamshell terminal styled with a sporty, casual concept featuring a two-tone color arrangement inspired by a polo shirt collar.

Compared to its base model, the front-facing camera for video calls and digital radio capabilities were omitted, the internal storage was reduced from 800 MB to 100 MB, and the built-in speaker was changed from stereo to mono.

As a casual-tier handset, it omits the "Reversible Style" rotating display hinge and USB cradle charging communication features.

The FeliCa chip is housed behind the rear panel rather than inside the bottom panel.

1Seg TV playback requires connected earphone microphones or stereo earphone cables to act as an external antenna.

Its overall aesthetic sits midway between Toshiba's neon (W42T) and W55T models.

The device features a primary 2.8-inch Wide QVGA OLED main screen displaying 260,000 colors, along with a secondary 7×7 Dot LED sub-display.

The rear camera uses a 3.24-megapixel CMOS sensor equipped with autofocus and image stabilization, while no front camera is present.

Local connectivity options include irSimple infrared and Bluetooth support for audio playback via Toyota's G-BOOK mX/mX Pro telematics service.

It operates on CDMA 1X WIN (CDMA2000 1xEV-DO Rev.A) networks with a specific absorption rate (SAR) of 0.363 W/kg.

=== Software ===
The phone operates on the KCP+ operating system powered by a 600 MHz Qualcomm MSM7500 processor.

Supported software features include LISMO audio/video services, EZnavi Walk with 3D and voice input, Mobile Suica, and the net K2 high-fidelity audio processing engine jointly developed by Victor Company of Japan and Victor Entertainment.

It supports 1Seg TV and FM radio via au Media Tuner, along with BREW-based EZapps, Open App Player, and the PC Site Viewer web browser.

Despite being a Spring 2008 model, it does not support Emergency Earthquake Alerts.

== See also ==
- CDMA 1X WIN
- Toshiba
- KCP+
- W56T
- SonicStage
- T001
