= OpenMG =

Digital rights management system developed by Sony

OpenMG is a digital rights management (DRM) system developed by Sony for managing and protecting digital music data on a personal computer. It was originally designed for audio files in ATRAC3 format; the compliant software, e.g. Sony SonicStage, is usually capable of transcoding MP3 and WAV files to OpenMG/ATRAC3. The file extensions OpenMG-encrypted files use are .omg and .oma.

Sister technologies OpenMG Light (for mobile devices) and OpenMG X were also created.

== Development ==
OpenMG was created alongside MagicGate in an effort to protect digital music copyright. It was released alongside the Memory Stick Walkman and VAIO Music Clip. It is compliant with the Secure Digital Music Initiative (SDMI) version 1.0 industry group specification formed in February 1999.

There has been at least one reported case when a security update of Windows XP and Windows 2000 broke OpenMG-compliant software. This issue was later resolved.

== Method ==
Audio files encrypted using OpenMG cannot be played on another computer. OpenMG consists of a "check-in" and "check-out" system, whereby a music file can be transferred from a computer to up to three portable devices. It cannot be transferred to a fourth, unless at least one of the other three devices gets checked back in to the computer.

== Compatible software ==
- OpenMG Jukebox
- SonicStage
- MAGIQLIP2
- BeatJam
- Connect Player
- x-app
- VAIO Media

The compliant music organization systems work by "checking out" and "checking in" the files to/from portable players, keeping only one copy unlocked in order to hinder proliferation of copies.

SonicStage 3.4 includes an option to remove DRM from one's entire media library, allowing unrestricted use. However, this feature is disabled for copies without a license.

== Criticisms of OpenMG ==
The 'checking in' and 'checking out' of files can be cumbersome and risky in comparison with unprotected data. Side effects include user complaints of being locked out of their own original recordings, unable to transfer them to the computer. With some Sony portable audio players it is not possible to directly drag and drop the desired tracks to the device's visible directory. With the combination of OpenMG with MagicGate, Sony intends to restrict the files to be only moved instead of copied, artificially emulating the restrictions of physical objects. However, as of the most recent releases of Sonicstage, files can be "checked out" of the library an unlimited number of times to a portable device, without the need to "check in" any of them. There has been anecdotal evidence that OpenMG modules tend to "choke" reading corrupted MP3 ID3 tags.

A Wall Street Journal article that reviewed the Sony VAIO Music Clip player in 2000 noted that the OpenMG and MagicGate technologies "treats users like criminals".
