= Compressed audio optical disc =

Optical disc storing compressed audio files

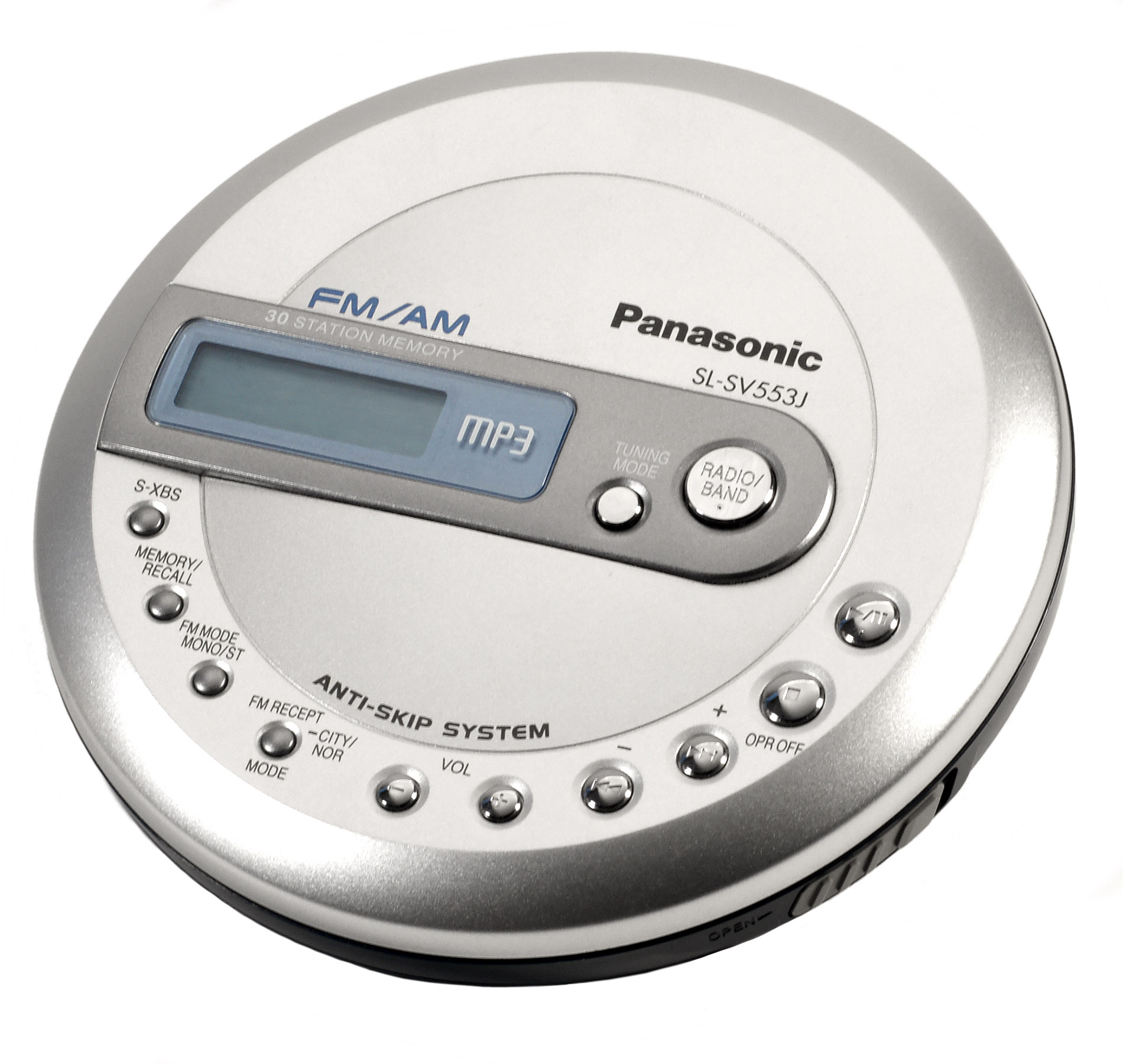
A CD player capable of playing MP3 CDs

A compressed audio optical disc, MP3 CD, or MP3 CD-ROM or MP3 DVD is an optical disc (usually a CD-R, CD-RW, DVD-R or DVD-RW) that contains digital audio in the form of lossy audio coding formats, most commonly the MP3 format. Discs are written in the Yellow Book standard data format (used for CD-ROMs) or the UDF format (used for DVD-ROMs), as opposed to the Red Book standard audio format (used for CD-DA audio CDs).

== Description ==
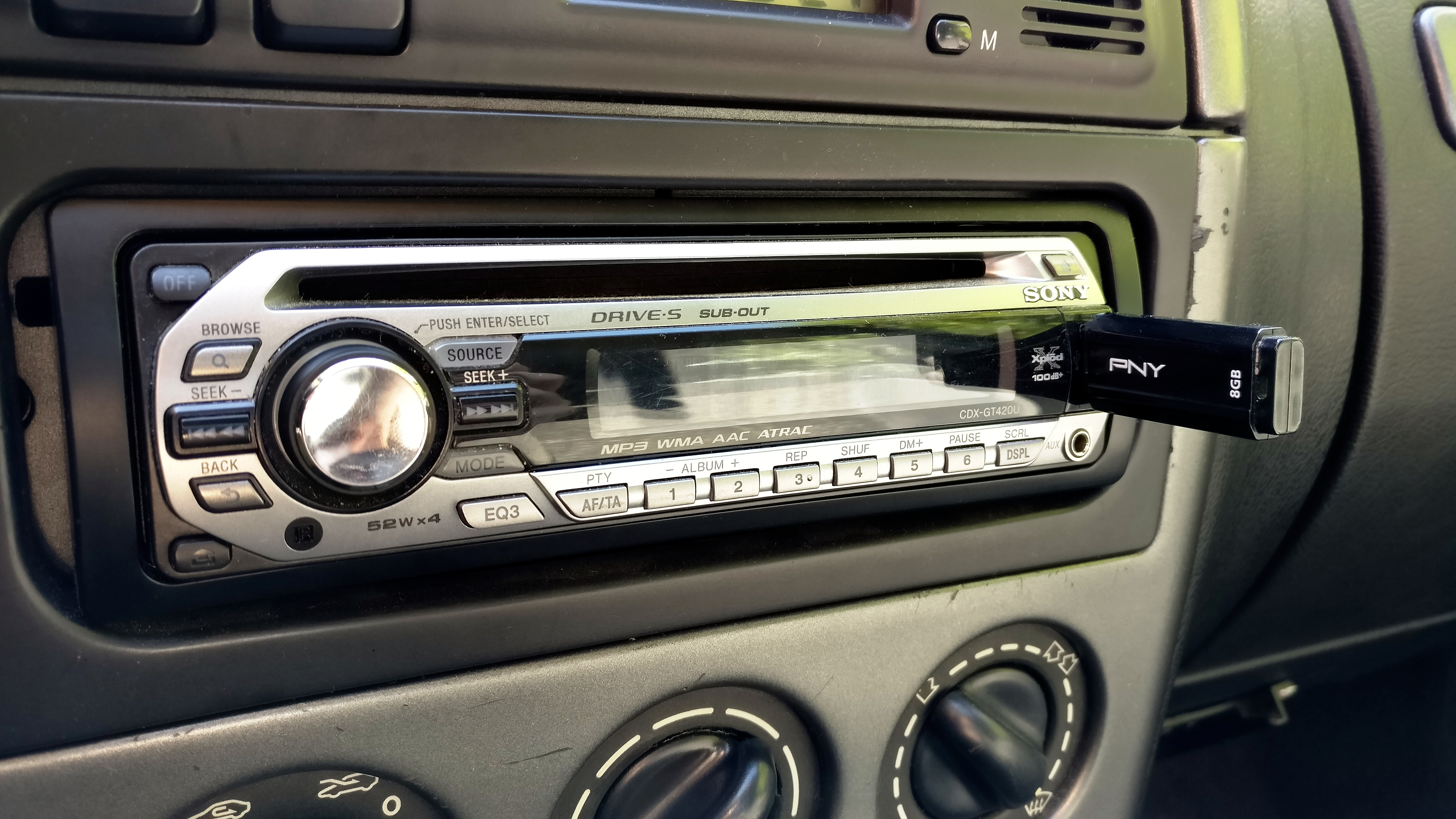
A Sony car stereo capable of playing a range of compressed audio formats from CD

Compressed audio files are supported by many modern CD players as well as DVD players. Disc players are capable of playing compressed formats, such as MP3, the most commonly used format, as well as Ogg Vorbis, AAC, the proprietary Windows Media Audio, and ATRAC.

Because of audio data compression, optical discs do not have to spin all of the time, potentially saving battery power; however, decompressing the audio takes more processor time. The audio is buffered in random-access memory, which also provides protection against skipping.

The number of files that a disc can hold depends on how the audio files are encoded and the length of the audio. A standard audio CD (74 minutes) can hold about 18 audio programs, a 650-MB data CD (equivalent to 74-minute audio CD) containing mid-quality (128-kb/s) audio files can hold 11 hours of audio or about 225 songs (assuming an average song is 3 minutes long).

ID3 tags stored in compressed audio files can be displayed by some players, and some players can search for audio files within directories on a compressed audio optical disc.

There is no official standard for how audio files on a compressed audio optical CD are stored on discs. As such, the format expected by different players varies. This sometimes leads to incompatibilities and difficulty in playing discs, often because of filename length limits, sub-directory limits, number-of-files limits, and special-character bugs. Sometimes, pressed CD containing MP3 can be used, since some CD-ROM video games can act as an "MP3 CD" for some users. Some older classic CD-ROM games tend to use WAV files since WAV files were the biggest audio format throughout the 1990s, and WAV files on optical discs are also compatible with CD players which have Yellow Book CD-ROM support.

== Use in audiobooks ==
This technology is most commonly used in audiobooks new on CD since 2000 or so, especially since unabridged audiobooks can run many hours in length. The Consumer Electronics Association and Audio Publishers Association have published the following standards on audiobooks.

- CEA-2003-C - Digital Audiobook File Format and Player Requirements
- CEA-2004, Audiobook Media and Player Compatibility.

== Advantages compared to Red Book audio CDs ==
- longer runtime as per file compression
  - 11 Red Book audio discs amount of audio, for the price of one Yellow Book (CD-ROM), depending on file compression rates (128-kb/s)
- Longer battery life from fewer disc spins
- Discs marketed without "music" endorsement aren't rejected since Yellow Book mode (CD-ROM) is being used instead of Red Book audio mode.

== Disadvantages compared to other means to play compressed digital audio ==
Most disadvantages with compressed audio optical discs are present with CD, and DVD in general.

=== Re-write (RW) limits and compatibility compared to write-once (R) ===
Compared to solid-state flash memory which can be rewritten a finite amount of about 100,000 times and hard drives which can be rewritten a near-infinite number of times, optical discs with compressed audio on them are either non-rewritable (CD-R/DVD-R), or can only be rewritten a relatively small number of times which may optionally include having to erase the entire volume before re-writing (CD-RW/DVD-RW). 100,000+ write/erase cycles on flash memory (while retaining old data) can be somewhat of a moot point with applications that have less demand for usage.

Another issue re-writable optical discs suffer from, is that the re-writable discs have less compatibility with older disc players, though most CD and DVD players that support MP3, AAC or other compressed audio will support RW discs easily.

=== Longevity of service life ===
The dependency of moving parts for the associated equipment guarantees less runtime than solid-state portable media players for battery life reasons, as well as the overall service life. When being looped, an optical disc player can fail in less than one month when spinning uninterrupted, and solid-state portable media players can run for as long as 6 months uninterrupted without failure.

=== Shelf space ===
Yellow Book optical disc ROMs with compressed audio may free up as many as 11 Red Book audio CDs (1441kbps/128kbps=11discs), but they still demand much shelf space, compared to external hard drives and solid-state flash memory.

=== Material degradation ===
Unlike mechanical discs with permanent housing such as hard drives, and solid-state devices like flash memory which generally has inexpensive but tough housing, optical discs typically have a reflective surface that can get damaged at relatively low thresholds of surface damage, in which if damage is just accidental, it could mean rendering it unusable. Also, the repeated handling of discs between jewel case and disc drive exposes the disc to dust, and also makes the disc liable to be damaged permanently.

Also note that some CD and DVD discs also have defective aluminum layers that can flake, and damage the disc naturally.

If an archival-grade disc is used, such as gold CD or M-DISC, the disc may last far longer than hard drives or flash memory, according to the claims of their manufacturer.

=== File/volume size limits and access to files ===
Repeated insertion and removal of optical discs may be required in the case of multi-gigabyte collections. Copying the files to a hard drive is one possible workaround to gain faster access to files.

Recordable Blu-ray Discs can solve this problem to an extent, but have other disadvantages such as the higher cost of recordable Blu-ray discs, higher cost of stand-alone Blu-ray burners and equipment with BD-ROM drives (compared to DVD or CD discs and burners). Another option is hard drives and solid-state flash memory, which is re-writable.

== See also ==
- Red Book: Compact Disc Digital Audio (CD-DA)
- Yellow Book: Compact Disc Read-Only Memory (CD-ROM)
- ATRAC CD
