= Sony Connect =

Series of software products by Sony

CONNECT Music Store

- Screenshot of Sony Connect Store (United Kingdom) in 2006
- Developer: Sony Corporation
- Launched: June 4, 2004; 22 years ago
- Discontinued: March 31, 2008
- Platforms: Microsoft Windows, web browser
- Website: musicstore.connect.com

Sony Connect, stylised Sony CONNECT, was the name for a series of related software products by Sony, most notably the Connect Music Store online music store. Sony CONNECT Inc. was a subsidiary of Sony Corporation of America.

Sony Connect was Sony's second attempt at online music following PressPlay.

== Connect Music Store ==
The CONNECT Music Store was Sony's music store built within the SonicStage music management application for Microsoft Windows-based personal computers. It was one of the world's largest online music download stores with over 2.5 million tracks to preview and purchase, with over 10,000 new songs added every Tuesday.

In 2003, Robert Shahnazarian began producing exclusive recording only available to users of Sony Connect. These sessions were the brain child of Ty Braswell and Neil Schield to provide exclusive content to users of Sony Connect's music platform. These session were recorded at Sony Studios in Santa Monica along with Westlake Recording Studios. These “exclusive” sessions were known as the Live from the Connect living-room series, and were recorded and mixed by Robert Shahnazarian. Over 350 sessions were recorded for this series and included such artists as Taylor Swift, John Legend, David Crosby & Graham Nash, Tears for Fears, and Brand Carlile to name just a few.

The CONNECT Music Store closed in North America and Europe on 31 March 2008, and the website has been unavailable from 1 March 2008. However, in late 2008, Sony launched a new online music store called "bandit.fm" on a trial basis in several countries, particularly Australia and New Zealand. The store was never launched globally, and closed in 2016. In 2010, Sony also launched another store named Music Unlimited which at first was compatible with PlayStation devices.

"Sony Connect" was also the name given to the software used to manage book, music and image content on the Sony Reader; it has since been renamed Sony eBook Library.

The SonicStage software transferred music tracks to Sony media devices like Network Walkman, CD Walkman, Hi-MD, PSP (via the Memory Stick), Clie handheld or Vaio computers, but did not transfer to non-Sony hardware.

== Connect Video ==
Sony CONNECT Video was a division within Sony CONNECT developing digital service platforms to enable distribution of next-generation entertainment to Sony devices.

Users could download video content directly to their device wirelessly or by means of using the USB port and their computer.

== Connect Player ==
Screenshot of CONNECT Player

CONNECT Player was a media player application, developed by Sony Connect, a division of Sony Corporation of America in 2005. It was released for European and Japanese market in November 2005 to be used with Sony's new HDD digital music players - the NW-A Series Walkman (A1000 and A3000).

In January 2006, Sony Europe recommended users to change to SonicStage (Sony's earlier media player) pending potential further updates to the CONNECT Player software due to thousands of reports regarding its many problems. In May 2006, Connect Player was absorbed into a newly released SonicStage version called SonicStage CP (the letters bearing the name).

== Compatibility ==
The CONNECT Music Store was only accessible via Internet Explorer on computers running the Microsoft Windows operating system.

Files downloaded from the CONNECT Music Store were encrypted using Sony's digital rights management, in the OpenMG (*.omg & *.oma) file format. Audio content is encrypted using an OpenMG compliant program — SonicStage — and stored on a computer's hard disk for playback or transfer to a Sony media device. The file format is ATRAC3, Sony's proprietary compressed music format.
