= SonicStage =

Sony music management software (2001–09)

- Developer: Sony
- Final release: 5.2 (Japan) / 4.3 (international) / June 11, 2009; 16 years ago / August 8, 2007; 18 years ago
- Operating system: Windows
- Predecessor: OpenMG Jukebox
- Successor: x-APPLICATION
- Type: Music player
- License: Freeware
- Website: None (product unavailable)

SonicStage is a discontinued software product from Sony that is used for managing portable devices when they are plugged into a computer running Microsoft Windows. It comprises a music player and library manager, similar to iTunes, Windows Media Player and RealPlayer. It is used to manage the library of ATRAC (.omg and .oma) and MP3 recordings on a PC.

SonicStage was a requirement to transfer and manage music on all Network Walkman, NetMD and Hi-MD players, and the Clie handheld, before the product was dropped entirely outside of Japan in 2007.

== History ==
SonicStage was first used in Vaio PCs put on the Japanese market in October 2001, and superseded OpenMG Jukebox. Version 2 was found on 2004 model products, and Version 3 on 2005 model products (Sony introduced native MP3 support on its music players in 2005).

The Sony Connect service was used to purchase recordings online, and could be accessed from within the SonicStage program. However, Sony announced that on 31 March 2008, its CONNECT download site would be going offline, affecting SonicStage users. In late 2008, Sony launched a new online music store called "bandit.fm" on a trial basis for a small number of markets. It was expected that Sony would launch bandit.fm globally, however Sony never did this and closed the store in 2016. Japan exclusively uses the mora service, and SonicStage continued to be released for Japanese customers until it was superseded by x-APPLICATION in 2013.

== Features ==
=== Copying and usage restriction ===
SonicStage is closely tied to a requirement that the program guard against copyright infractions. Sony music players have a write-only design. Somewhat similar to an Apple iPod, it is not generally possible to move tracks from the music player to the PC hard drive, and thereby from one music player to another. Some earlier models (such as some of the Net-MD line) could not even transfer voice recordings made by the user (with the player's microphone input) to their PC.

Copy restriction is provided by a group of design features and software limitations. The main features being:

1. The software strictly enforces digital rights management through its use of OpenMG. SonicStage ties the DRM license of each track to the hardware of the computer from which it has been transferred. SonicStage will not allow transfer of tracks from the player to another computer. It is possible, however, to backup "My Library" and import it into another installation of SonicStage on a different computer.
2. Music files have to be "wrapped" by Sony software in order to be played on a Sony music player. Sony has not introduced drag and drop support for music files. Although it is possible to load files directly onto a Sony player without using SonicStage, it is not possible to play music files loaded this way. Neither is it possible in most cases to transfer music files back to a PC. (all versions prior to 3.4)
3. The program does not generally convert OMG/OMA files to MP3 or WAV.
4. The program only supports OMG format, not MP3. The program converts any audio files imported into it into OMG format, including audio files that are not legally downloaded, or illegally copied music.
5. The program lacks a true import album feature for WAV and MP3 files. The program imports tracks as is. MP3 and WAV files cannot generally be used. Imported files cannot be grouped into an album with artist, title and track number fields assigned at the time of import. This has to be done before or after import.
6. When WAV tracks are imported, they remain linked to their WAV source file and the track can only be edited for as long as that file remains on the computer. This makes it difficult to use SonicStage to edit CDs that have been ripped with another program.

In version 3.4, an intermediate update mostly for Hi-MD users, some of the above restrictions are relaxed. SonicStage 3.4 allows tracks recorded via digital or analogue inputs on Hi-MD devices to be transferred back in WAV format. Also, files in Sony's proprietary ATRAC format can now be converted to WAV.

=== MP3 support ===
Support for MP3 files in both SonicStage and 2005 model devices is unreliable. A 2005 model device may be unable to play low bit rate MP3 tracks.

SonicStage will play ATRAC3 files directly from a digital music device when the latter is connected to the computer and detected by the software. SonicStage 3 does not play DRM-wrapped MP3 files directly from the device.

== Versions ==
=== OpenMG Jukebox ===
The origins of SonicStage lie in OpenMG Jukebox, which was created for the Memory Stick Walkman (NW-MS7) and VAIO Music Clip, Sony's first digital audio players. It can transfer files in the newly developed ATRAC3 format to these players, or convert existing MP3 files to ATRAC3.

=== Version 1 ===
Version 1.5 adds native support for ATRAC3plus and Windows Media Audio (WMA). An MP3 encoding plug-in was sold on Sony's on-line stores (SonyStyle Japan: ¥1,590), for their Palm device called CLIÉ. This encoding function for WMA/MP3 was removed in SonicStage Version 2.0, which supports only the decoding function.

=== Version 2 ===
This is the last version of SonicStage before native MP3 devices were introduced by Sony. MP3 is supported by converting the mp3 file to ATRAC format and downloading that file to the device.

The v2 library manager is "benign" in that it sits on top of what is already on the hard drive, and doesn't change what is already there (it will change a filename if the user has configured it as such.) Users can tell it an album exists in a directory, and import that group of files as an album without having the program change the header information in the tracks.

From version 2.1 onwards, all newly created and managed tracks use the newer OpenMG Audio (.oma) format in place of the previous OpenMG (.omg) format. SonicStage added a batch conversion tool to convert older .omg files into .oma.

=== Version 3 ===
Version 3 uses the header information in the tracks to get album, artist and track name information. The tracks are placed in the database according to what is in the tracks. When the header fields in a track are blank, the program imports the track into the unnamed album (no name, no artist, no album). As a consequence, when importing tracks, many albums are placed into the album called "Unnamed".

Tracks under digital rights management cannot be changed, and neither can tracks with a missing source link.

As noted above, Version 3 lacks an "import album" feature. SonicStage v3 classifies tracks according to the album-related information present in their headers.

2 GB memory sticks are not supported.

Sony added the option to drop DRM on ripped files in SonicStage v3.3.

SonicStage 3.4 includes an option to de-DRM an entire library (the larger it is, the longer it takes) allowing unlimited transfer and playback on PCs. Users can share non-DRM files with other people. The option to de-DRM files does not work on unplayable OMA files.

SonicStage 3.4 can operate on Windows Vista after some manual driver installations.

=== Version 4 (SonicStage CP) ===
Adds the ability to import AAC-LC, as well as HE-AAC.

The main downside is that a number of features, such as the ability to recover from corrupt track lists, are still missing. Restrictions on what non-administrator users could do were due to restrictions imposed by Windows XP and earlier; these restrictions are not present with Windows Vista and later.

Version 4.3 (called SonicStage CP, for Connect Player) adds Windows Vista compatibility (Vista 64-bit and Windows 7 64-bit are not officially supported but Sonicstage will run, although Sony did not provide 64-bit drivers for the hardware, they are available from third party sources). As of October 2008, this is the latest version of the English (and other non-Japanese language) SonicStage. From March 29, 2013 onwards this version is no longer available for download from the Sony website.

Version 4.4, released on January 10, 2008 (only in Japan), added HE-AAC transfer function for new Walkmans.

=== Version 5 (SonicStage V) ===
SonicStage V is the final version of the Japanese SonicStage, and features a new user interface like SonicStage for LISMO. Version 5.0 released on October 9, 2008 in Japan. On 9 Feb 2009, version 5.1 was released.

SonicStage V does not work with the Hi-MD/Net MD Walkmans, MP3-CD/ATRAC-CD players (such as CD Walkmans) and other old devices.

== Successors ==
At IFA 2007, Sony announced that SonicStage software would be dropped for all future Walkman products. Music management is instead done using drag and drop, the Media Manager of PlayStation Portable, or Windows Media Player 11. In 2008, Sony created a lightweight Windows and Mac software called Content Transfer that provides drag and drop transfer from Windows Media Player and iTunes.

== SonicStage for LISMO ==
SonicStage for LISMO is a stripped-down version of Japanese SonicStage CP, and is a part of the "LISMO Port" suite. Version 1.0 was released on February 1, 2008. SonicStage for LISMO developed for a new ATRAC service (LISMOオーディオ機器連携) of LISMO, the online music store provided by a Japanese mobile phone operator KDDI (au). There are some useful benefits to using LISMO, but little of value for non-LISMO users. The playable codecs are same as SonicStage Version 4.x, but encoding functions are only available for the ATRAC codecs.

As of October 2008, 16 "au" phones (manufactured by Casio Hitachi Mobile Communications, Kyocera, Sanyo, Sharp, Sony Ericsson and Toshiba) support LISMO's ATRAC service.

== SonicStage Mastering Studio ==
SonicStage Mastering Studio is a related Windows software package. It is a music editing tool and initially allowed users to turn analog sound sources into high-quality digital sound sources. It was first released in 2003 and was followed by version 2.0 in 2005.

== Criticism ==
SonicStage was criticized for being user unfriendly and having numerous technical defects. It is only possible to move tracks from the music player to the PC's hard drive, and thereby from one music player to another, if each device/computer is "authorized" to the user's account with the Connect Store for their country. Users from countries that did not have the Connect Store service were limited to one device/computer.

In late 2005, Sony released the Connect Player software for use with their Walkman NW-A series released at the time. That too proved to be problematic to users, forcing Sony to apologize in January 2006 and temporarily take the software off the market.

== Alternatives ==
=== MP3 File Manager ===
Sony offers the MP3 File Manager for Network Walkmans as a very limited alternative to SonicStage. It only provides a simple drag-and-drop interface and is lacking many of the newer, more advanced features of SonicStage (such as the ability to transfer files back to the computer).

The application is intended to be installed on the Network Walkman itself. Although it can be run directly on the device, it is not truly a portable application because it requires that the driver be installed on the computer.

The most recent version (2.0) can be downloaded from here or here. There is also an older version (1.2) for older Network Walkmans available here.

=== VAIO Music Transfer ===
As mentioned in this forum, the VAIO Music Transfer software allows files to be dragged and dropped onto the player. It may still require SonicStage to be installed. It works with the NW-A700-series and NW-E00XF-series players as well as the NW-HD1 and NW-HD3.

=== MP3 Conversion Tool ===
Sony released an MP3 Conversion Tool in 2007, which can be used to convert non-DRM protected ATRAC® format audio files stored on computers to MP3 format audio files. To run the MP3 Conversion Tool, the OpenMG Secure Module is required (included with SonicStage). The tool can be downloaded from Sony's eSupport page.

=== Third-party alternatives ===
- voidMP3FM file manager is free, and supports some features that the official MP3FM does not (e.g. ability to transfer files back to the computer). voidMP3FM works with NW-E002, NW-E003, NW-E005, NW-A608, and (unofficially) NW-E015F, allows transfer of tracks back to HD, and the compatibility is improved in each version (last release was 6 October 2006). It also works under WINE in Linux.
- JSymphonic is a piece of open-source Java software that works on Linux, Microsoft Windows and Mac OS X and can transfer MP3s to and from the Sony NW-E00x series and HDD NW-A series players. It is a continuation of the NW-E00x Mp3 File Manager project.
- Grab Your Music (GYM) software allows transfer (upload) of audio files back to the computer from the Walkman.
- ML Sony is a plugin for the multimedia player Winamp. It integrates with Winamp's library and allows the user to transfer MP3s between the PC and the Sony Walkman. It does not require SonicStage to be installed.
- linux-minidisc is a project to develop free transfer software for all HiMD- and NetMD-Walkman devices. The software features a library libhimd for accessing HiMD-devices and a Qt-based GUI (QHiMDTransfer); these both can be ported to many platforms, including Linux, Windows and Macintosh computers. Currently, upload (i.e. transfer from the Walkman to the PC) of MP3s and PCM/ATRAC3/ATRAC3+-recordings (all HiMD Walkman) is possible, more functionality (downloads to the device, deleting, renaming tracks etc.) is being worked on. NetMD is supported as well (through a collection of Python scripts) in the form of downloads (all NetMD) and uploads (MZ-RH1 only). The sophisticated debugging and reverse-engineering protection of OpenMG/AVLib made development tedious but linux-minidisc is the only software to provide this functionality to date. As of 2022, the most recent release was in January 2019.
- Web MiniDisc is a utility created by Stefano Brilli that uses portions of the linux-minidisc project under Chrome web browsers. Unlike SonicStage, this utility can be used under 64-bit operating systems.
