= PlayStation Portable =

Handheld video game console by Sony

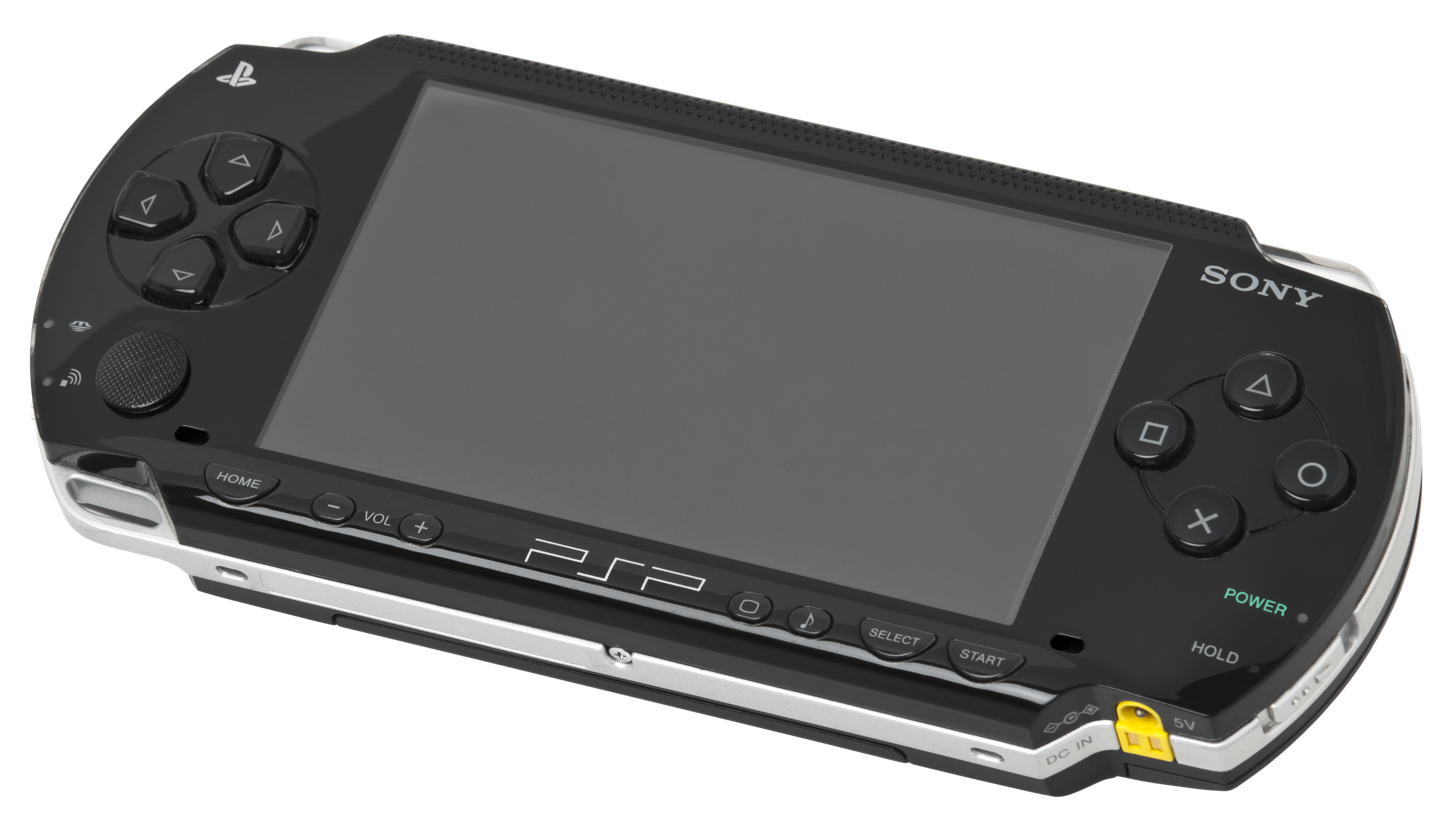
- Original model (PSP-1000)
- Also known as: PSP
- Developer: Sony Computer Entertainment
- Manufacturer: Sony Electronics
- Product family: PlayStation
- Type: Handheld game console
- Generation: Seventh
- Released: December 12, 2004: JP: December 12, 2004; NA: March 24, 2005; EU]/AU: September 1, 2005; IDN: October 1, 2009
- Lifespan: 2004–2014
- Introductory price: US$249.99 (equivalent to $410 in 2025)
- Discontinued: NA: January 2014; JP: June 2014; PAL: Holiday 2014
- Units sold: 80 million
- Media: UMD (except PSP Go), digital distribution
- Operating system: PlayStation Portable system software
- CPU: 333 MHz MIPS32 R4000-based
- Memory: 32 MB (PSP-1000); 64 MB (2000, 3000, PSP Go, E1000) (system RAM); 2 MB (video RAM)
- Storage: Memory Stick Duo, Memory Stick PRO Duo (Except PSP Go); Memory Stick Micro (M2) and 16 GB flash memory (PSP Go)
- Display: 480 × 272 pixels with 24-bit color, 30:17 widescreen TFT LCD; 4.3 in (110 mm) (1000, 2000, 3000, E1000); 3.8 in (97 mm) (PSP Go)
- Graphics: Custom Rendering Engine + Surface Engine GPU, 2.6 GFLOPS
- Sound: Stereo speakers (Except E1000), mono speaker (E1000), 3.5 mm headphone jack, Bluetooth Audio (PSP Go)
- Input: Analog stick; 14 × digital buttons (L, R, Select, Start, Home/PS, Display (except PSP Street), Sound (except PSP Street), Volume +/−, Power/Hold); Digital D-pad; Microphone (3000, PSP Go)
- Connectivity: Wi-Fi (802.11b) (except E1000), IrDA (1000), USB, Bluetooth (PSP Go)
- Online services: PlayStation Network
- Dimensions: PSP-1000: 2.9 in (74 mm) (h); 6.7 in (170 mm) (w); 0.91 in (23 mm) (d); PSP-2000/3000: 2.8 in (71 mm) (h); 6.7 in (169 mm) (w); 0.75 in (19 mm) (d); PSP Go (PSP-N1000): 2.7 in (69 mm) (h); 5.0 in (128 mm) (w); 0.65 in (16.5 mm) (d); PSP Street (PSP-E1000): 2.9 in (73 mm) (h); 6.8 in (172 mm) (w); 0.85 in (21.5 mm) (d)
- Weight: PSP-1000: 9.9 ounces (280 g); PSP-2000/3000: 6.7 ounces (189 g); PSP Go (PSP-N1000): 5.6 ounces (158 g); PSP Street (PSP-E1000): 7.9 ounces (223 g)
- Best-selling game: Grand Theft Auto: Liberty City Stories (7.5 million) (list)
- Predecessor: PocketStation
- Successor: PlayStation Vita

The PlayStation Portable (Note: Japanese: Pureisutēshon Pōtaburu (プレイステーション・ポータブル)) (PSP) is a handheld game console developed and marketed by Sony Computer Entertainment. It was first released in Japan on December 12, 2004, in North America on March 24, 2005, and in PAL regions on September 1, 2005. It is the first handheld installment in the PlayStation line of consoles. As a seventh generation console, the PSP primarily competed with the Nintendo DS.

Development of the PSP was announced during E3 2003, and the console was unveiled at a Sony press conference on May 11, 2004. The system was the most powerful portable video game console at the time of its introduction, and was the first viable competitor to Nintendo's handheld consoles after challengers such as Nokia's N-Gage and Sega's Game Gear had failed or underperformed. The PSP's advanced graphics capabilities made it a popular mobile entertainment device, which could connect to the PlayStation 3, any computer with a USB interface, other PSP systems, and the Internet. The PSP also functioned as a portable media player, with features such as audio and video playback off of internal storage. The PSP is the only handheld video game console to use an optical disc format, the Universal Media Disc, as its primary storage medium, and the format was used to distribute both games and media content.

The PSP was received positively by critics. The system sold over 80 million units during its ten-year lifetime, making it the best selling handheld video game console of all time not made by Nintendo. Several models of the console were released, including the PSP Street and the PSP Go. The system would go on to be succeeded by the PlayStation Vita, released in Japan in December 2011, which would have backward compatibility with PSP games that were released on the PlayStation Network through the PlayStation Store. Hardware shipments of the PSP ended worldwide in 2014.

== History ==
=== Pre-release ===
Prior to 2004, Sony was a leading company in the development and production of portable media players, producing product lines such as the Walkman for audio playback and the Watchman for live television. However, the handheld video game market would be largely dominated by Nintendo beginning with the Game Boy in 1989, with it and its successors outselling competition such as Sega's Game Gear and Bandai's WonderSwan line by significant margins. With the exception of the PocketStation in 1999, a PlayStation Memory Card capable of playing rudimentary games installed onto it, Sony would not make any public attempts to enter into this market until into the sixth generation of video game consoles.

Sony Computer Entertainment first announced development of the PlayStation Portable at a press conference preceding E3 2003. Sony released extensive technical details and introduced the Universal Media Disc to be used for games, but did not show any hardware aside from that. Then-CEO Ken Kutaragi would dub the PSP the "Walkman of the 21st century", in reference to the console's multimedia capabilities. Initial reception was positive, with outlets such as IGN and Eurogamer impressed with the handheld's computing capabilities and looking forward to its potential as a gaming platform. An IDC analyst argued the PSP was the "first legitimate competitor to Nintendo's dominance in the handheld market".

The first concept images of the PSP appeared at a Sony corporate strategy meeting in November 2003, and featured a model with flat buttons and no analog stick. Some reviewers initially expressed concern about the lack of an analog stick, but by E3 2004, the final PSP design would be unveiled with a stick below the D-Pad. Sony released a list of 99 developer companies that pledged support for the new handheld, and demos for games such as Konami's Metal Gear Acid and Studio Liverpool's Wipeout Pure were shown at the conference.

=== Launch and early success ===
On October 18, 2004, Sony announced that the PSP base model would be launched in Japan on December 11 that year for ¥19,800 (about $181 USD in 2004) while the Value System would launch for ¥24,800 (about $226 USD). The launch was a success, with over 200,000 units sold on the first day of sales. On February 3, 2005, Sony announced that the PSP would be released in North America on March 24 in one configuration for an MSRP of $249 USD/$299 CAD. Some commentators expressed concern over the high price, which was almost $20 USD higher than that of the Japanese model and over $100 higher than the Nintendo DS. Despite these concerns, the PSP's North American launch was a success; Sony claimed 500,000 units were sold in the first two days of sales, though it was also reported that this figure was below expectations.

Launch PSP units in North America included the film Spider-Man 2 on a UMD disc. In April 2005, Sony would launch a dedicated line of movies for the system to retail, dubbed UMD Video for PSP, with the first titles for the format including Hellboy, Once Upon a Time in Mexico, Resident Evil: Apocalypse, and XXX.

The PSP was originally intended to have a simultaneous European and North American launch, but on March 15, 2005, Sony announced that the European and Oceania launch would be delayed due to high demand for the console in Japan and North America. In April, Sony announced that the PSP would be launched in Europe on September 1, 2005, for €249/£179. Sony defended the high price by saying North American consumers had to pay local sales taxes and that the Value Added Tax (sales tax) was higher in the UK than the US. Despite the high price, the PSP's launch in Europe was a success, with the console selling over 185,000 units in the UK. All stock of the PSP in the UK sold out within three hours of its launch, more than doubling the previous first-day sales record of 87,000 units set by the Nintendo DS. The system also enjoyed success in Oceania and the rest of Europe; over 25,000 units were pre-ordered in Australia, and nearly one million units were sold across Europe in the system's first week of sales.

In November of 2005, Sony started re-releasing PSP titles under their The Best budget line in Japan, with Europe following with their Platinum line in June 2006. At E3 2006, Sony Computer Entertainment America announced that their Greatest Hits range of budget titles were to be extended to the PSP system in July, with games in the line retailing for $19.99.

By 2006, studios began to pull out of the UMD Video format. An executive at Universal Studios Home Entertainment would anonymously report to CNET that sales were "near zilch". Paramount Pictures Home Entertainment would also put their releases on hiatus, with an executive claiming "No one’s even breaking even on them. [sic]"

In 2009, the PSP's box design would receive a redesign to match with the PlayStation 3's rebranding, though PSP's logo remained unchanged.

=== Later years and discontinuation ===
Rumors of a successor to the PSP, often dubbed PSP2, would circulate the internet as early as 2009, with Eurogamer Spain reporting on reported technical specifications of the device. In January 2011, Sony would officially unveil the system at a "PlayStation Meeting" press conference, initially dubbing it NGP (Next Generation Portable). At E3 2011, the system would be officially dubbed PlayStation Vita, and would launch in Japan on December 17, 2011. At launch, the system supported digital PSP games via backwards compatibility.

Although Sony's game output would mostly cease after the Vita's launch, third party publishers would continue to support the system until 2016. Internationally, after the Vita launched, many PSP games released earlier in the system's life in Japan, such as The Legend of Heroes: Trails in the Sky SC and Brandish: The Dark Revenant, would be localized into English and released digitally, facilitating purchase and play on both PSP and Vita via backwards compatibility.

By June 2014, Sony would cease shipments of PSP hardware worldwide. Sony reports that the system sold 80 million units in total. The PlayStation Store on PSP would be shut down in 2016, though compatible software purchased on a PS3, PS Vita, or web browser would still be downloadable; The web storefront was shut down in 2020, and the PS3 and PS Vita storefronts are set to shut down in 2027.

== Hardware ==
=== PSP-1000 ===
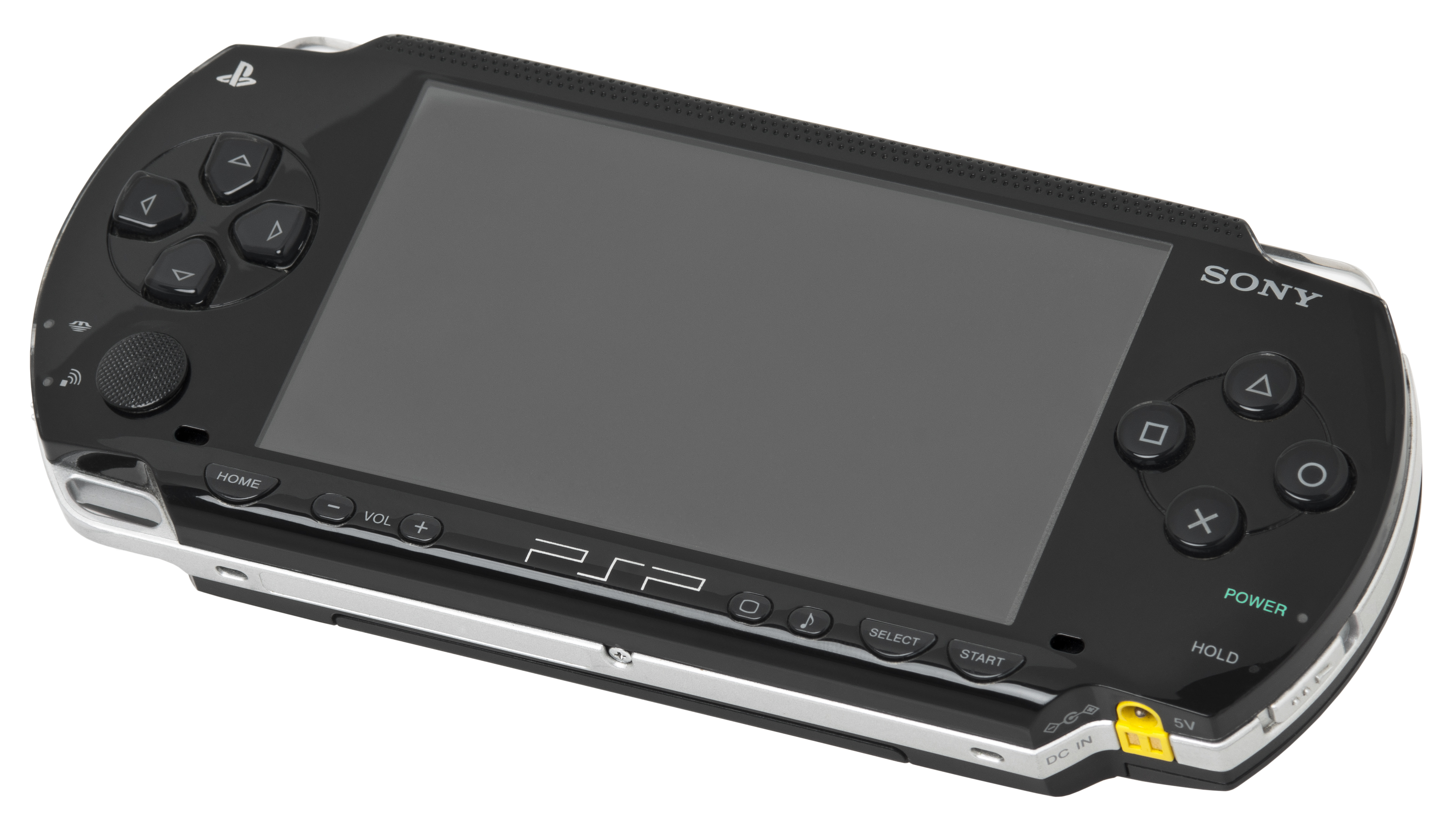
A PSP-1000: the shoulder buttons are on top, the directional pad on the left with the analog stick directly below it, the PlayStation face buttons on the right and a row of secondary buttons below the screen.

The launch model of the PlayStation Portable, referred to as the PSP-1000, features an oblong form factor measuring 6.7 by 2.9 by 0.9 inches (170 by 74 by 23 mm). The front of the system features the speakers as well as most of the system's controls, including the face buttons, d-pad, and analog stick, with other function buttons below the screen. It also contains the system's 4.3-inch (110 mm) TFT display, which is capable of 480 × 272 pixel display resolution and 24-bit color. The top of the system contains the two shoulder buttons, labelled L and R, the Wireless LAN and UMD eject switches, an IrDA infrared emitter, and a Mini USB port for data transfer. Below the system is the AC-in and 2-pin dock ports for charging, as well as the 3.5 mm audio and remote ports. The left and right sides of the system have the Memory Stick PRO Duo slot and power switch, respectively. The back gives access to the UMD drive and battery slot when either are uncovered. As a whole, the unit weighs 9.9 ounces (280 g).

Internally, the PSP uses two 333 MHz MIPS32 R4000 R4k-based CPUs, a GPU running at 166 MHz, and includes 32 MB main RAM, and 4 MB embedded DRAM split between the GPU and Media Engine. Despite the CPU's native clock speed, media would be locked to a maximum of 222 MHz until firmware 3.50 released in May 2007, when Sony allowed developers to release new games at its native 333 MHz speed.

The PSP-1000 is powered by an 1800 mAh battery that provides about three to six hours of gameplay, four to five hours of video playback, and eight to eleven hours of audio playback. The battery completes a full charge after about 1.5 hours.

=== Revisions ===
==== PSP-2000 ====
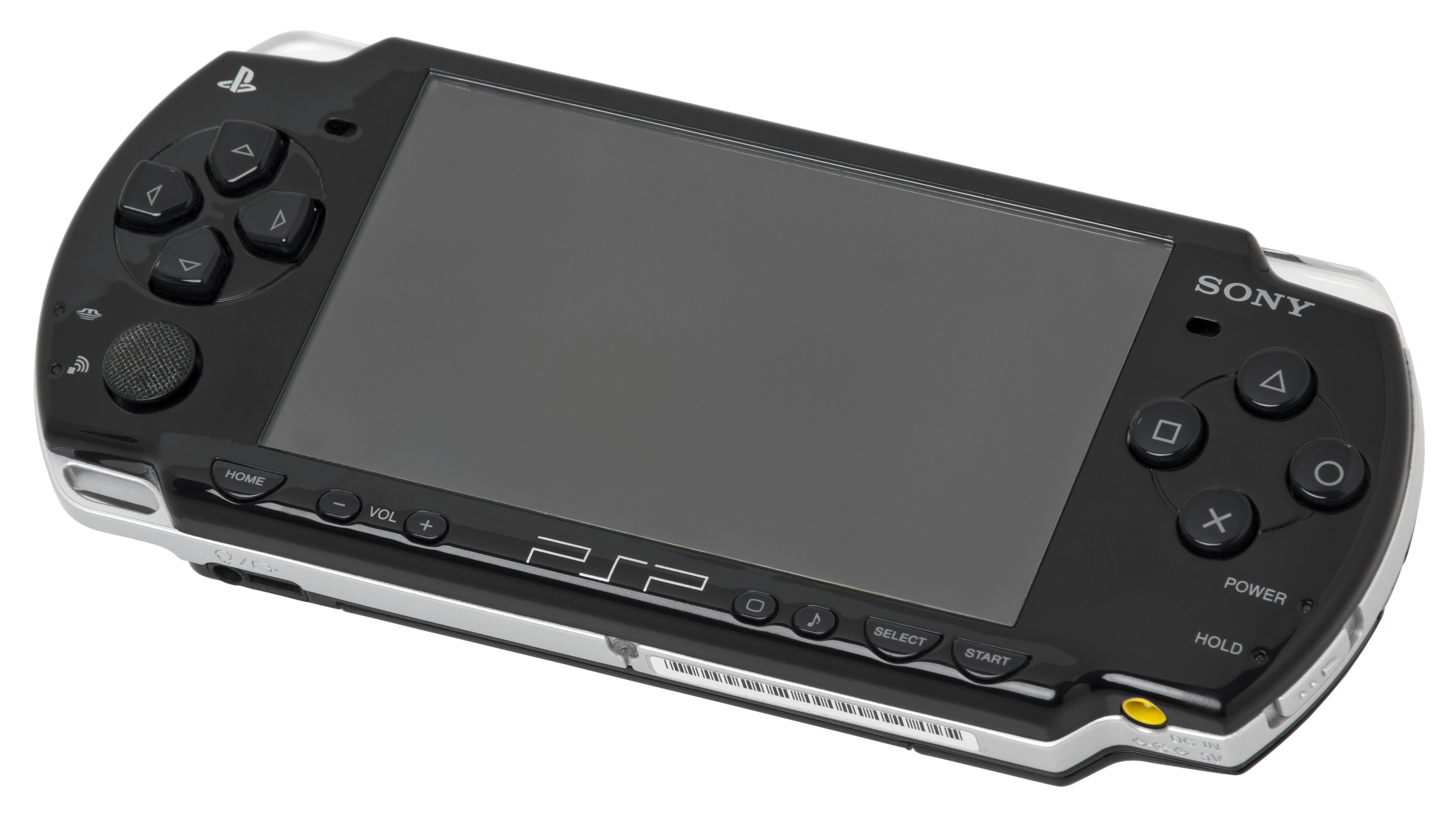
Visually compared to the PSP-1000, the PSP-2000 (shown) is thinner, moved the speakers lower, and has a reworked remote connector to accommodate a video output cable.

At E3 2007, Sony announced a new revision of the PSP. The PSP-2000, marketed in some regions as "PSP Slim & Lite", would first be released in Hong Kong on August 30, 2007, before releasing worldwide in September of that year. The revision would redesign the system to reduce weight and thickness, from 9.87 to 6.66 ounces (280 to 189 g) and from 0.91 to 0.73 inches (23 to 18.6 mm), respectively. In addition, the serial port was modified to add video out support, with support for 480i output of media via composite, S-Video, component, and D-Terminal, with the latter two also supporting game output in 480p.

Other changes include improved WLAN modules, the removal of the IrDA emitter and 2-pin docking port, a simplified UMD drive mechanism, and a thinner, brighter LCD screen. To improve the poor loading times of UMD games on the original PSP, the internal memory (RAM and Flash ROM) was doubled from 32 MB to 64 MB, part of which now acting as a cache. Web browser performance was also improved thanks to the increased memory.

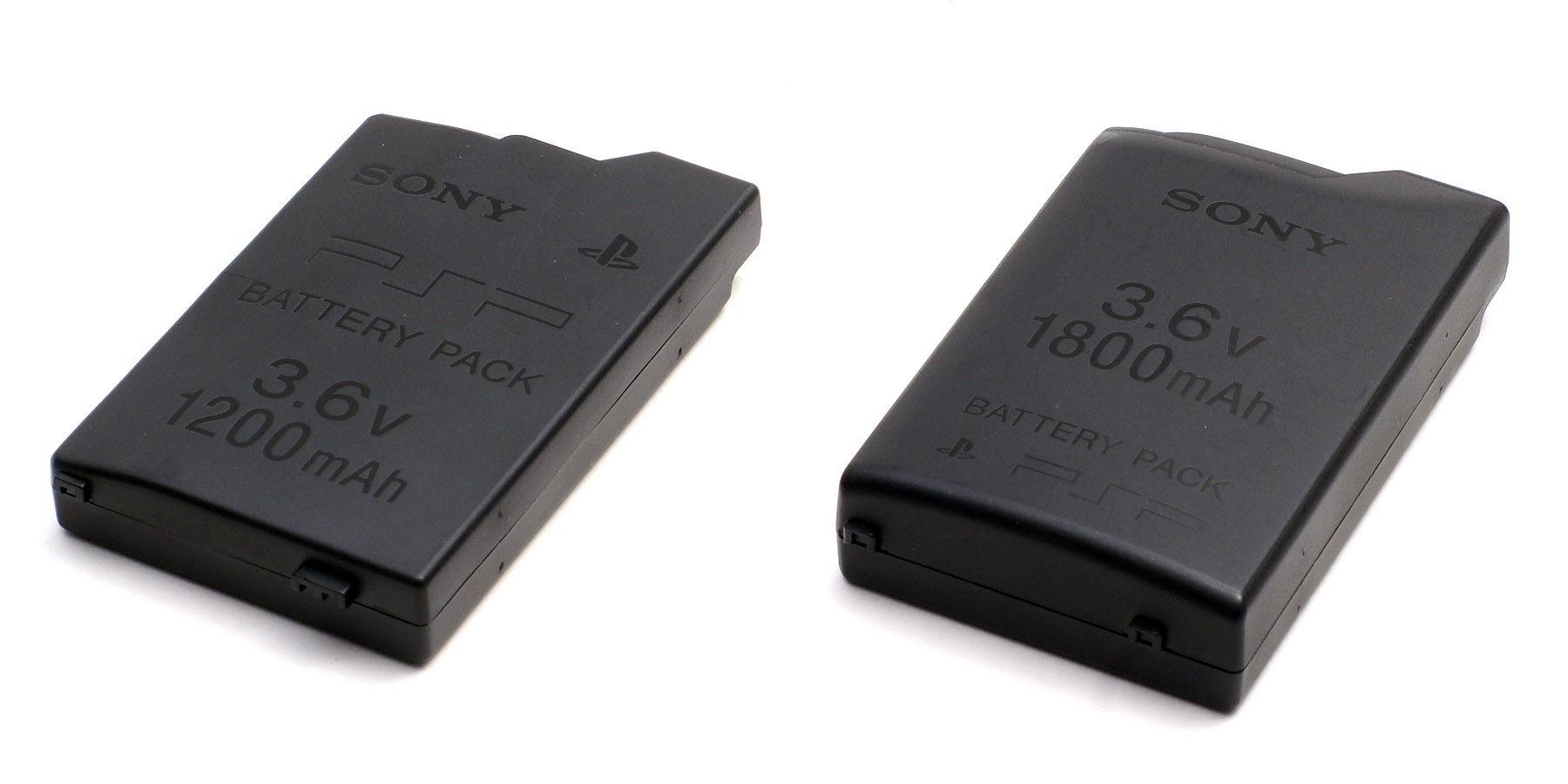
The stock battery included with the PSP-2000 (left) decreased in size and capacity compared to the PSP-1000 battery (right) to maintain a slim form factor.

To make the unit slimmer, the capacity of the PSP's battery was reduced from 1800 mAh to 1200 mAh starting with the PSP-2000. The original high-capacity batteries work on newer models with increased battery life, though the battery cover does not fit. In 2008, Sony would release the Extended Life Battery Kit, which included a bulkier 2200 mAh battery with fitting battery covers. All versions of the North American kit were supplied with covers in black and silver, while Japan would receive stock with additional color variants.

==== PSP-3000 ====
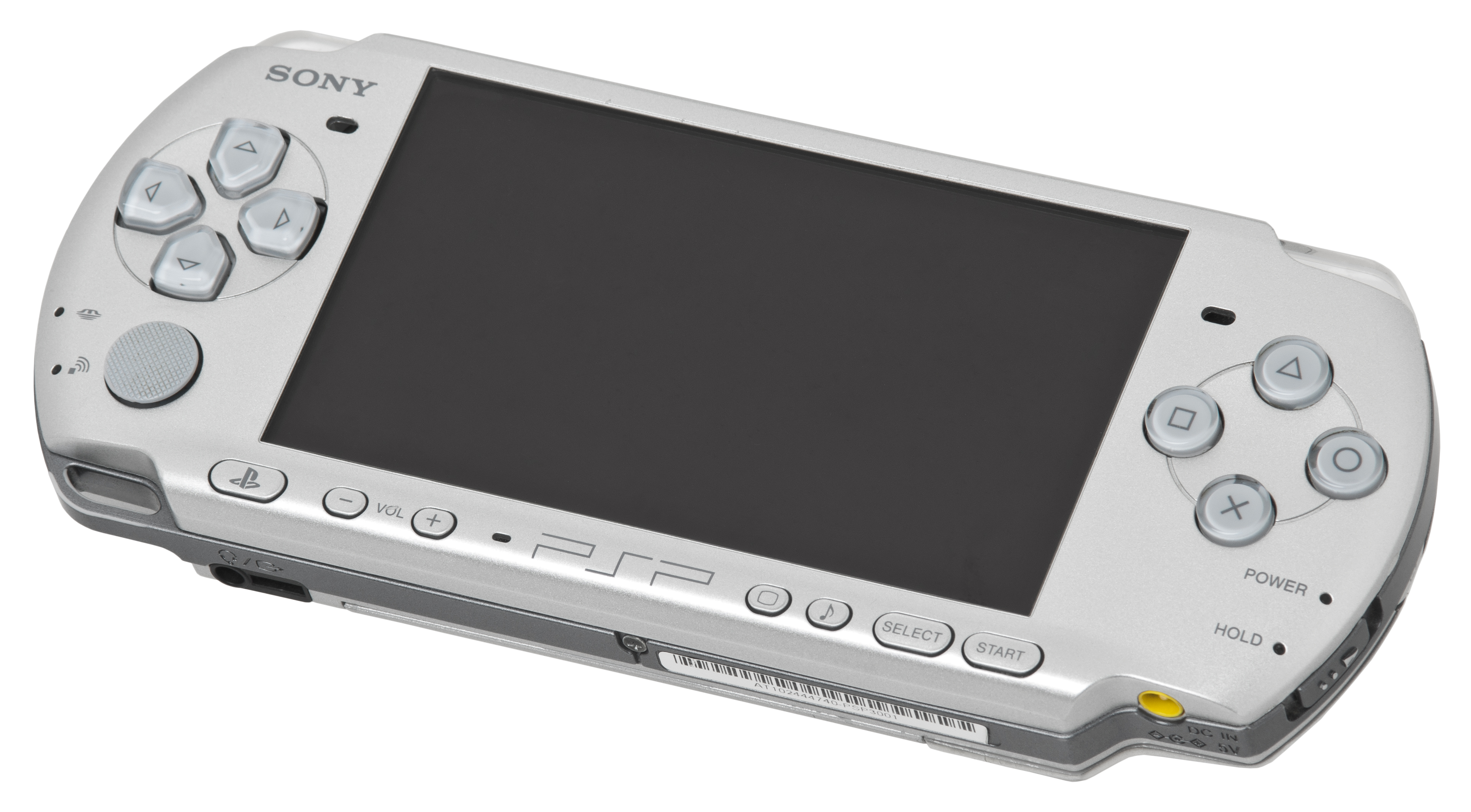
A white PSP-3000. The function buttons below the screen are rounded, and the Home button has been replaced with a functionally identical PlayStation button. A microphone was added next to the volume buttons.

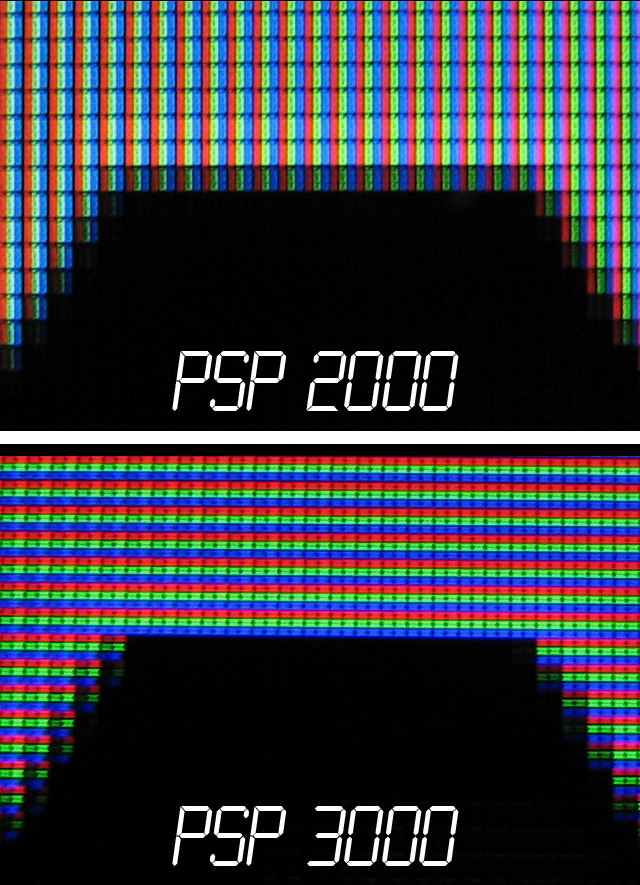
The PSP-3000's screen would switch to horizontal sub-pixels, resulting in what appeared to be scan-line and interlacing artifacts.

The PSP-3000 was announced on August 21, 2008 at the Leipzig Games Convention, and would release worldwide in October of that year. The PSP-3000 was primarily sold as having an improved LCD screen with an increased color range, five times the contrast ratio, a halved pixel response time, and anti-reflective technology to reduce outdoor glare. A microphone was also added to the system. Games could now be output in standard definition using the video-out cable, and more settings were added for the video out, such as flicker reduction, to allow users to tune the video output to their tastes. CNET would refer to this model as a "minor upgrade".

On its release, the PSP-3000's screen was criticized for what appeared to be scan-lines and interlacing artifacts when objects were in motion. Due to the new screen using horizontal sub-pixels, and the blue sub-pixels appearing less bright than their red and green counterparts, the blue sub-pixels would create faint horizontal lines across the screen. Sony stated the issue was inherent to the hardware and would not be fixed.

==== PSP Go (N1000) ====
Logo for PSP Go

Intended to be revealed at E3 2009, Sony accidentally unveiled a radically redesigned PSP system early through their own Qore video on demand service. At E3 2009, Sony would jokingly refer to the redesign as the "worst kept secret of E3". This system, modeled PSP-N1000 and sold as PSP Go, would release in October 2009.

The unit is 43% lighter and 56% smaller than the original PSP-1000, and 16% lighter and 35% smaller than the PSP-3000. Its internal rechargeable battery is not user serviceable, unlike previous PSP systems. It has a 3.8-inch (97 mm) 480 × 272 pixel LCD screen, which slides up to reveal the main controls. The overall shape and sliding mechanism are similar to those of Sony's own mylo COM-2 Internet device.

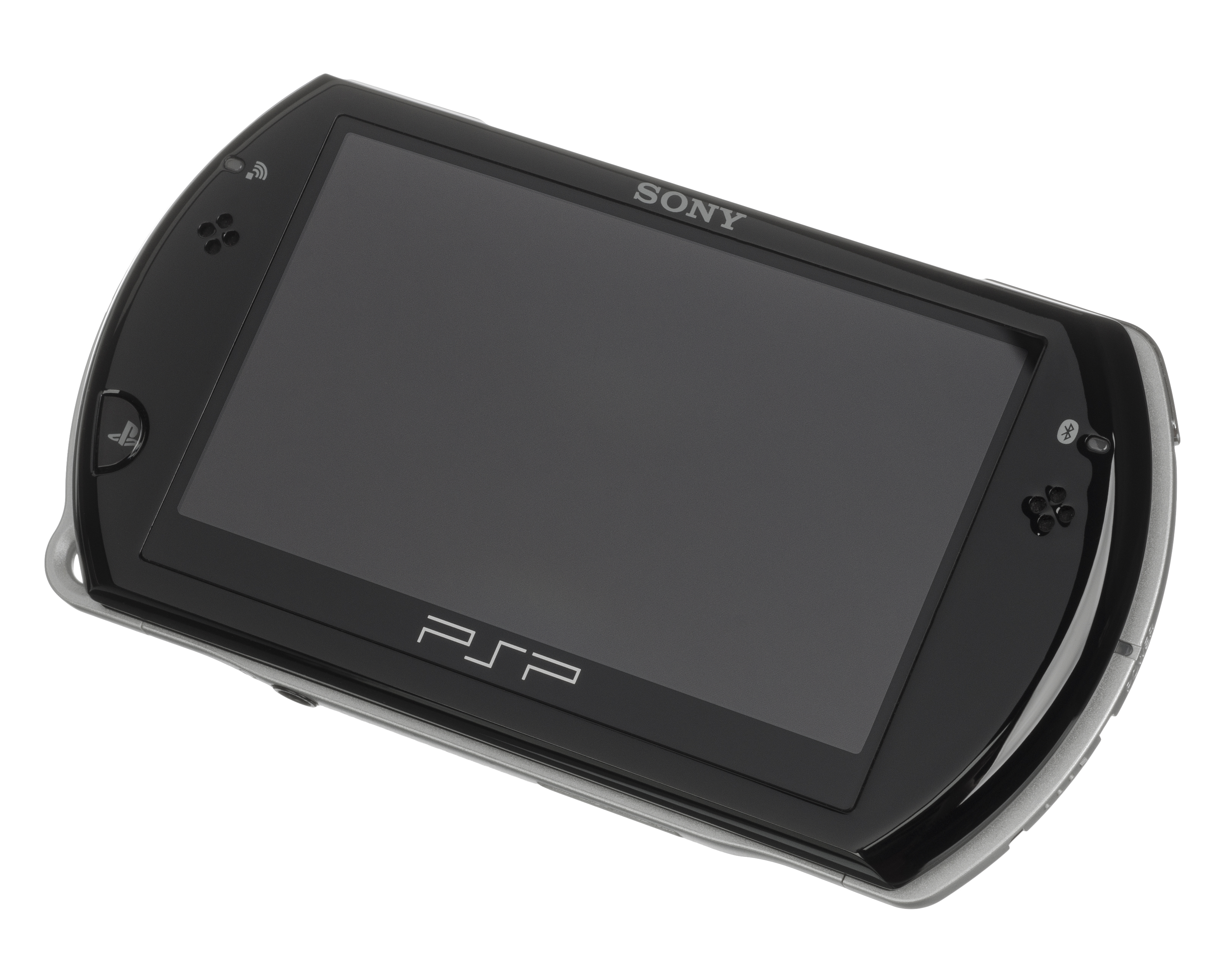
Front view of a closed PSP Go

The PSP Go features 802.11b Wi-Fi like its predecessors, although the Mini USB port was replaced with an included proprietary connector that handles power, data transfer, and video. Composite, component, and D-Terminal video cables were sold separately, as well as a cradle that allows both video out and power at the same time. Bluetooth support was also added to the PSP Go, allowing users to connect wireless audio devices and PlayStation 3 controllers, the latter officially requires a PS3 system for pairing.

The PSP Go lacks a UMD drive, instead opting to include 16 GB of internal flash memory. with additional space possible via a Memory Stick Micro (M2) port. Games must be purchased and downloaded from the PlayStation Store. While the PSP Go can download games to itself, users can also download and transfer content to the device from a PlayStation 3 console, or the Windows-based software Media Go.

All downloadable PSP and PlayStation games available prior to the model's launch are compatible with the PSP Go. Sony claimed that almost all UMD-based PSP games released after October 1, 2009, would be available to download, and that most older UMD-only games would also be released for digital download in the future. Despite this, some titles released after this date, such as Kingdom Hearts: Birth by Sleep, would not launch on the PlayStation Store, rendering them officially unplayable on the system.

The PSP Go suffered from low consumer interest, with Kaz Hirai citing its high price point and piracy as factors for its poor performance. By February 2010, Sony was rumored to be considering a relaunch for the system, and by June Sony started bundling the console with free games to increase its value proposition. The system received a worldwide price cut that October, and in April 2011, the PSP Go was announced to be discontinued outside of North America to concentrate resources on PlayStation Vita manufacturing.

==== PSP Street (E1000) ====
Front view of the PSP Street E1004

At Gamescom 2011, the PSP-E1000, also known as PSP Street, was announced as an entry-level PSP system. It released exclusively in Europe on October 26, 2011 at a budget price of €99.99. The E1000 came in a matte finish and lacked support for Wi-Fi, ad-hoc features, and stereo audio without headphones. The brightness button and microphone were also removed, requiring users to enter the system's "Power Save Settings" to adjust the brightness.

=== Bundles and console variants ===
When PlayStation Portable launched in Japan, it was available either in a standard configuration, which contained the system, battery, and charger, or in the Value Pack, which contained additional accessories, such as a 32-megabyte Memory Stick Duo. When the system launched in North America and Europe, only the Value Pack was available. Early North American systems were also bundled with the film Spider-Man 2 on UMD Video. The base configuration as launched in Japan became a standard bundle internationally in 2006.

Initially, the system was released in "Piano Black", though other color options would come over time, starting with a "Ceramic White" system launching in Japan in September 2005. At the PSP-2000's launch, multiple color options were available worldwide, including Piano Black, Ceramic White, and Ice Silver.

Limited edition PSP systems were sold throughout the system's life, usually to promote a bundled game. Some examples of games to get special edition systems include God of War: Chains of Olympus, Star Wars Battlefront: Renegade Squadron, Crisis Core: Final Fantasy VII, and Metal Gear Solid: Peace Walker. The Monster Hunter Portable Black Golden PSP-3000 system is notable for being physically different from the normal PSP-3000, as it has a concave analog stick and thicker grips to accommodate an Extended Battery pack.

=== Comparison ===
Below is a comparison of the different PlayStation Portable models:

Models	PSP-1000	PSP-2000	PSP-3000	PSP Go (PSP-N1000)	PSP Street (PSP-E1000)
Image	Piano Black PSP-1000	Piano Black PSP-2000	Silver PSP-3000	Piano Black PSPGo	PSP-E1000
Original release date	December 12, 2004 (Japan)	August 30, 2007 (Hong Kong)	October 14, 2008 (North America)	October 1, 2009 (North America and Europe)	October 26, 2011 (Europe)
Display resolution, type	480 × 272, TFT				
Display size	4.3 in (110 mm) 30:17			3.8 in (97 mm) 30:17	4.3 in (110 mm) 30:17
CPU	MIPS R4000 at 1~333 MHz				
RAM	32 MB	64 MB			
Internal storage	32 MB; reserved for system software	64 MB; reserved for system software		16 GB; shared between user and system software	64 MB; reserved for system software
Connectivity	USB 2.0, UMD, serial port, headphone jack, Memory Stick PRO Duo	USB 2.0, UMD, video out, headphone jack, Memory Stick PRO Duo	USB 2.0, UMD, video out, headphone jack, microphone, Memory Stick PRO Duo	All-in-one port, headphone jack, microphone, Memory Stick Micro (M2)	USB 2.0, UMD, headphone jack, Memory Stick PRO Duo
Wireless	802.11b Wi-Fi, IRDA	802.11b Wi-Fi		802.11b Wi-Fi, Bluetooth 2.0 + EDR	—N/a
Battery	3.6 V DC 1800 mAh removable battery	3.6 V DC 1200 mAh removable battery		3.6 V DC 930 mAh non removable battery	3.6 V DC 925 mAh non removable battery

== Software ==
=== System software ===
The PSP's custom operating system, referred to as the System Software, utilizes the XrossMediaBar interface previously used on the PSX. UMD content and downloaded media is accessed through this menu, and additional features, such as a web browser, Adobe Flash support, additional codecs for various media and PlayStation 3 connectivity, were added via system updates distributed both online and with UMD content. These updates also served to patch security vulnerabilities in the system. The most recent system version, 6.61, released on January 15, 2015.

For downloaded content, the management of media content of the PSP through a PC was handled by Sony's PSP Media Manager software for Windows, allowing transfer as well as music/video playback and backups. In 2009, the PSP Media Manager was replaced by Media Go. It was also possible to place media files on the Memory Stick directly.

=== Apps and functionality ===
==== Media playback ====
The PlayStation Portable officially supports multiple video and audio codecs for media playback off of a Memory Stick Duo. At launch, the system supported MP3 and ATRAC for audio, but would later support AAC, WAV and WMA, the latter of which requires internet authentication prior to usage. JPEG was also supported at launch for photos, followed by TIFF, GIF, BMP, and PNG support in Firmware 2.0. MP4 and AVI files are supported for video playback.

In 2009, Sony added the ability to install SensMe onto the PSP. Originating on some Walkman music players and Sony Ericsson phones, SensMe is a music analyzer that can read music files on the PSP and categorize them into 'channels" representing moods, creating automatic playlists from there.

The same year, introduced with firmware 6.20, Sony added a Digital Comic reader, with a selection of comics from publishers such as Marvel Comics, IDW Publishing, Enterbrain, and Shueisha. Comics could be purchased on the PlayStation Store. The Digital Comics service would be discontinued in September 2012.

==== Internet capabilities ====
===== Web browser =====
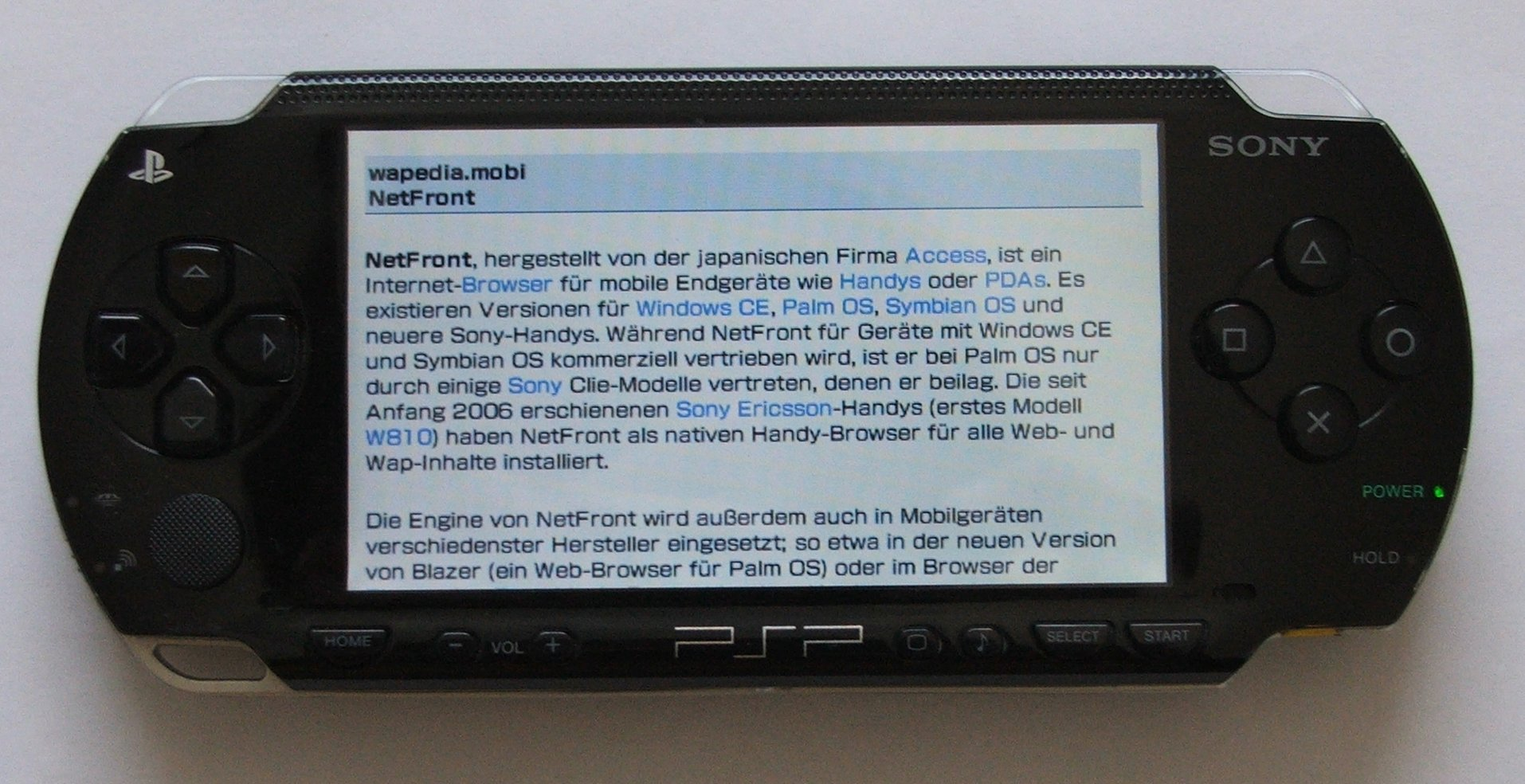
Web browser on a PSP-1000

The PSP Internet Browser is a version of the NetFront browser and came with the system via the 2.00 update. The browser supports most common web technologies, such as HTTP cookies, forms, CSS, and basic JavaScript. It features basic tabbed browsing and has a maximum of three tabs.

===== Remote Play =====
Remote Play allows the PSP to access many of the features of the PlayStation 3 console from a remote location using the PS3's WLAN capabilities, a home network, or the Internet. Using Remote Play, users can view photographs, listen to music, play PlayStation and select PlayStation 3 games, and watch videos stored on the PS3 or connected USB devices. Remote Play also allows the PS3 to be turned on and off remotely and lets the PSP control audio playback from the PS3 to a home theater system. Although most of the PS3's media capabilities are accessible with Remote Play, playback of DVDs, Blu-ray Discs, PlayStation 2 games, most PlayStation 3 games, and copy-protected files stored on the hard drive are not supported.

===== Skype for PSP =====
Starting with System Software version 3.90, the PSP 2000, 3000, and Go were given the ability to make calls with the Skype VoIP service. The service allowed Skype calls to be made over Wi-Fi and – on the Go – over the Bluetooth modem. Users had to purchase Skype credit to make telephone calls. Skype for PlayStation Portable was discontinued on June 22, 2016.

===== Room for PlayStation Portable =====
At Tokyo Game Show 2009, Sony announced that a service similar to PlayStation Home, the PS3's online community-based service, was being developed for the PSP. Named "Room" (stylized R∞M), it was being beta-tested in Japan from October 2009 to April 2010. It could be launched directly from the PlayStation Network section of the XMB. As in Home, PSP owners would have been able to invite other PSP owners into their rooms to "enjoy real time communication". Development of Room halted on April 15, 2010, due to feedback from the community.

=== Homebrew development and custom firmware ===
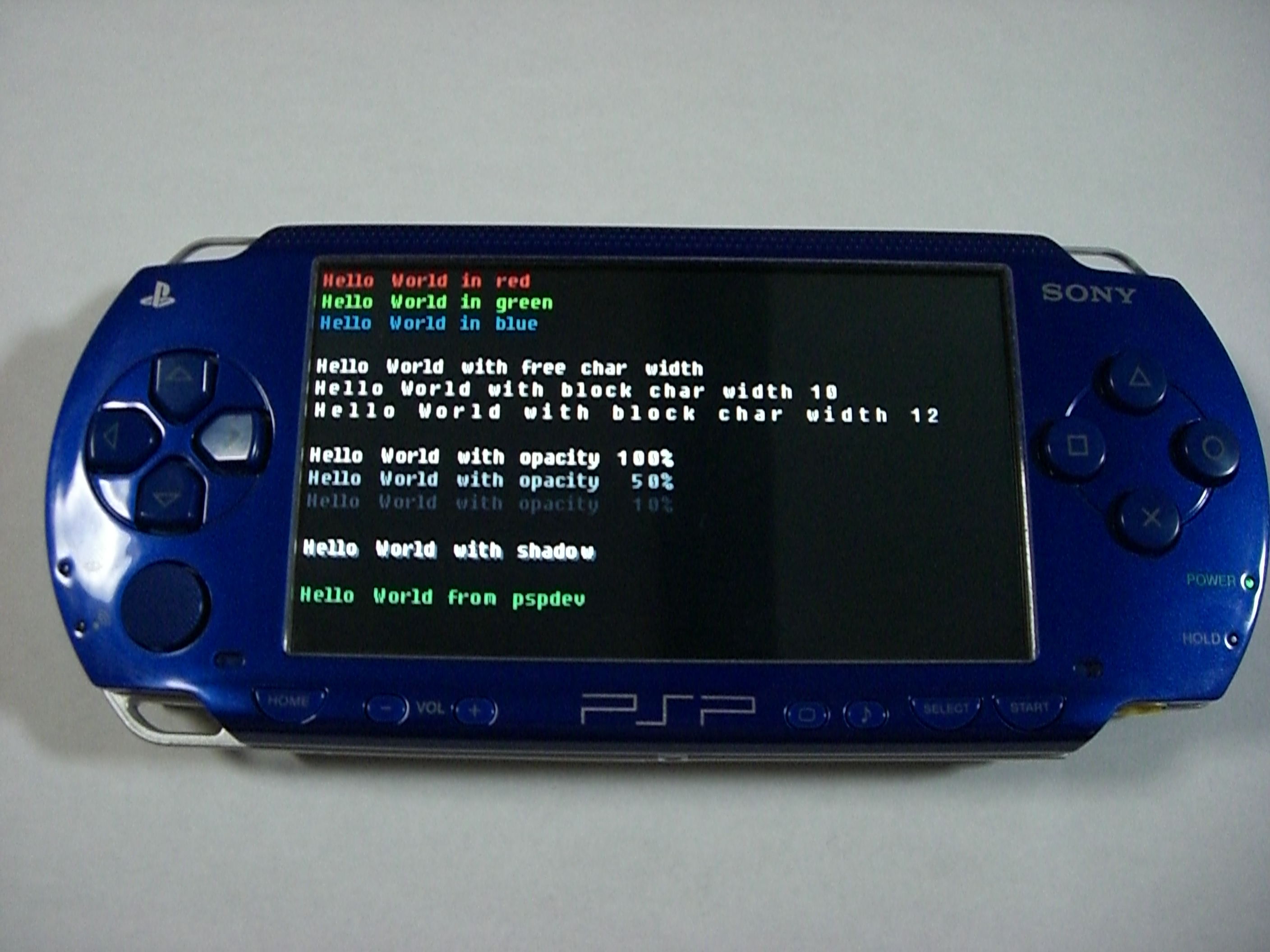
Metallic Blue PSP 1000 running a "Hello, World!" program

On June 15, 2005, it was reported that hackers had learned how to bypass the PSP's security measures to run unauthorized game files and homebrew. Sony would patch the security flaw soon after with a firmware update, but hackers would continue to find exploits and vulnerabilities in the PSP firmware. In response, Sony would begin requiring minimum firmware versions to play select titles. They would also include new features, such as a web browser and greater multimedia support, in newer updates to encourage people to upgrade, a move that BusinessWeek would dub a "carrot-and-stick" approach. Peter Dille, SCEA Senior Vice President of Marketing, claimed that many third parties were "just about ready to jump off the cliff and pull support for the platform" due to rampant piracy caused by custom firmware.

== Games ==
A physical PSP game on a Universal Media Disc

Worldwide, there were 1,370 games released for the PSP between 2004 and 2016. At launch, all games were strictly released on UMD, but in October 2008, Sony launched the PlayStation Store for PSP games, facilitating digital distribution of available titles. By 2009, Sony introduced the PlayStation mini line of games, which were smaller-scale digital-only PSP games, and promised all future major releases on UMD would come digitally.

In addition to standard PlayStation Portable software, digitally released PSone Classics also became playable on PSP via firmware 3.00, though they needed to be installed from a PlayStation 3 system until the PlayStation Store launched on PSP. In 2009, Turbografx-16 games were also added to the PlayStation Store.

The best selling PSP game is Grand Theft Auto: Liberty City Stories, which has sold 7.5 million copies as of July 20, 2013. Other top-selling PSP games include Grand Theft Auto: Vice City Stories, Monster Hunter Portable 3rd, Gran Turismo, and Monster Hunter Freedom Unite. The final physical UMD releases was Kamigami no Asobi InFinite, released in Japan on April 21, 2016, with Retro City Rampage DX following as the final digital release in July 2016. Retro City Rampage DX was intended to get a UMD release, but ultimately couldn't because disc production "halted without warning".

Trophy support was planned for the PSP but the idea was cancelled after the firmware was cracked, as Sony feared that hacked systems could allow players to illegitimately unlock or manipulate trophies.

== Peripherals ==
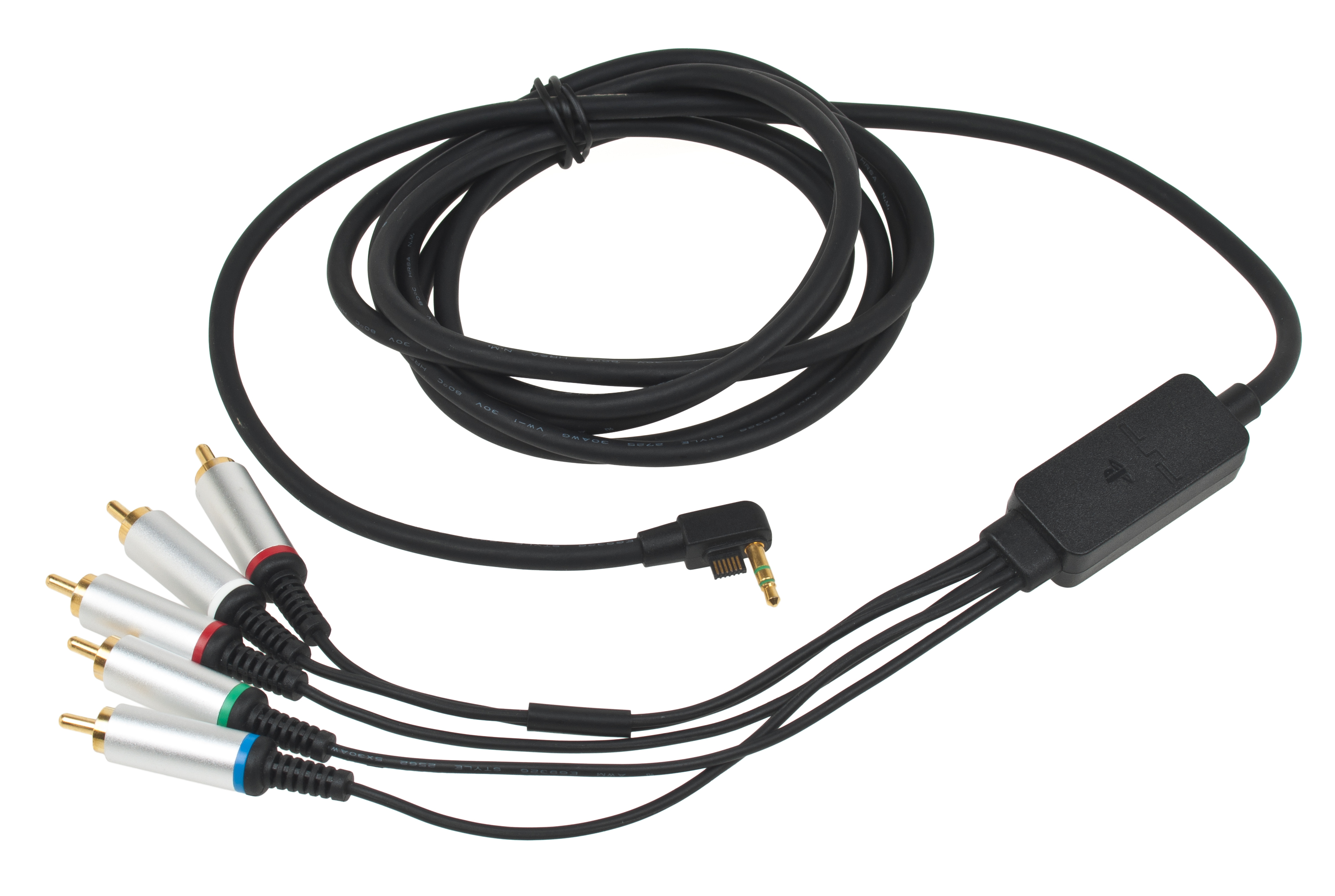
Component video cable, which allows PSP-2000 and 3000 models to output analog stereo audio and analog component (YP_{B}P_{R}) video

At the Japanese launch, there were multiple accessories for the system including a Memory Stick Duo for save games, a headphone remote for audio playback, and a soft pouch with a wrist strap. The Value Pack bundle included all of the launch accessories not included with the base system.

Some PSP accessories gave the system added functionality by connecting to the system's Mini-USB port. A GPS add-on was released for the PSP system in 2006, giving the system GPS navigation functionality with the included software. Metal Gear Solid: Portable Ops also utilized the GPS receiver as a method of obtaining recruits in-game. Additionally, a 1seg television tuner peripheral was released in Japan on September 20, 2007, giving the system the ability to view digital television signals in regions that use the 1seg standard.

Two camera add-ons for the PSP were released throughout the system's life. The PSP 300 E was released in Autumn 2006, and had a 1.3 megapixel camera capable of photos at up to 1280x960 resolution. The PSP 450x, released in September 2009 alongside Invizimals, had a 0.3 megapixel camera capable of photos up to 640x480.

The PSP-2000, 3000, and PSP Go had composite, component, and D-Terminal video out cables available separately to allow the system to display its video onto a TV. The PSP 2000 and 3000 supported the same cables, while the PSP Go had its own separate cables. S-video cables were also released for the PSP-2000 and 3000.

Because of the PSP Go using a proprietary connector instead of Mini-USB, accessories that utilized the port are incompatible with the system by default, though Sony sold the Converter Cable Adapter alongside the system's launch which places a Mini-USB port atop the system to regain compatibility with prior accessories.

== Reception ==
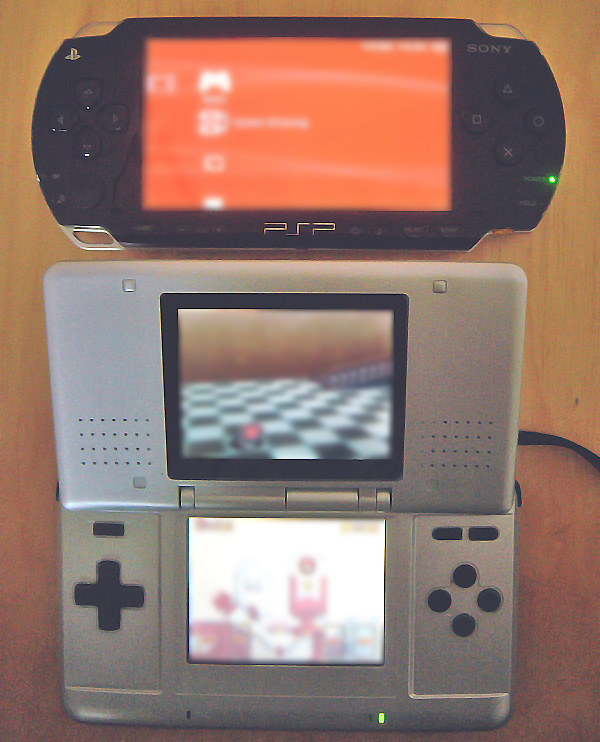
PlayStation Portable (top) and Nintendo DS (bottom). All of the screens are fogged out.

The PSP received generally positive reviews soon after launch; most reviewers noted similar strengths and weaknesses. CNET awarded the system 8.5 out of 10 and praised the console's powerful hardware and its multimedia capabilities but lamented the lack of a guard to cover the screen and the reading surface of UMD discs. Engadget praised the console's design, stating that "it is definitely one well-designed, slick little handheld". PC World commended the built-in Wi-Fi capability but criticized the lack of a web browser at launch, and the glare and smudges that resulted from the console's glossy exterior. Most reviewers also praised the console's large, bright viewing screen and its audio and video playback capabilities. In 2008, Time listed the PSP as a "gotta have travel gadget", citing the console's movie selection, telecommunications capability, and upcoming GPS functionality.

The PlayStation Portable was initially seen as superior to the Nintendo DS when both devices were revealed in early 2004 because of the designers' emphasis on the technical accomplishments of the system. Nintendo of America President Reggie Fils-Aime, however, focused on the experience aspect of the Nintendo DS. The DS started to become more popular than the PSP early on because it attracted more third-party developers, and appealed more to the casual gaming market. The DS sold more units partly because of its touchscreen and second display.

From a multimedia perspective, the PSP has also been seen as a competitor to portable media players, notably the iPod Video that was released in the same year.

Reviews of the PSP Go were mixed, with heavy criticism stemming from its initial pricing; Ars Technica called it "way too expensive" and The Guardian stated that cost was the "biggest issue" facing the machine. Engadget said the Go cost only $50 less than the PS3, which has a Blu-ray player, and Wired said the older PSP-3000 model was cheaper and supports UMDs. The placement of the analog stick next to the D-pad was also criticized. Reviewers also commented on the change from a mini-USB port to a proprietary port, making hardware and cables bought for previous models incompatible. The Go's screen was positively received by Ars Technica, which called the screen's image "brilliant, sharp and clear" and T3 stated that "pictures and videos look great". The controls received mixed reviews; The Times described them as "instantly familiar" whereas CNET and Stuff called the position of the analog stick "awkward". The device's capability to use a PS3 controller was praised by The New Zealand Herald but Ars Technica criticized the need to connect the controller and the Go to a PS3 for initial setup.

=== Sales ===
Region	Units sold	First available
Japan	19 million (as of April 28, 2013)	December 12, 2004
United States	17 million (as of March 14, 2010)	March 24, 2005
Europe	12 million (as of May 6, 2008)	September 1, 2005
France	3.58 million (as of January 1, 2016)	September 1, 2005
United Kingdom	3.2 million (as of January 3, 2009)	September 1, 2005
Spain	2.8 million (as of December 2008)	September 1, 2005
Worldwide	80 million (as of March 31, 2015)	December 12, 2004

By March 31, 2007, the PlayStation Portable had shipped 25.39 million units worldwide with 6.92 million in Asia, 9.58 million in North America, and 8.89 million Europe. In Europe, the PSP sold 4 million units in 2006 and 3.1 million in 2007, according to estimates by Electronic Arts. In 2007, the PSP sold 3.82 million units in the US, according to the NPD Group and about 3 million units in Japan, according to Enterbrain.

In Japan, during the week March 24–30, 2008, the PSP nearly outsold all of the other game consoles combined, selling 129,986 units, some of which were bundled with Monster Hunter Portable 2nd G,which was the bestselling game in that week, according to Media Create.

From 2006 to the third quarter of 2010, the PSP sold 53 million units. In a 2009 interview, Peter Dillon, Sony's senior vice-president of marketing, blamed piracy of video games for lower sales than hoped.

== Marketing controversies ==
In late 2005, Sony said it had hired graffiti artists to spray-paint advertisements for the PSP in seven major U.S. cities, including New York City, Atlanta, Philadelphia, and San Francisco. According to Sony, it was paying businesses and building owners for the right to spray-paint their walls. A year later, Sony ran a poster campaign in England; a poster bearing the slogan "Take a running jump here" was removed from a Manchester Piccadilly station tram platform due to concerns it might encourage suicide.

Later in 2006, news of a billboard advertisement released in the Netherlands depicting a white woman holding a black woman by the jaw, saying "PlayStation Portable: White is coming", spread. Sony's stated purpose was to contrast the white and black versions of the PSP, but the advertisements were interpreted as being racially charged. These advertisements were never released in the rest of the world and were withdrawn from the Netherlands after the controversy. The advertisement attracted international press coverage; Engadget speculated Sony may have hoped to "capitalize on a PR firestorm".

Also in 2006, Sony came under scrutiny online for a guerrilla marketing campaign in which advertisers posed as young bloggers who desperately wanted a PSP. The site, alliwantforxmasisapsp.com, appeared to have been designed by two friends and featured downloadable PSP greetings cards and t-shirt transfers. It also hosted a video showing "Cousin Pete" rapping about the handheld. The authors described the blog as "Consider us your own personal psp hype machine, here to help you wage a holiday assault on ur parents, girl, granny, boss - whoever - so they know what you really want, [sic]". The blog entries were written in a mixture of "leetspeak" and "smacktard". "i (charlie) have a psp. my friend jeremy does not. but he wants one this year for xmas," fake authors "c&j" wrote, "so we started clowning with sum not-so-subtle hints to j's parents that a psp would be teh perfect gift. we created this site to spread the luv to those like j who want a psp!" Additionally, the blog author also uploaded a video of a guy rapping about wanting a PSP for Christmas. Sony and Zipatoni were outed on the blog itself by tech-savvy critics who reportedly found the blog's registration data through an online search, and tracked it back to Gregory Meyerkord at advertising firm Zipatoni.

== See also ==
- Sony Ericsson Xperia Play
- PPSSPP
- PlayStation Portal
