= Dolby Atmos =

Object-based surround sound technology

- Inventor: Dolby
- Inception: 2012
- Website: dolby.com/technologies/dolby-atmos

Dolby Atmos is a surround sound and spatial sound technology developed by Dolby Laboratories. It expands on existing surround sound systems by adding height channels as well as free-moving sound objects, interpreted as three-dimensional objects with neither horizontal nor vertical limitations. Following the release of Atmos for the cinema market, a variety of consumer technologies have been released under the Atmos brand. The initial cinema Atmos systems used in-ceiling speakers, then upward-firing speakers (e.g. for soundbars) were introduced as an alternative for consumer products. Atmos is also used on some devices that do not have a height channel, such as headphones, televisions, mobile phones, and tablets.

== History ==
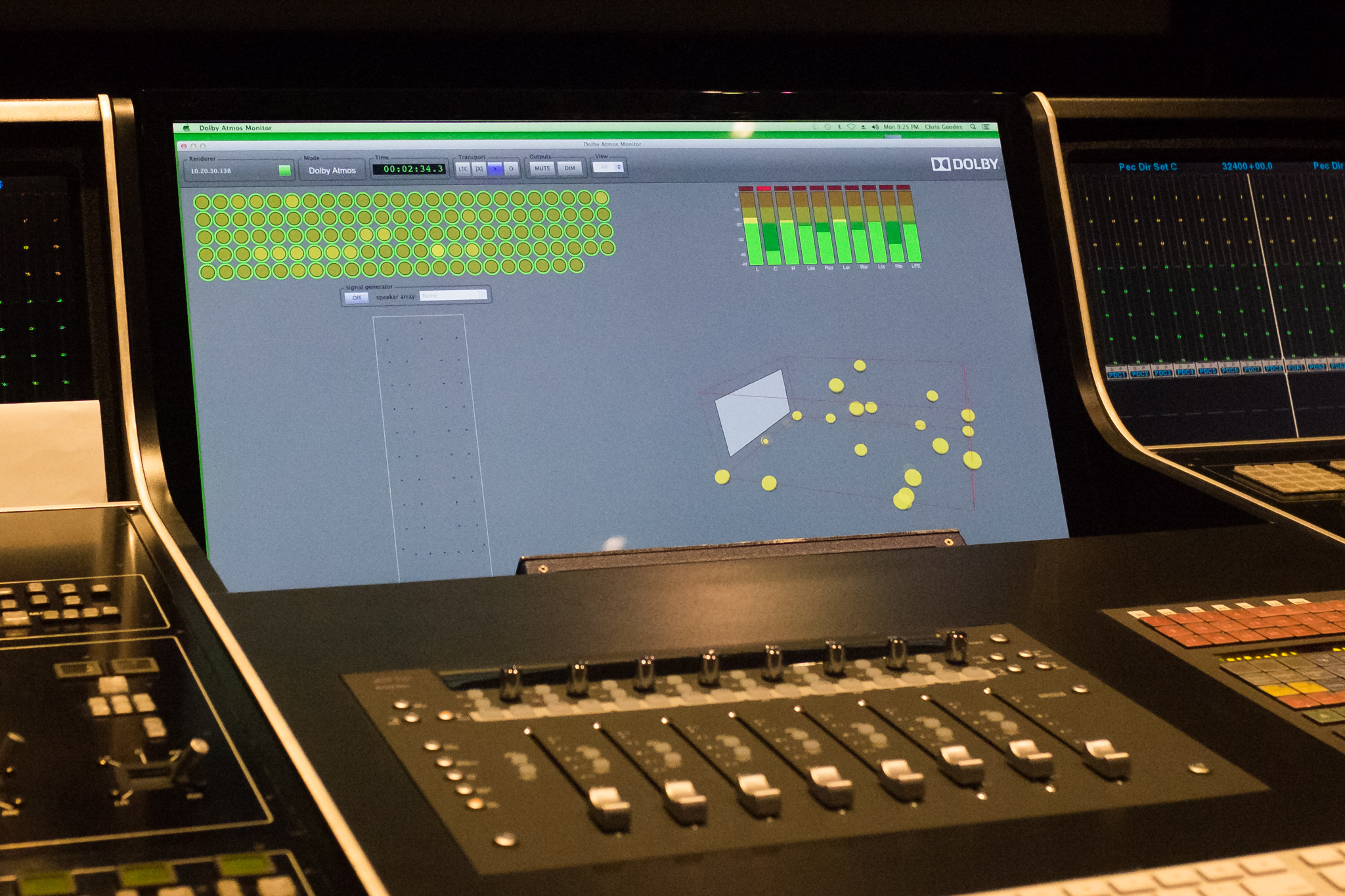
Dolby Atmos Monitor at SoundFirm, Melbourne, Australia

The first Dolby Atmos installation was in the El Capitan Theatre in Los Angeles, for the premiere of Brave in June 2012. Throughout 2012, it saw a limited release of about 25 installations worldwide, with an increase to more than 300 locations in 2013. As of April 2023, there were over 7,800 cinema screens, across 105 countries, which supported or were committed to support Dolby Atmos. Dolby Atmos has also been adapted to a home theater format and is the audio component of Dolby Cinema. Electronic devices from 2016 onwards, along with smartphones starting in 2017, have included support for Dolby Atmos recording and mixing capabilities. The full set of technical specifications for Dolby Digital Plus with Dolby Atmos are standardized and published in ETSI TS 103 420.

In 2016, Power was the first television show natively mixed and broadcast in Atmos for its third season, though in the same year, Game of Thrones upmixed their previous 5.1 presentations for the Blu-ray and Ultra HD Blu-ray reissue. R.E.M.'s 1992 album Automatic for the People was the first major music release with its 25th anniversary reissue in 2017.

== Technology ==
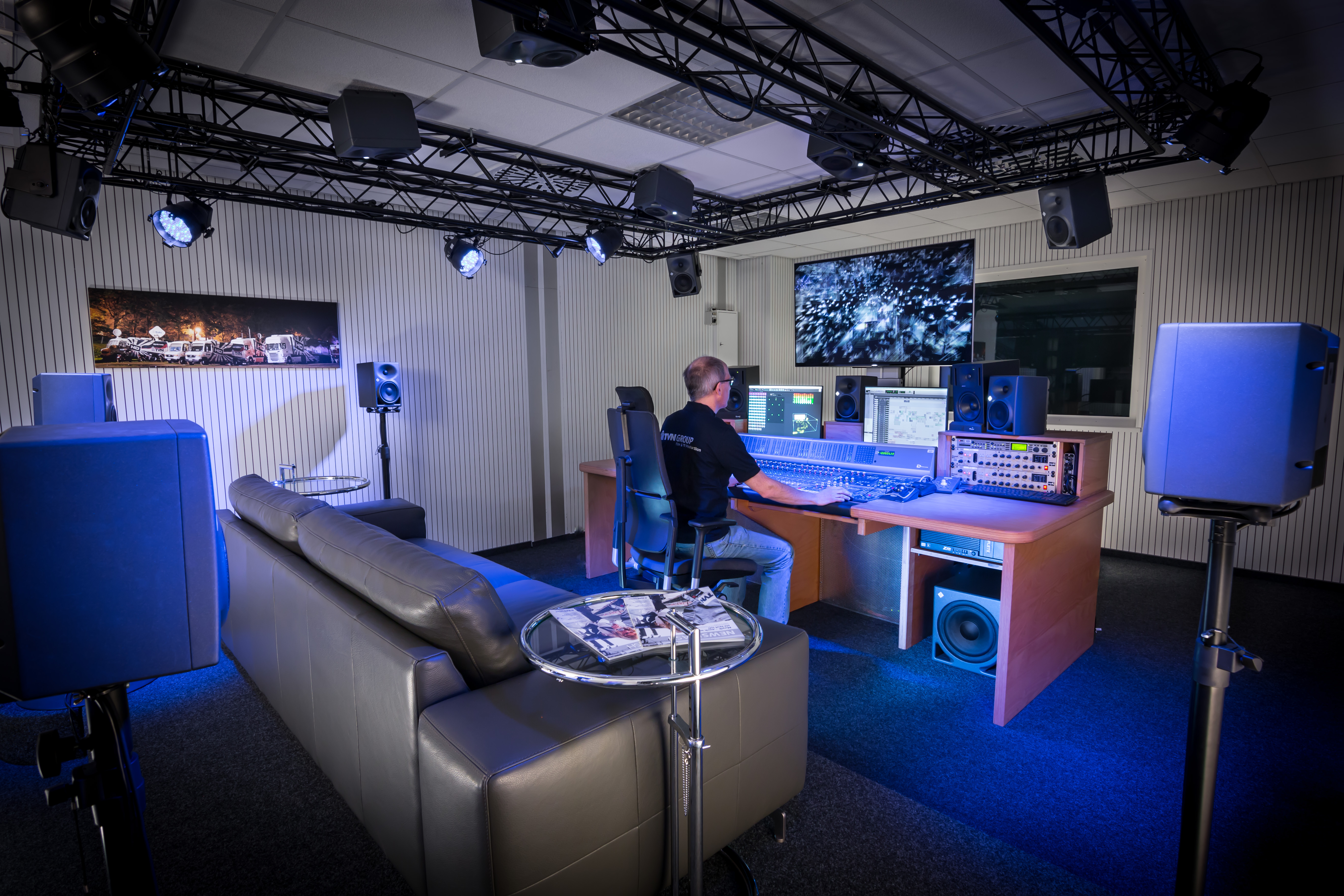
Dolby Atmos studio at a media company in Hanover, Germany

Dolby Atmos technology allows the storage and distribution of 128 audio tracks with metadata describing sound properties such as position and volume (and their variation over time). The audio mix is rendered specifically for the theater's setup using the loudspeakers available. Each audio track can be assigned to an audio channel, the conventional format for distribution, or to an audio "object". Dolby Atmos in theaters has a 9.1 (commonly referred to as 7.1.2) channel-based "bed" channels for ambience stems or center dialogue, leaving 118 tracks for objects. Atmos for home in film, television, and music uses a technique called "spatial coding" to reduce the audio to up to a maximum of 16 concurrent "elements" or audio location clusters, that adapt to the content dynamically. In Atmos games, ISF (Intermediate Spatial format) is used, which supports 32 total active objects (using a 7.1.4 bed, 20 additional dynamic objects can be active). Each object specifies its apparent source location in the theater as a set of three-dimensional rectangular coordinates relative to the defined audio channel locations and theater boundaries.

Dolby Atmos home theaters can be built upon conventional 5.1 and 7.1 layouts. For Dolby Atmos, the nomenclature differs slightly by an additional number at the end, which represents the number of overhead or Dolby Atmos-enabled speakers: a 7.1.4 Dolby Atmos system is a conventional 7.1 layout with four overhead or Dolby Atmos-enabled speakers. The simplest Dolby Atmos setup is 3.1.2, the most complex one is 24.1.10.

Dolby Atmos content is authored using compatible digital audio workstation software (Dolby supplies a plug-in for Pro Tools and Cubase) or a suitably equipped large format audio mixing console such as AMS Neve's DFC or Harrison's MPC5.

The Dolby Atmos sound system consists of a compatible speaker system, a TV or AV media player, and an AV receiver (or preprocessor), with a Dolby Atmos object audio renderer. During playback, each theater's Dolby Atmos system renders the audio objects in real time based on the known locations of the loudspeakers present in the target theater, such that each audio object is heard as originating from its designated set of coordinates. In contrast, conventional multichannel technology essentially burns all the source audio tracks into a fixed number of channels during post-production. This forces assumptions to be made about the playback environment that may not apply to specific theater configurations.

The first-generation cinema hardware, the "Dolby Atmos Cinema Processor", supports up to 128 discrete audio tracks and up to 64 unique speaker feeds. The technology was initially created for commercial cinema applications, and was later adapted to home cinema. In addition to playing back a standard 5.1 or 7.1 mix using loudspeakers grouped into arrays, the Dolby Atmos system can also give each loudspeaker its own unique feed based on its exact location, thereby enabling many new front, surround, and even ceiling-mounted height channels for the precise panning of select sounds such as a helicopter or rain.

== Consumer implementations ==
=== Home theater and TV sets ===
In June 2014, Dolby Laboratories' hardware partners announced the introduction of Dolby Atmos technology for home theatres Following this announcement, Dolby Atmos-enabled movies became accessible through Kaleidescape's movie players. A public demonstration of Dolby Atmos in a home theater setting took place during the CEDIA Expo 2014, utilizing a Trinnov Audio Altitude 32 processor.

Several audio and video equipment manufacturers, including Creative, Denon, JBL, LG, Marantz, Onkyo, Pioneer, Samsung, Sony and Yamaha introduced products compatible with Dolby Atmos, ranging from high-end home theater projectors and audio equipments, to mid-range home-theater TV set packages. tvOS12 for the Apple TV 4K, released on September 17, 2018, added support for Dolby Atmos with Dolby Digital Plus.

Dolby Atmos-enabled speakers are available in two configurations:

1. Integrated speakers: These combine traditional front-firing speakers with Dolby Atmos-enabled up-firing speakers within a single cabinet.
2. Add-on modules: These are separate Dolby Atmos-enabled up-firing speakers designed to be placed on top of or within proximity (up to 3 feet or 0.91 meters) to existing speakers.

=== Implementation and differences from commercial implementations ===
The first movie to be released on Blu-ray with Dolby Atmos was Transformers: Age of Extinction, at least for its original English-language audio presentation. The first video game to use Dolby Atmos was Star Wars: Battlefront with a special agreement between EA and Dolby Laboratories. This game uses HDMI bit streaming from the PC to deliver Atmos audio to consumer Audio-Visual Receivers. On the Xbox One, Crackdown 3 and Gears of War 4 support Atmos.

Dolby Atmos for Music, an audio-only iteration of the format, was adopted by streaming music services Tidal (uses E-AC3) and Amazon Music in December 2019.

Sennheiser launched a new sound bar with built-in Dolby Atmos technology named AMBEO sound bar at the 2019 CES in Las Vegas. The sound bar utilizes analysis of a room's reflective characteristics to enable a single-unit 5.1.4 setup.

Dolby Atmos FlexConnect (DAFC) is a wireless home-theater technology that lets speakers be placed anywhere in a room and adjusts the sound so an immersive Atmos experience is preserved regardless of seating position. Built-in microphones calibrate the setup, and Dolby's virtualization re-renders the mix's object coordinates to the detected speaker positions, so sound can appear to come from points where no speaker is present. Dolby introduced the feature in 2023. TCL was the first to bring it to market, with its Z100 wireless speakers paired to the company's 2025 televisions. LG adopted it across its Sound Suite range, presenting the H7 as the first FlexConnect soundbar at CES 2026 and adding a seating-based feature it calls Sound Follow.In December 2025, LG extended the feature to soundbars with the Sound Suite, a modular wireless system whose H7 soundbar was the first soundbar to support Dolby Atmos FlexConnect; the H7 can be combined with M5 and M7 wireless speakers and a W7 subwoofer in a range of configurations.

On May 17, 2021, Apple Music announced the addition of spatial audio with support for Dolby Atmos and lossless audio. The feature was introduced to Apple Music users on Apple devices starting from June 7, 2021. Dolby Atmos is now fully supported on Android with Windows support coming in the future.

Streaming services like Netflix, Disney+, Vudu, Apple TV+, Amazon Prime Video and HBO Max stream movies and TV shows in Dolby Atmos. It is also used for concert films and other live entertainment streaming services, such as On Air.

The application of Atmos in home theaters differs from theaters primarily because of restricted bandwidth and a shortfall in processing power. A spatially-coded sub-stream is added to Dolby TrueHD or Dolby Digital Plus or is present as metadata in Dolby MAT 2.0, an LPCM-like format. This sub-stream is an efficient representation of the full, original object-based mix. This is not a matrix-encoded channel, but a spatially-encoded digital signal with panning metadata. Atmos in home theaters can support 24.1.10 channels and uses the spatially-encoded object audio sub-stream to mix the audio presentation to match the installed speaker configuration. There are programs from Dolby that handle 128 objects (including 118 dynamic objects and 10 beds) for macOS and Windows.

To reduce the bit rate in Dolby Atmos, nearby objects and speakers are grouped into clusters known as aggregate objects, which are then dynamically panned through a process referred to as spatial coding by Dolby. The audio from the original objects can be distributed across multiple aggregate objects to preserve the original objects' sound power and position. Filmmakers have control over the spatial resolution and the degree of clustering when using the Dolby Atmos Production Suite tools. Additionally, Dolby Digital Plus has been updated to include Atmos extensions.

=== Headphones ===
Dolby Atmos also has headphone implementations for PCs, the Xbox One, the Xbox Series X/S, and mobile phones. They work by using audio processing algorithms to convert the Atmos object metadata into a binaural 360° output using the usual two headphone speakers. This technique is an improvement on the previous Dolby Headphone technology, allowing infinite channels of sound to be processed into a virtual surround experience.

With the release of third-generation AirPods in October 2021, Apple added support for Dolby Atmos, branded Spatial Audio, to all AirPods (third-generation and newer), AirPods Pro, AirPods Max, and most headphones marketed under the Beats brand.

=== PC computers ===
Windows 10 version 1703 ("Creators Update") added platform-level support for spatial sound processing, including Windows Sonic for Headphones and Dolby Atmos for Headphones. Dolby Atmos for headphones requires a license to function which can be purchased or redeemed inside the Dolby Access app. Some branded headphones designed explicitly to deliver better audio quality exist, but users can use their normal headphones or earphones so long as the decoding device uses Atmos, or the audio track itself has been previously downmixed. For some high-end model PCs, the OEM licensed Dolby Atmos features and fused Dolby related license keys into their drivers; the Dolby related audio drivers are needed to be installed in Windows.

Since Windows 11, version 24H2, Microsoft no longer bundle Dolby Digital Plus, Dolby TrueHD and Dolby Atmos decoders. The Dolby Access app can be downloaded from Microsoft Store; the free app version includes Dolby decoders and upmixers for home theater devices, but premium features such as virtual surround for headphones or built-in speakers requires a paid or OEM license.

=== Smartphones ===
Dolby Atmos has smartphone implementations for devices including but not limited to the iPhone XS/XR and later (when running iOS 13 or later) and almost all Samsung smartphones and tablets released after the Samsung Galaxy S9. Other smartphones and tablets with Dolby Atmos include the Razer Phone and Razer Phone 2, the ZTE Axon 7, Sony Xperia 1, Lenovo K4 Note, Lenovo Vibe K5 Note, Lenovo K8 Note, Huawei P20, Huawei P30, Poco F3, Realme XT, Realme X2 Pro, Realme 6 Pro, Realme X7 Max, Realme Pad, Nokia 6, OnePlus 7, OnePlus 7T, OnePlus 8 and OnePlus 8T, and Moto G8, Moto G32, and Redmi Note 13 Pro. Implementations in phone use both the binaural headphone technology and the dual loudspeaker virtual surround sound implementation, similar to that used in Dolby Atmos TVs and soundbars. For smartphones that support Dolby Atmos, the Dolby related license keys and audio drivers must be included in their Board Support Package.

iPhone (since iPhone 11) can support Dolby Atmos decoding.

=== Automobiles ===
NIO ET7 comes standard with Dolby Atmos. On November 16, 2021, NIO announced that Dolby Atmos will be standardized on all NIO ET7s, the smart flagship electric sedan of the company, combined with a 7.1.4 immersive sound system.

Dolby's first implementation of Atmos in an automobile was the Lucid Air sedan from Lucid Motors.

Other brands that have since cars equipped with Dolby Atmos include Genesis, Li Auto, Lotus, Mercedes, Polestar, Rivian, Volvo, Cadillac, Xiaomi, Audi, Hyundai, and Mahindra.

== Compatibility ==
Dolby Atmos is adaptable and can be played back on various speaker setups. As well, many audio products provide additional support for Dolby Atmos.

The technology has been licensed to other brands by Dolby. Since its launch, the Dolby Atmos format has been used by/affiliated with several companies in consumer technology as well as major film productions. This has added to the overall availability of content for Dolby Atmos users.

== See also ==
- Category:Dolby Atmos albums
- A3D, a similar, HRTF-based 3D surround sound system
- Ambisonics, a similar spatial sound encoding technique. Nowadays used for some games and VR Audio
- Auro-3D, a similar, completely channel-based 3D surround sound system
- DTS:X, a competing fully object-based system
- MPEG-H 3D Audio
- Sound Blaster X-Fi, a competing surround sound "audio holography" system for headphones tuned to ear shape.
- EAX, Creative, real-time multi-object spatial audio rendering implementation
- Nokia OZO, a similar spatial sound technique, specifically used for a 360 audio experience in communication.
