= Pete Lau =

CEO of OnePlus

- 刘作虎
- Born: 5 May 1975 (age 51); Hanchuan, Hubei, China
- Education: Zhejiang University (BA)
- Occupations: Co-founder and CEO of OnePlus

Pete Lau (born 5 May 1975), or Liu Zuohu (Chinese: 刘作虎; pinyin: Liú Zuòhǔ; Jyutping: Lau^{4} Zok^{3}fu^{2}), is a Chinese entrepreneur. He is the co-founder and the chief executive officer of Chinese smartphone maker OnePlus. Also currently, he serves as Chief Product Officer (CPO) at his former company Oppo in China.

== Career in Oppo ==
Lau started working in Oppo as a hardware engineer. He later became the director of Oppo's Blu-ray division. Lau's attention for detail became famous in tech circles during that time when he smashed a Blu-ray player's logic board to express his disappointment about the circuitry design. He then became head of marketing before finally getting assigned as the Vice President. As the Vice President, he was instrumental in bringing CyanogenMod, an Android-based operating system, to Oppo N1 smartphone. He resigned from Oppo in November 2013 after working in the company for over a decade.

== OnePlus ==
In December 2013, Lau and Carl Pei launched their own company, OnePlus, with the aim of creating "a more beautiful and higher quality product." At the time of its founding, OnePlus had only 6 employees. Cutting costs was a priority for the company early on, so Lau opted to sell his company's first product exclusively online, taking inspiration from market models of the Nexus line and Oppo. He chose Cyanogen OS as the device's operating system and extended his ties with Stefanie Jane (née Kondik) of Cyanogen Inc., whom he became acquainted with during his time at Oppo.

Since OnePlus didn't have a manufacturing facility, Lau had the device manufactured in the facilities of his former company, Oppo. The device named OnePlus One was announced officially in April 2014 and became available for online order in June 2014. OnePlus One received positive reviews from the tech community, praising the phone's specifications, performance, design and aggressive pricing. The device's attention to detail, an aspect that can be attributed to Lau, was praised by several tech experts. Due to limited product supply, the phone was initially available for purchase through an invite-only system.

The phone's pricing was discussed widely in tech media. The 16 GB version of the phone cost USD 299 while the 64 GB version cost USD 349, almost half the price of other flagship devices at that time with similar specifications. Lau attributed the low prices to the lack of marketing costs, the online marketing strategy, and low profit margins. The strategy was labelled as brave and risky for a new company by tech website Tech Radar. Another tech site, Phone Arena, commented that "if OnePlus can succeed selling its smartphone without television advertising, it will have done something that the major manufacturers could never accomplish."

By December 2014, nearly 1 million phones were sold. OnePlus announced a new OS, OxygenOS, for their smartphones when YU Televentures, a subsidiary of Micromax, announced that they alone had permission for the use of Cyanogen OS in India.

In January 2026, the Shilin District Prosecutors Office in Taiwan indicted two Taiwanese executives and issued an arrest warrant for Lau over allegations that OnePlus illegally employed Taiwanese engineers. Prosecutors alleged that OnePlus recruited more than 70 engineers in Taiwan without government approval, in violation of Taiwan’s Cross-Strait Act, which regulates employment by mainland Chinese companies.
