= OnePlus 9 =

Android-based smartphone series by OnePlus

OnePlus 9 OnePlus 9 Pro
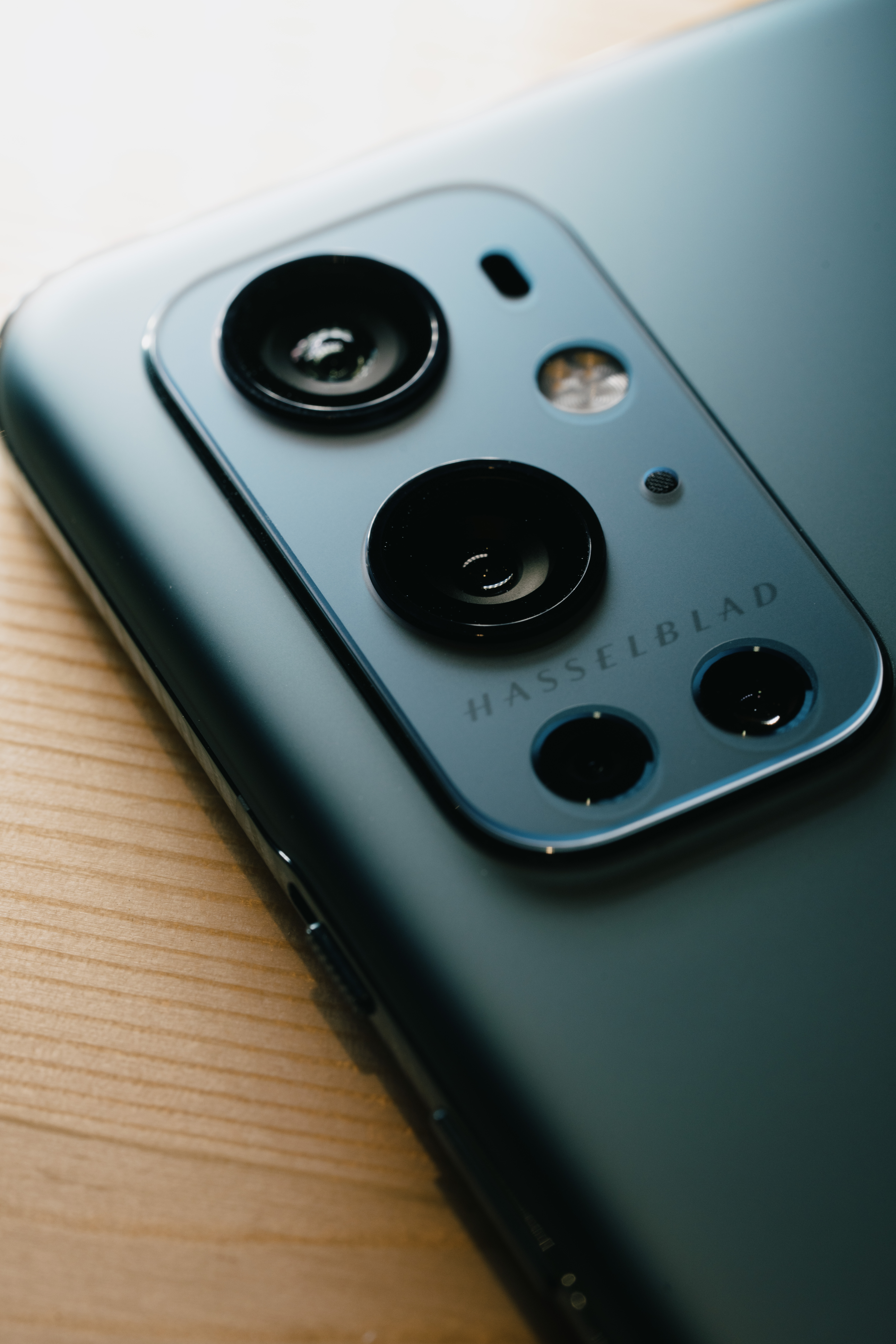
- A close-up of OnePlus 9 Pro camera
- Manufacturer: OnePlus
- Type: Smartphone
- First released: 26 March 2021; 5 years ago
- Availability by region: Europe: 31 March 2021; 5 years ago; North America: 2 April 2021; 5 years ago; Asia: 31 March 2021; 5 years ago
- Predecessor: OnePlus 8T; OnePlus 8 Pro
- Successor: OnePlus 10 Pro
- Related: Oppo Find X3
- Form factor: Slate
- Dimensions: 9 (EU/NA): 160 mm (6.3 in) H 74.2 mm (2.92 in) W 8.7 mm (0.34 in) D 9 (IN/CA): 160 mm (6.3 in) H 73.9 mm (2.91 in) W 8.1 mm (0.32 in) D 9 Pro: 163.2 mm (6.43 in) H 73.6 mm (2.90 in) W 8.7 mm (0.34 in) D
- Weight: 9 (EU/NA): 192 g (6.8 oz); 9 (IN/CA): 183 g (6.5 oz); 9 Pro: 197 g (6.9 oz)
- Operating system: Android 11 with OxygenOS 11 (upgradable to Android 14 with Oxygen OS 14); China: Android 11 with ColorOS 11
- System-on-chip: Qualcomm Snapdragon 888
- CPU: Octa-core (1x2.84 GHz Kryo 680 & 3x2.42 GHz Kryo 680 & 4x1.80 GHz Kryo 680)
- GPU: Adreno 660
- Memory: 8 or 12 GB
- Storage: 128 or 256 GB UFS 3.1
- Removable storage: None
- Battery: 4500 mAh lithium polymer
- Charging: All: 65 W fast charging; 9 (EU/NA): 15 W fast wireless charging; 9 Pro: 50 W fast wireless charging
- Rear camera: 48 MP, f/1.8, 23mm (wide), 1/1.43", 1.12 μm: 9: Sony Exmor IMX689 (omnidirectional PDAF); 9 Pro: Sony Exmor IMX789 (omnidirectional PDAF, Laser AF & OIS); 50 MP, f/2.2, 14mm (ultrawide), 1/1.56", 1.0 μm; 2 MP, f/2.4 (depth); Hasselblad optics, dual-LED flash, HDR, panorama; Video: 8K@30 fps, 4K@30/60/120 fps, (Note: 4K@120 fps is limited to the 9 Pro) 1080p@30/60/240 fps, Auto HDR, gyro-EIS; 9 Pro: In addition to above: 8 MP, f/2.4, 77mm (telephoto), 1.0 μm, PDAF, OIS, 3.3x optical zoom
- Front camera: 16 MP, f/2.4, (wide), 1/3.06", 1.0 μm
- Display: Fluid AMOLED capacitive touchscreen with HDR10+ support and 120 Hz refresh rate: 9: 6.55 in (166 mm) 2400 × 1080 1080p, (402 ppi with 20:9 aspect ratio), 16M colors; 9 Pro: 6.7 in (170 mm) 3216 × 1440 1440p, (525 ppi with 20:9 aspect ratio), 1B colors
- Sound: Loudspeaker (stereo)
- Data inputs: USB-C 3.1, Fingerprint (under display, optical), accelerometer, gyro, proximity, compass, color spectrum, barometer, dual-band GNSS (GPS/GLONASS/BeiDou/Galileo)
- Water resistance: IP68 (9 Pro only)
- Website: www.oneplus.com/9; www.oneplus.com/9-pro

The OnePlus 9 and OnePlus 9 Pro are Android-based smartphones manufactured by OnePlus, unveiled on March 23, 2021. The phones feature upgraded cameras developed in partnership with Hasselblad.

== Specifications ==
=== Hardware ===
Both the OnePlus 9 and 9 Pro use the Snapdragon 888 processor with the Adreno 660 GPU, with either 128 or 256 GB of non-expandable UFS 3.1 storage. Both have 8 GB or 12 GB of LPDDR5 RAM. Both have stereo speakers with active noise cancellation and no audio jack, similar to the previous generation OnePlus 8/8Pro and OnePlus 8T.

==== Design ====
The OnePlus 9 and 9 Pro have similar designs to the previous generation OnePlus 8 and 8 Pro, with Gorilla Glass 5 on the front and back, and a "hole punch"-style camera in the upper left-hand corner. The 9's screen is flat with a plastic frame and a 2.5D edge, while the 9 Pro's screen is curved with an aluminum frame. Only the 9 Pro has an official IP Code (IP68); the regular OnePlus 9 is claimed by OnePlus to have water resistance, but has no official IP certification. The OnePlus 9 is available in three colors: Winter Mist, Arctic Sky, and Astral Black. The OnePlus 9 Pro is available in three different colors: Morning Mist, Pine Green, and Stellar Black.

==== Display ====
Both the OnePlus 9 and 9 Pro have an AMOLED HDR10+ screen with a 120 Hz refresh rate, with the 9 Pro featuring an adaptive refresh rate (meaning that the refresh rate is adjusted based on task) as it uses an LTPO backplane. The OnePlus 9 has a 6.55 inch FHD+ display and a pixel density of 402 ppi, while the 9 Pro has a 6.7 inch QHD+ display and a pixel density of 525 ppi. The 9 Pro has 10-bit color depth, which allows it to display up to 1 billion colors, like its predecessor.

Both have an in-display optical fingerprint scanner and facial recognition as biometric options. The fingerprint sensor is placed lower than in the OnePlus 8 series.

==== Camera ====
The OnePlus 9 and 9 Pro both feature upgraded camera systems from their previous generations. The main upgrade is in the optics and color processing, which were co-developed with Hasselblad, specifically in the ultra-wide camera. Both phones now feature the same ultra-wide cameras. The wide sensor is a 1/1.43" Sony IMX789 on the OnePlus 9 Pro and an IMX689 on the OnePlus 9 (as in the previous generation OnePlus 8 Pro) and the ultra-wide sensor is a 1/1.56" Sony IMX766.

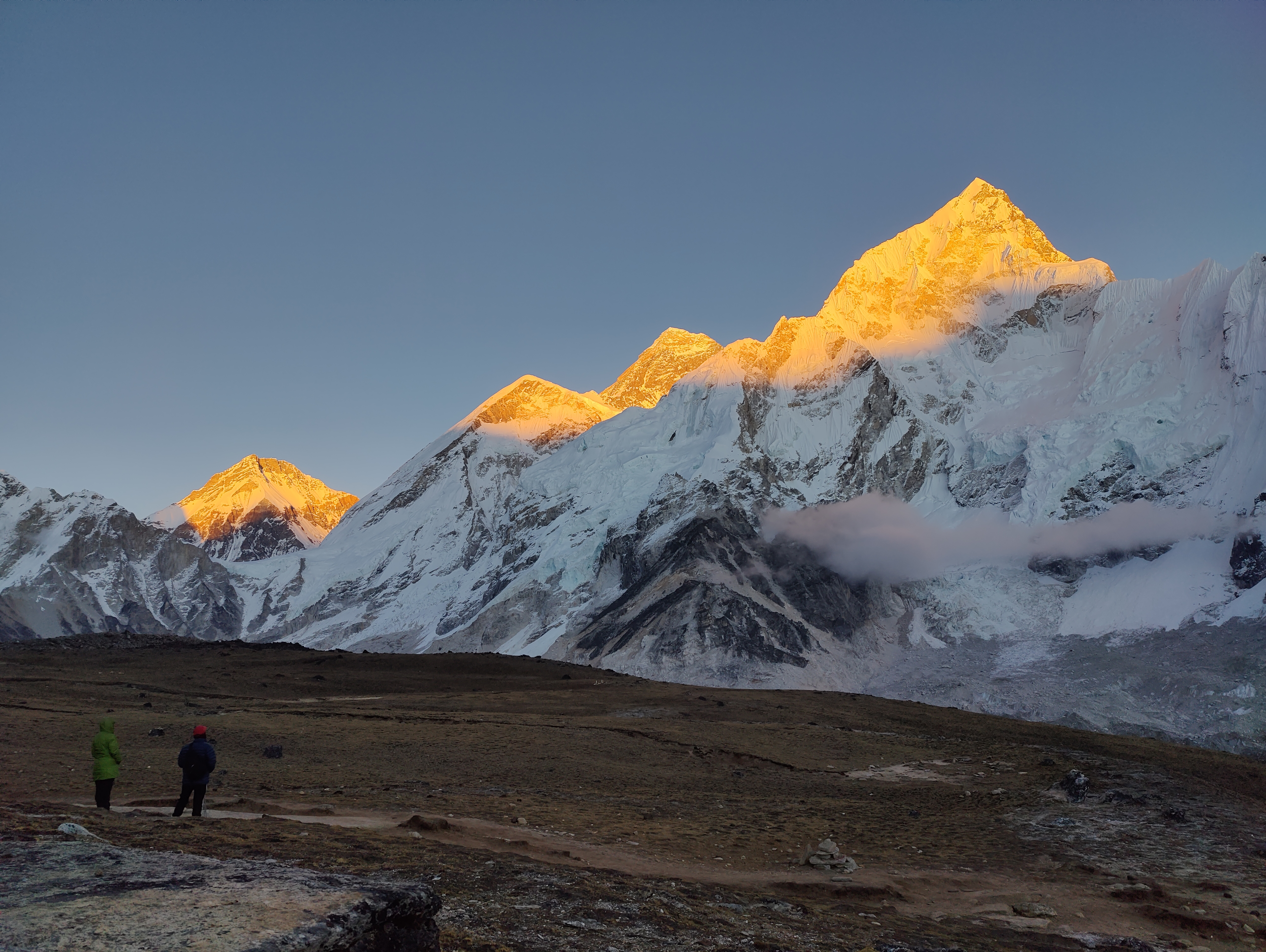
Golden Everest taken from Kalapaththar, 5450m, -20 °C, 1+ 9Pro main camera

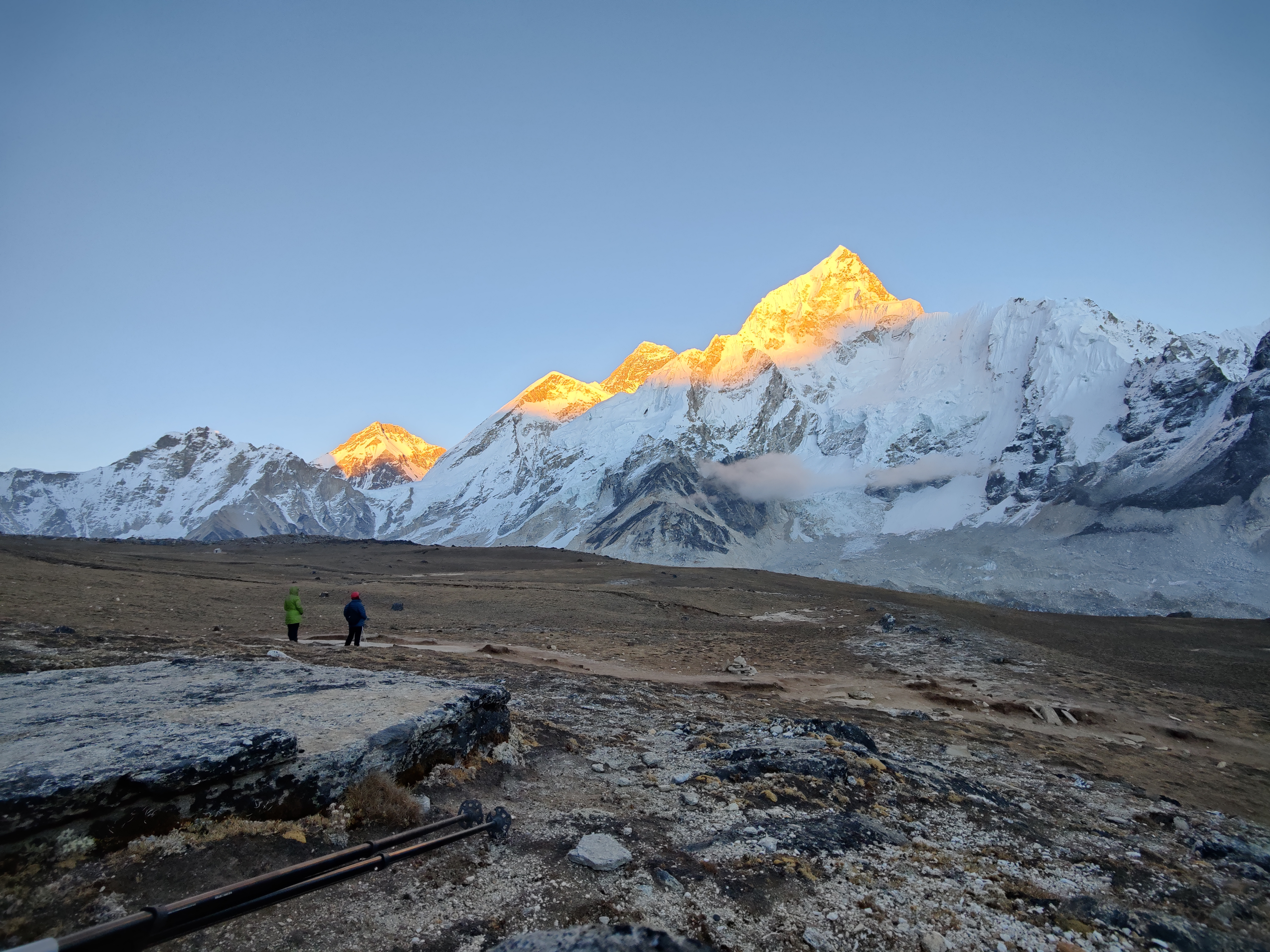
Golden Everest (centre back) and Nuptse (right), shot from Kalapaththar, 5450m, -20 °C, 1+ 9Pro wide angle lens

The OnePlus 9 Pro features an additional 77 mm, 8 MP, f/2.44 telephoto camera that uses the same sensor as the previous generation OnePlus 8 Pro.

==== Battery ====
Both phones feature a 4500 mAh lithium polymer battery. This is an increase from the regular OnePlus 8, and a slight decrease from the 8 Pro. Both feature 65 W fast charging, termed "Warp Charge 65T", with the included USB-C power brick. The regular OnePlus 9 now features 15 W fast wireless charging, which in the previous series was only included with the 8 Pro, though the feature is only available in certain regions. The 9 Pro now features 50 W fast wireless charging with the purchase of the official OnePlus-branded 50 W wireless charger. This is an increase from 30 W fast wireless charging in the previous generation.

=== Software ===
Both phones shipped originally with OxygenOS 11, based on Android 11. Since then, both phones have been updated to ColorOS 13, based on Android 13, and received Android updates up to Android 14.

== Reception ==
=== Performance throttling controversy ===
An investigation by AnandTech revealed on July 6, 2021, that the OnePlus 9 and 9 Pro throttle the performance of popular apps by limiting them to the processor's slower cores. As a result, benchmarks in apps such as Google Chrome performed up to 85% slower than competing phones that use the same Snapdragon 888 processor, such as the Samsung Galaxy S21 Ultra and Asus Zenfone 8. News website Android Authority then performed their own tests, and found that both devices perform approximately 74% worse in Chrome benchmarks than the predecessor OnePlus 8. When running the same benchmark in the Microsoft Edge web browser, which is not throttled, the 9 Pro outperformed the OnePlus 8's Chrome result by about 7%. The next day, OnePlus admitted in a statement to multiple news outlets that it was throttling the performance of as many as 300 popular apps, claiming the decision was made after complaints from users about battery life and overheating issues with the devices.

Multiple outlets criticised OnePlus for introducing the throttling feature without informing device owners. The day after the AnandTech report, performance benchmarking app Geekbench removed the OnePlus 9 and 9 Pro from its website, calling it "benchmark manipulation".

== Notes ==
Preceded by OnePlus 8T & 8 Pro	OnePlus 9; 2021	Succeeded by OnePlus 10 Pro
