= OnePlus 7T =

2019 Android-based smartphones produced by OnePlus

OnePlus 7T OnePlus 7T Pro
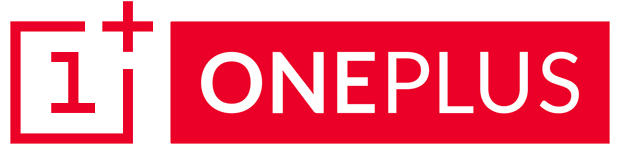
- Brand: OnePlus
- Manufacturer: OnePlus
- Type: Smartphone (7T); Phablet (7T Pro)
- First released: 7T: September 28, 2019; 7 years ago (India); October 10, 2019; 7 years ago (United Kingdom); October 18, 2019; 7 years ago (United States); 7T Pro: October 17, 2019; 7 years ago; McLaren Edition: November 5, 2019; 6 years ago
- Discontinued: January 7, 2023; 3 years ago
- Predecessor: OnePlus 7
- Successor: OnePlus 8
- Compatible networks: 2G, 3G, and 4G; 5G (7T Pro 5G McLaren Edition)
- Form factor: Slate
- Dimensions: 160.9 mm × 74.4 mm × 8.1 mm (6.33 in × 2.93 in × 0.32 in) (7T); 162.6 mm × 75.9 mm × 8.8 mm (6.40 in × 2.99 in × 0.35 in) (7T Pro)
- Weight: 190 g (6.7 oz) (7T); 206 g (7.3 oz) (7T Pro)
- Operating system: OxygenOS (based on Android 10) upgradable to OxygenOS 12 (Android 12)
- System-on-chip: Qualcomm Snapdragon 855+
- CPU: Octa-core (1x2.96 GHz Kryo 485 & 3x2.42 GHz Kryo 485 & 4x1.80 GHz Kryo 485)
- GPU: Qualcomm Adreno 640
- Memory: 8 GB LPDDR4X RAM; 12 GB LPDDR4X RAM (McLaren Edition)
- Storage: 128 GB or 256 GB UFS 3.0 (7T); 256 GB UFS 3.0 (7T Pro)
- Battery: 3800 mAh (7T); 4085 mAh (7T Pro); Warp Charge technology
- Rear camera: 7T: 48 MP, f/1.6, 1/2", 0.8 μm + 16 MP, f/2.2, 17 mm (Ultrawide) + 12 MP, f/2.2, 51 mm (Telephoto with 2x optical zoom); 7T Pro: 48 MP, f/1.6, 1/2", 0.8 μm + 16 MP, f/2.2, 13 mm (Ultrawide) + 8 MP, f/2.4, 1.0 μm (Telephoto with 3x optical zoom); Both: Laser/PDAF, OIS, Dual-LED flash 4K@30/60 fps, 1080p@30/60/240 fps, 720p@960 fps, Auto HDR, gyro-EIS
- Front camera: 16 MP, f/2.0, 25 mm, 1/3.1", 1.0 μm 1080p@30 fps, gyro-EIS
- Display: 7T: 6.55 in (16.6 cm) 2400×1080 1080p Fluid AMOLED capacitive touchscreen, (401 ppi with 20:9 aspect ratio); 7T Pro: 6.67 in (16.9 cm) 3120×1440 1440p Fluid AMOLED capacitive touchscreen, (516 ppi with 19.5:9 aspect ratio), Both: DCI-P3, HDR10+, 90 Hz refresh rate
- Sound: Dolby Atmos Dual stereo speakers with active noise cancellation
- Connectivity: Bluetooth 5.0; Wi-Fi a/b/g/n/ac; 3G/LTE
- Data inputs: Fingerprint scanner (in-screen); Accelerometer; gyroscope; proximity sensor; electronic compass; Dual-band GNSS (GPS/GLONASS/BeiDou/Galileo) with SBAS
- Codename: hotdog (7T Pro), hotdogg (7T Pro McLaren), hotdogb (7T)
- Website: oneplus.com/7t

The OnePlus 7T and 7T Pro are Android-based smartphones manufactured by OnePlus. The 7T was unveiled on 26 September 2019, and the 7T Pro was unveiled on 10 October 2019. The McLaren edition from the 6T returns on the 7T Pro. Both have minor upgrades as with previous T phones, such as new software, upgraded cameras and a faster chipset.

== Specifications ==
=== Design ===
The 7T and 7T Pro's designs are similar to their predecessors, with an anodized aluminum frame and Gorilla Glass on both the front and back. The 7T has a near-full screen display with an 86.5% screen-to-body ratio; a small notch at the top of the phone houses the front camera. The camera module on the rear is now circular, with the flash located inside the lens. The 7T Pro is nearly identical to the 7 Pro externally with an 88.1% screen-to-body ratio. The 7T is available in Frosted Silver and Glacial Blue, both of which have a matte finish, and the 7T Pro is available in Haze Blue, which is a lighter shade than the 7 Pro's Nebula Blue.

=== Hardware ===
Internally, both the 7T and 7T Pro use the Snapdragon 855+ processor with the Adreno 640 GPU, both of which have a higher clock speed than the chipset used in the 7 and 7 Pro. They are available with either 128 or 256 GB of non-expandable UFS 3.0 storage and 8 GB of LPDDR4X RAM. A 6.55-inch (166.4mm) 1080p (1080 × 2400) AMOLED display is used with a wider 20:9 aspect ratio, while retaining the 90 Hz refresh rate of the 7 Pro. The 7T Pro's display remains the same, with a curved 6.67-inch (169.4mm) 19.5:9 1440p (1440 × 3120) 90 Hz AMOLED. Both have stereo speakers with active noise cancellation, although the audio jack is still omitted. The 7T uses a 3800 mAh battery, while the 7T Pro uses a 4085 mAh battery which is marginally larger than the 7 Pro's. Power and data connections are provided through the USB-C port; fast charging is supported at 30W. Warp Charge 30T is now supported, which is 23% faster than Warp Charge 30 which was used on the 7 Pro. Biometric options include an optical (under-screen) fingerprint sensor and facial recognition.

==== Camera ====
A 16 MP f/2.0 sensor is used for the front camera, while the rear has an upgraded triple camera setup. The 7T Pro uses a mechanized pop-up camera like on the 7 Pro. The array on both phones consists of a primary lens, a telephoto (zoom) lens, and an ultrawide lens. The primary wide lens has a 48 MP sensor, while a 16 MP sensor is used for the ultrawide lens and a 12 MP sensor is used for the telephoto lens. The 7T Pro's camera hardware is unchanged, with a 48 MP lens, a 16 MP ultrawide lens and an 8 MP telephoto lens, but it can now record ultra slow-motion 720p video at 960 fps (the 7T also receives the same upgraded slow-motion capabilities) and the laser autofocus has been relocated to the left of the camera. While the 7T's telephoto lens benefits from an increase in resolution and a wider f/2.2 aperture, it lacks the 7T Pro's optical image stabilization and laser autofocus and only has 2x optical zoom compared to the 7T Pro's 3x optical zoom, resulting in a smaller 51 mm focal length opposed to the 7T Pro's 78 mm focal length. The ultrawide lens has also been upgraded; it is 17 mm compared to 13 mm on the 7T Pro. Additionally, both phones benefit from a new macro mode which allows users to take photos from as close as 2.5 cm away from the subject. A new Hybrid Image Stabilization for video is also available, and Portrait Mode and Night Scape can now be used on the wide and ultrawide lenses respectively.

=== Software ===
The 7T and 7T Pro run on OxygenOS 12, which is based on Android 12.

=== Network compatibility ===
| Model | GSM Bands | CDMA Bands | UMTS Bands | LTE Bands |
|---|---|---|---|---|
| 7T | 850 / 900 / 1800 / 1900 MHz | BC0, BC1 | 1, 2, 4, 5, 8, 9, 19 | FDD: 1, 2, 3, 4, 5, 7, 8, 12, 13, 17, 18, 19, 20, 25, 26, 28, 29, 30, 32, 66, 71 TDD: 34, 38, 39, 40, 41, 46, 48 |
| 7T Pro | 850 / 900 / 1800 / 1900 MHz | BC0, BC1 | 1, 2, 4, 5, 8, 9, 19 | FDD: 1, 2, 3, 4, 5, 7, 8, 12, 13, 17, 18, 19, 20, 25, 26, 28, 29, 32, 66 TDD: 34, 38, 39, 40, 41 |

The OnePlus 7T Pro will only be available in Europe, India, China and Hong Kong.

=== Variants ===
Both the OnePlus 7T and OnePlus 7T Pro have several variants. The differences are usually with the supported bands.

| Model | Variant | Region |
|---|---|---|
| OnePlus 7T | HD1900 | China / HongKong |
| OnePlus 7T | HD1901 | India |
| OnePlus 7T | HD1903 | Europe |
| OnePlus 7T | HD1905 | North America |
| OnePlus 7T | HD1907 | T-Mobile |
| Model | Variant | Region |
| OnePlus 7T Pro | HD1910 | China / HongKong |
| OnePlus 7T Pro | HD1911 | India |
| OnePlus 7T Pro | HD1913 | Europe |
| Model | Variant | Region |
| OnePlus 7T Pro 5G | HD1925 | T-Mobile |

== McLaren edition ==
The McLaren edition is a variant of the 7T Pro and has 12 GB of RAM. The back of the phone has a wood-like finish with orange accents, inspired by the McLaren Speedtail. The software includes a unique theme, while a carbon fiber/alcantara case is included with the phone. A 5G variant was announced later, exclusive to T-Mobile.

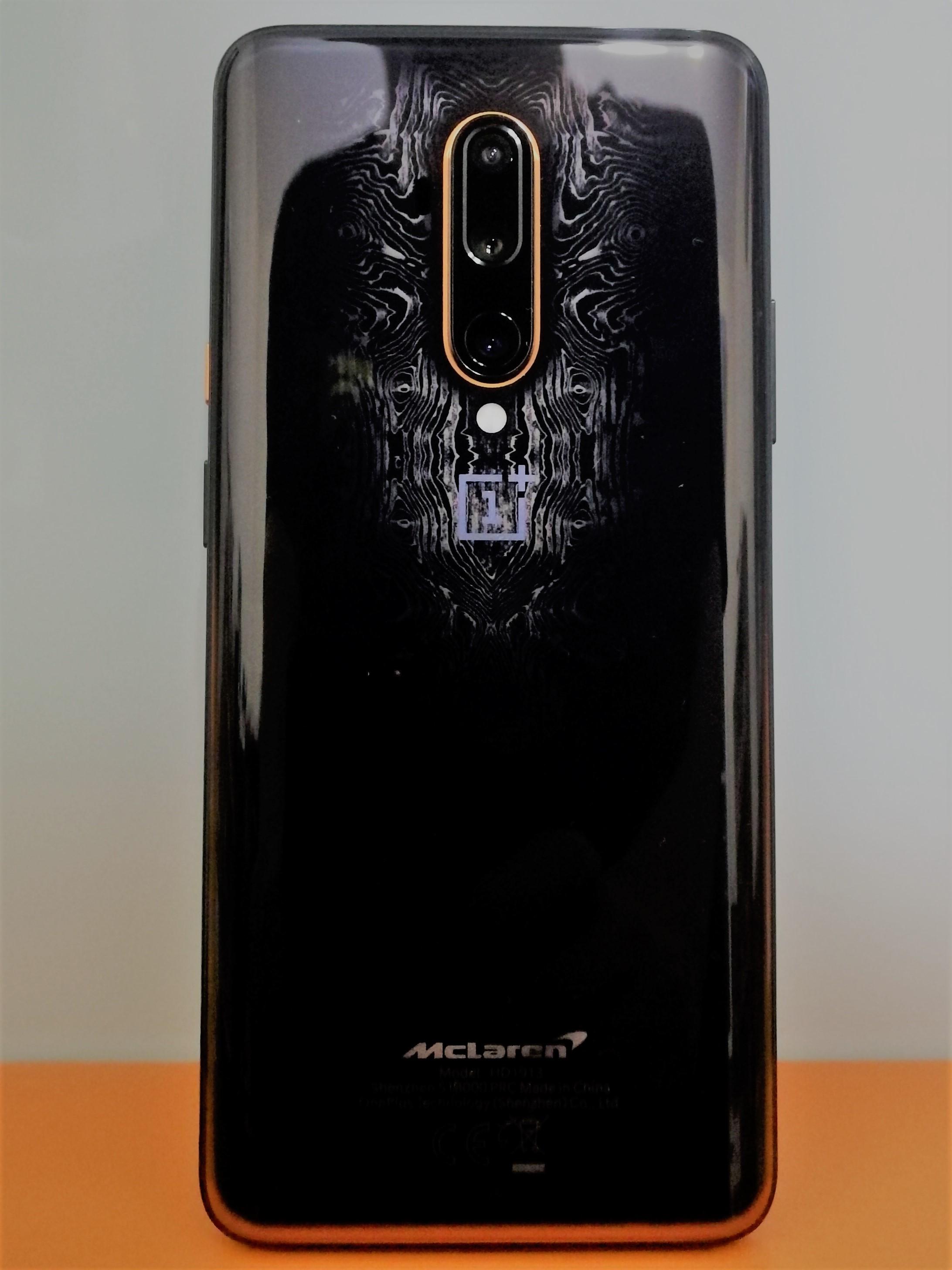

== Reception ==
The OnePlus 7T received positive reviews overall, with praise being directed at the display, performance, cameras and software. Dan Seifert of The Verge remarked that the camera experience remained largely the same as on the 7 Pro and battery life was just average, and Andy Boxall of Digital Trends noted that the display seemed muted even when the Vivid color mode was selected. The lack of water resistance, wireless charging and a MicroSD card slot were also seen as downsides. The 7T Pro was reviewed favorably as well.

The OnePlus 7T Pro won the best smartphone of 2019 title at the GSMA awards.

| Preceded by OnePlus 7 & 7 Pro | OnePlus 7T & 7T Pro; 2019 | Succeeded by OnePlus 8 & 8 Pro |
