= OnePlus 8T =

Android-based smartphone manufactured by OnePlus

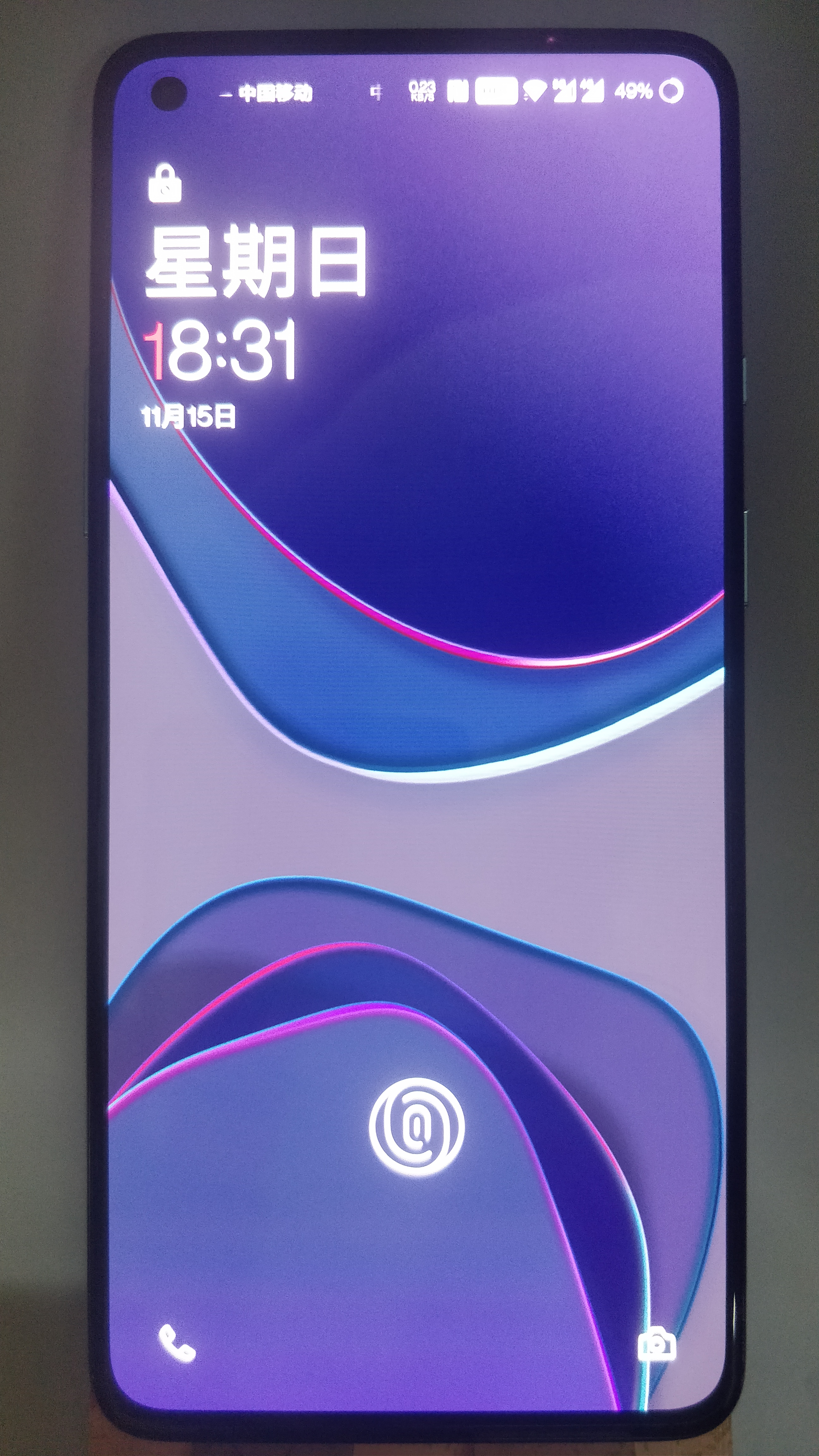
- Brand: OnePlus
- Manufacturer: OnePlus
- Type: Phablet
- First released: 16 October 2020; 6 years ago
- Availability by region: India: 17 October 2020; 6 years ago; Europe and China: 20 October 2020; 6 years ago; United States: 23 October 2020; 6 years ago
- Predecessor: OnePlus 8
- Successor: OnePlus 9
- Form factor: Slate
- Dimensions: 160.7 mm (6.33 in) H 74.1 mm (2.92 in) W 8.4 mm (0.33 in) D
- Weight: 188 g (6.6 oz)
- Operating system: Original: OxygenOS 11 (based on Android 11); Current: OxygenOS 14 (based on Android 14)
- System-on-chip: Qualcomm Snapdragon 865
- CPU: Octa-core (1x2.84 GHz Kryo 585 & 3x2.42 GHz Kryo 585 & 4x1.80 GHz Kryo 585)
- GPU: Adreno 650
- Memory: 8 or 12 GB RAM LPDDR4X
- Storage: 128 or 256 GB UFS 3.1
- Battery: 4500 mAh
- Charging: Warp Charge 65 (65 W)
- Rear camera: 48 MP, f/1.78, 25 mm, 1/2", 0.8 μm (wide) + 16 MP, f/2.2, 14 mm (ultrawide) + 5 MP, f/2.4, 1.75 μm (macro) + 2 MP, f/2.4 (monochrome), PDAF, OIS, gyro-EIS, dual-LED flash, Auto HDR, 4K@30/60 fps, 1080p@30/60/240 fps, 720p@480 fps
- Front camera: 16 MP, f/2.45, 1/3", 1.0 μm 1080p@30 fps, Auto-HDR, gyro-EIS
- Display: 6.55 in (166 mm) 2400 × 1080 1080p Fluid AMOLED capacitive touchscreen with HDR10+ support, (402 ppi with 20:9 aspect ratio), 120 Hz refresh rate, 16 million colors
- Sound: Dolby Atmos Dual stereo speakers with active noise cancellation
- Connectivity: Bluetooth 5.1; Wi-Fi a/b/g/n/ac/6
- Data inputs: Fingerprint scanner (optical); Accelerometer; gyroscope; proximity sensor; electronic compass; Dual-band GNSS (GPS/GLONASS/BeiDou/Galileo)
- Codename: kebab
- Website: www.oneplus.com/8t

The OnePlus 8T is an Android-based smartphone designed and marketed by OnePlus. It is the sixteenth phone released by OnePlus, and was announced on 14 October 2020, and released on 16 October 2020. A variant of this phone is sold by T-Mobile US as the OnePlus 8T+.

== Specifications ==
=== Design ===
The OnePlus 8T is similar to the OnePlus 8 externally, with an anodized aluminum frame and Gorilla Glass 5 panels. The display has a circular cutout for the front-facing camera. However, it is differentiated by its display glass, which is flat rather than curved. The back panel has a different camera module with a raised rectangular lens, split into two columns. The first contains three of the cameras, while the second contains the depth sensor, color temperature sensor and dual-LED flash. It is available in two finishes, Aquamarine Green (glossy) and Lunar Silver (matte).

=== Hardware ===
The OnePlus 8T is powered by the Snapdragon 865 5G processor with the Adreno 650 GPU, accompanied by 128 or 256 GB of non-expandable UFS 3.1 storage and 8 or 12 GB of LPDDR4X RAM. It has stereo speakers with active noise cancellation, but no audio jack. Biometric options include an optical (in-display) fingerprint scanner and facial recognition.

The display is a 6.55-inch 1080p AMOLED with a 20:9 aspect ratio and HDR10+ support, identical to the 8 aside from the refresh rate, which has been increased from 90 Hz to 120 Hz. The battery capacity is slightly larger than the 8 at 4500 mAh. Fast-charging is supported at up to 65 W via Warp Charge 65 compared to the 8's Warp Charge 30. This is enabled by a dual-cell design, with the battery split into two 2250 mAh cells. Like the OnePlus 8, wireless charging is not supported.

The standard unlocked 8T supports two physical SIM cards, and lacks an IP rating, but it has seals for making the phone waterproof. The T-Mobile US variant has only one SIM slot, but has an IP68 rating.

==== Camera ====
The OnePlus 8T includes a quad camera array, consisting of a 48 MP wide sensor, a 16 MP ultrawide sensor, a 5 MP macro sensor and a 2 MP monochrome sensor. Most of the camera hardware is unchanged from the 8, with the Sony IMX586 carried over for the wide sensor. The front-facing camera has a 16 MP sensor.

=== Software ===
The OnePlus 8T runs on OxygenOS 11, which is based on Android 11. It is the first non-Google phone to ship with Android 11 pre-installed.

=== Variants ===
OnePlus 8T have several variants. The differences are usually with the supported bands and pricing.

Model	Variant	Region
OnePlus 8T	KB2000	China
OnePlus 8T	KB2001	India
OnePlus 8T	KB2003	Europe
OnePlus 8T	KB2005	International
OnePlus 8T	KB2007	T-Mobile

== Reception ==
The OnePlus 8T received positive reviews, receiving an 8.6/10 from CNET, an 8/10 from The Verge, an 8.4/10 from Engadget, and a 3.5/5 from Digital Trends. The phone was praised for its performance, display, software, battery life, and fast 65W charging speeds. However, its camera, while nonetheless commended, was criticized as lacking when compared to other flagship phones, with the macro and monochrome lenses being considered superfluous or gimmicky. The absence of an IP rating (except in phones sold by T-Mobile US) and wireless charging were additionally seen as drawbacks.

Reviewers generally felt the OnePlus 8T to be an incremental improvement from the OnePlus 8. The high-end model with 12 GB RAM and 256 GB UFS was criticized as being overpriced; being the only model sold in the US in contrast to other countries, some suggested that potential buyers there should consider other competing phones or those from OnePlus.

Preceded by OnePlus 8	OnePlus 8T; 2020	Succeeded by OnePlus 9
