= OnePlus 6T =

2018 Android-based smartphone produced by OnePlus

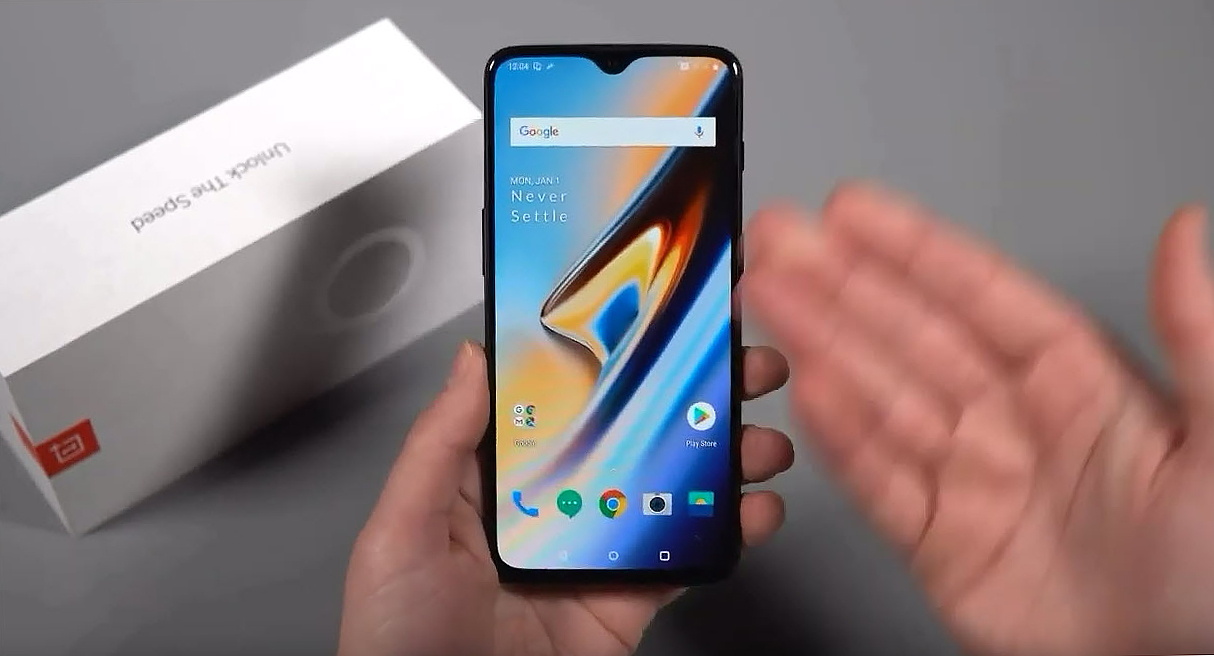
- Brand: OnePlus
- Manufacturer: OnePlus
- Type: Smartphone
- First released: 6 November 2018; 7 years ago
- Predecessor: OnePlus 6
- Successor: OnePlus 7 OnePlus 7 Pro
- Compatible networks: 2G, 3G and 4G
- Form factor: Slate
- Dimensions: 157.5 mm (6.20 in) H 74.8 mm (2.94 in) W 8.2 mm (0.32 in) D
- Weight: 6.5 oz (185 g)
- Operating system: OxygenOS (based on Android Pie, upgradable to Android 11)
- System-on-chip: Qualcomm Snapdragon 845
- CPU: Octa-core (4×2.8 GHz + 4×1.8 GHz) Kryo
- GPU: Adreno 630
- Memory: 6, 8 or 10 (McLaren Edition) GB LPDDR4X RAM
- Storage: 128 or 256 GB UFS 2.1
- Battery: 3700 mAh Li-Ion with Dash Charge technology
- Rear camera: 16 MP Sony Exmor IMX519 (f/1.7, OIS + EIS) + 20 MP Sony Exmor IMX376K (f/1.7), phase detection autofocus, dual-LED flash, Video 4K at 30 or 60fps, 1080p at 30, 60 or 240 fps, 720p at 30 or 480 fps
- Front camera: 16 MP Sony Exmor IMX371 (f/2.0, EIS, HDR), Video 1080p at 30 fps, 720p at 30 fps
- Display: 6.41 in (163 mm) 1080p (2340 ×1080 pixels) Full-HD+ Optic AMOLED / DCI-P3 (402 ppi) with 19.5:9 aspect ratio
- Sound: Bottom-facing speaker
- Connectivity: 3G, 4G VoLTE, Bluetooth 5.0 with aptX, NFC, 2x2 MIMO WiFi 802.11a/b/g/n/ac, GPS, GLONASS, BeiDou and Galileo, USB-C
- Data inputs: Fingerprint scanner (in-display), Accelerometer, gyroscope, proximity sensor, electronic compass
- Model: A6010, A6013
- Codename: Fajita
- SAR: 1.269 W/kg
- Website: oneplus.com/6t

The OnePlus 6T is an Android-based smartphone from OnePlus. It was announced on October 29, 2018, before being released on November 6. The launch was originally scheduled for October 30, but was rescheduled to avoid coinciding with Apple Inc.'s on the same day.

The OnePlus 6T is an incremental hardware update to the prior OnePlus 6. Namely through increasing the size of the display along with the device's screen-to-body ratio (to 6.41" and by about 2% respectively) by slightly shrinking the bottom "chin" bezel and using a taller, 19.5:9 AMOLED panel with more heavily curved corners and significantly smaller teardrop-shaped "notch". This is in addition to the 6T's other major changes which includes increasing the size of the battery, removing the 3.5 mm audio jack, and providing a new optical in-display fingerprint sensor.

OnePlus also announced a McLaren edition of the phone in December 2018.

== Specifications ==
As far as the 6T's physical construction goes, it has Gorilla Glass 6 on the front (new for the 6T), an aluminum mid-frame, and Gorilla Glass 5 on the rear.

=== Hardware ===
The OnePlus 6T comes with a new 6.41-inch FHD+ AMOLED display & taller 19.5:9 aspect ratio (compared to the 6's shorter 6.28-inch, 19:9 panel) and increased screen-to-body ratio (by about 2%, bringing it from almost 84% to around 86%) via the phone's slightly smaller bottom bezel (aka "chin") and the new display's more heavily curved corners & significantly smaller "teardrop" shaped "notch" (for housing the front facing RGB camera & sensors).

As far as the SOC goes, the OnePlus 6T uses the same 10 nm Qualcomm Snapdragon 845 octa-core processor as the prior model, though now backed up with a notably larger 3700 mAh battery (increased by 400 mAh). Also shared with the previous model is the imaging system, with the 6T using the same 16-megapixel and 20-megapixel camera sensors on the back and 16-megapixel sensor on the front as the 6. And depending on the specific model in question, the 6T comes with different variations of storage (128 GB, 256 GB) and RAM (6 GB, 8 GB, 10 GB); with the new base model now shipping with twice the storage capacity as previously (128 GB vs 64 GB).

For biometrics, the OnePlus 6T has a new in-display optical fingerprint sensor (replacing the rear-mounted capacitive sensor found on its predecessors), in addition to Face Unlock.

=== Software ===
It ships with OnePlus's customized version of Android, OxygenOS, which is based on Android Pie, and has since been updated to Android 11.

=== Network compatibility ===
The OnePlus 6T supports 4G, LTE, dual VoLTE, 3G, 2G and CDMA.

== McLaren edition ==
OnePlus also announced a McLaren edition of the phone similar to the Oppo Find X's Lamborghini edition and the Huawei Mate 20 Pro's Porsche Design model. The device features 10 GB of RAM and a unique color scheme OnePlus calls Papaya Orange. Due to the extra RAM, the device is more expensive than the regular 6T; it was priced at $699 in the United States. This phone also debuted with a new 30 W Warp Charge 30 unit that is significantly faster than the regular 20 W unit.

== Guinness record ==
OnePlus set a Guinness World Record title of "the most people unboxing a phone simultaneously" on the launch of OnePlus 6T 2018.

== Reception ==
Like its predecessors, the OnePlus 6T was praised for its long battery life and performance from an efficient Android build, all while still remaining relatively affordable for a flagship device. Besides value, the 6T also offered innovations that distinguished it from other phones; the in-display fingerprint scanner was generally praised as working well for a first-time implementation albeit with an inconsistent unlock speed, while "teardrop" accommodation for the front selfie camera at the top of the display was considered more aesthetic than the notch of other phones. Adding T-Mobile USA as a carrier and distribution partner in the United States would also improve sales and support compared to OnePlus's previous online-only sales model. American technology reviewer Marques Brownlee said in his Smartphone Awards video on December 18 that the OnePlus 6T is the best phone of 2018 for its affordable price and great features that are on expensive phones. The lack of a headphone jack was criticized, as well as the removal of the notification LED, while some reviewers also noted that there is still no IP67 or IP68 protection from water and dust.

| Preceded by OnePlus 6 | OnePlus 6T; 2018 | Succeeded by OnePlus 7 & 7 Pro |
