= OnePlus 8 =

2020 Android-based smartphones produced by OnePlus

OnePlus 8 OnePlus 8 Pro

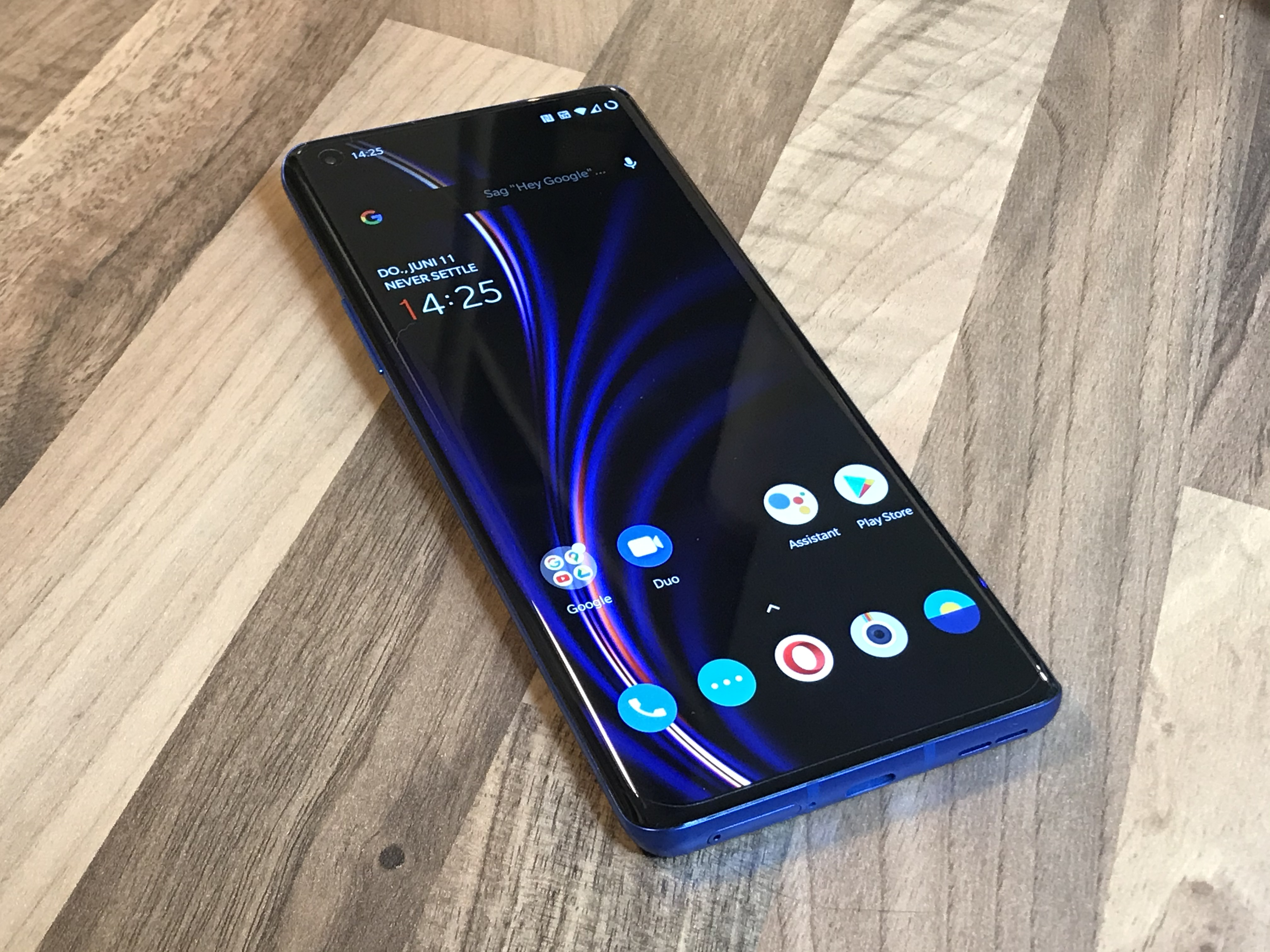
- Brand: OnePlus
- Manufacturer: OnePlus
- Type: Phablet
- First released: 14 April 2020; 6 years ago
- Availability by region: China: 17 April 2020; 6 years ago; Europe: 21 April 2020; 6 years ago; United States: 29 April 2020; 6 years ago; India: 29 May 2020; 6 years ago
- Predecessor: OnePlus 7T
- Successor: OnePlus 8T
- Related: Oppo Find X2; OnePlus Nord
- Compatible networks: 2G, 3G, 4G and 5G
- Form factor: Slate
- Dimensions: 8: 160.2 mm × 72.9 mm × 8 mm (6.31 in × 2.87 in × 0.31 in); 8 Pro: 165.3 mm × 74.4 mm × 8.5 mm (6.51 in × 2.93 in × 0.33 in)
- Weight: 8: 180 g (6.3 oz); 8 Pro: 199 g (7.0 oz)
- Operating system: Original: OxygenOS 10 (based on Android 10); Current: OxygenOS 13 (based on Android 13)
- System-on-chip: Qualcomm Snapdragon 865
- CPU: Octa-core (1x2.84 GHz Kryo 585 & 3x2.42 GHz Kryo 585 & 4x1.80 GHz Kryo 585)
- GPU: Qualcomm Adreno 650
- Memory: 8 or 12 GB RAM: 8: LPDDR4X; 8 Pro: LPDDR5
- Storage: 128 GB or 256 GB UFS 3.0
- Battery: 8: 4300 mAh; 8 Pro: 4510 mAh; Warp Charge technology
- Rear camera: 8: 48 MP, f/1.78, 25 mm, 1/2", 0.8 μm (wide) 16 MP, f/2.2, 14 mm (ultrawide) 2 MP, f/2.4, 1.75 μm (macro), PDAF; 8 Pro: 48 MP, f/1.75, 25 mm, 1/1.43", 1.12 μm (wide) 48 MP, f/2.2, 14 mm, 1/2", 0.8 μm (ultrawide) 8 MP, f/2.44, 1.0 μm (telephoto) 5 MP, f/2.4 (depth), 3x optical zoom, omnidirectional PDAF, Laser AF; Both: OIS, gyro-EIS, dual-LED flash, Auto HDR, 4K@30/60 fps, 1080p@30/60/240 fps, 720p@480 fps
- Front camera: 16 MP, f/2.45, 1/3", 1.0 μm 1080p@30 fps, Auto-HDR, gyro-EIS
- Display: Fluid AMOLED capacitive touchscreen with HDR10+ support: 8: 6.55 in (166 mm) 2400 × 1080 1080p, (402 ppi with 20:9 aspect ratio), 90 Hz refresh rate, 16 million colors; 8 Pro: 6.78 in (172 mm) 3168 × 1440 1440p, (513 ppi with 19.8:9 aspect ratio), 120 Hz refresh rate, 1 billion colors
- Sound: Dolby Atmos Dual stereo speakers with active noise cancellation
- Connectivity: Bluetooth 5.1; Wi-Fi a/b/g/n/ac/ax; A2DP, LE, aptX HD; USB 3.1 Gen 1 (OTG, PTP, MIDI)
- Data inputs: Fingerprint scanner (optical); Accelerometer; gyroscope; proximity sensor; electronic compass; Dual-band GNSS (GPS/GLONASS/BeiDou/Galileo)
- Codename: instantnoodle (OnePlus 8), instantnoodlep (OnePlus 8 Pro)
- Website: oneplus.com/8

OnePlus 8 and OnePlus 8 Pro are Android-based smartphones manufactured by OnePlus, unveiled on April 14, 2020. They became available for purchase in the United States on April 29, 2020.

== Specifications ==
=== Hardware ===
Both the OnePlus 8 and 8 Pro use the Snapdragon 865 processor with the Adreno 650 GPU, with either 128 or 256 GB of non-expandable UFS 3.0 storage. Both have 8 GB or 12 GB of RAM; the 8 has LPDDR4X RAM and the 8 Pro has faster, more efficient LPDDR5 RAM. Both have stereo speakers with active noise cancellation; there is no audio jack.

==== Design ====
The 8 and 8 Pro are constructed similarly to previous OnePlus phones, using an anodized aluminum frame and curved Gorilla Glass 5 on both the front and back. Both have a circular cutout in the upper-left-hand corner for the front-facing camera. On the 8 Pro, this replaces the pop-up camera used on the 7 Pro and 7T Pro. The rear camera module is similar to that of the 7 Pro and 7T Pro, protruding slightly from the back panel. On the 8, the dual-LED flash is located below, while on the 8 Pro, the telephoto camera, laser autofocus and dual-LED flash are all located to the left of the module. The 8 and 8 Pro are the first OnePlus phones to receive an official IP Code water resistance rating, rated at IP68. All 8 Pro models have water resistance, although for the 8 it is present only on carrier models. Both are available in Onyx Black (glossy) and Glacial Green (matte), while the 8 Pro has its own Ultramarine Blue (matte) finish. The 8 has two additional colors, a Polar Silver (matte) finish exclusive to the Verizon model, and an Interstellar Glow (glossy) finish exclusive to the T-Mobile model.

==== Display ====
AMOLED panels with HDR10+ support are used on both phones. The 8's display is carried over from the 7T, a 6.55-inch (166.4 mm) 1080p screen with a 20:9 aspect ratio and a 90 Hz refresh rate. The 8 Pro's display has a 6.78-inch (172.2 mm) 1440p screen with a 19.8:9 aspect ratio and a 120 Hz refresh rate. This makes it the first smartphone to support both 1440p resolution and a 120 Hz refresh rate. The 8 Pro has an Adaptive Display feature, similar to Apple's True Tone, and an MEMC (Motion Estimation, Motion Compensation) option akin to "motion smoothening" on high-end TVs. MEMC works with supported apps and games, and analyzes footage of at least 24 fps and interpolates frames to make the footage playback in what looks to be a higher frame rate. The 8 Pro is also one of the first smartphones able to display 1 billion colors.

Biometric options include an optical (in-display) fingerprint scanner and facial recognition.

==== Camera ====
The camera system has been changed to further differentiate the 8 and 8 Pro. The 8's camera array consists of a 48 MP wide sensor, a 16 MP ultrawide sensor, and a 2 MP macro sensor, while the 8 Pro's camera array consists of a 48 MP wide sensor, a 48 MP ultrawide sensor, an 8 MP telephoto sensor, and a 5 MP "Color Filter Camera" for infrared photography. The color filter camera was later disabled in China. The 8's wide sensor is the same as on the 7T series, the Sony IMX586, while the 8 Pro's wide sensor is the newer Sony IMX689. Unlike the 7T, the 8 does not have a telephoto camera, which is now exclusive to the 8 Pro. OnePlus also claims that the 8 Pro uses Nokia OZO audio recording technology for its triple microphone array, which is used for the Audio 3D, Audio Zoom and Audio Windscreen camera features. The front camera on both phones uses a 16 MP sensor.

==== Battery ====
The battery capacity has been increased to 4300 mAh on the 8 and 4510 mAh on the 8 Pro. Both smartphones support wired fast charging at 30W via Warp Charge, and the 8 Pro also supports wireless charging via the new OnePlus Warp Charge 30 Wireless, which is able to charge 50% of the phone's battery in under 30 minutes. The OnePlus 8 Pro also supports reverse wireless charging.

=== Software ===
The 8 and 8 Pro run on OxygenOS 11, which is based on Android 11. OnePlus states both phones would go on and continue to receive software updates until April 2023. The latest Oxygen OS version given to Oneplus 8/8Pro was Oxygen OS 13. However, Oneplus 8/8 pro are still supported by custom roms. Most notable of them include Lineage OS, Evolution X, and CrDroid, and Axion AOSP. Oneplus 8 has received Android 16 update from Lineage OS, Evolution X, CrDroid, and Axion OS.

=== Network compatibility ===
Model	GSM Bands	CDMA Bands	UMTS Bands	LTE Bands	5G Bands
8	850 / 900 / 1800 / 1900 MHz	BC0, BC1	1, 2, 4, 5, 8, 9, 19	FDD: 1, 2, 3, 4, 5, 7, 8, 12, 13, 17, 18, 19, 20, 25, 26, 28, 29, 30, 32, 66, 71 TDD: 34, 38, 39, 40, 41, 42, 46, 48	FDD: 1, 2, 3, 5, 7, 28, 66, 71 TDD: 41, 78, 79
8 5G UW	850 / 900 / 1800 / 1900 MHz	BC0, BC1	1, 2, 4, 5, 8, 9, 19	FDD: 1, 2, 3, 4, 5, 7, 8, 12, 13, 17, 18, 19, 20, 25, 26, 28, 29, 30, 32, 66, 71 TDD: 34, 38, 39, 40, 41, 42, 46, 48	FDD: 1, 2, 3, 5, 7, 28, 66, 71 TDD: 41, 78, 79 mmWave: 260, 261
8 Pro	850 / 900 / 1800 / 1900 MHz	BC0, BC1	1, 2, 4, 5, 8, 9, 19	FDD: 1, 2, 3, 4, 5, 7, 8, 12, 13, 17, 18, 19, 20, 25, 26, 28, 29, 30, 32, 66, 71 TDD: 34, 38, 39, 40, 41, 42, 46, 48	FDD: 1, 2, 3, 5, 7, 28, 66, 71 TDD: 41, 78, 79

Connectivity options have been improved with the implementation of 5G technology for all models, however only the Verizon OnePlus 8 5G UW model is compatible with ultra-fast millimeter-wave networks. Verizon and T-Mobile sell the 8 but not the 8 Pro, however the 8 Pro still works on their networks.

=== Variants ===
There are six model OnePlus 8 variants available depending on the country of intended use or USA carrier: IN2010 (China), IN2011 (India), IN2013 (Europe/Asia), North American variants include the IN2015 (NA/USA Dual Sim), IN2017 (T-Mobile), and IN2019 (Verizon). The IN2017 supports T-Mobile 5G bands, the IN2019 supports Verizon 5G bands, and no variant supports AT&T 5G bands.

There are four model OnePlus 8 Pro variants available depending on the country of intended use: IN2020 (China), IN2023 (Europe/Asia), IN2021 (India), and IN2015 (NA/USA).

Model	Variant	Region
OnePlus 8	IN2010	China
OnePlus 8	IN2011	India
OnePlus 8	IN2013	Europe/Asia
OnePlus 8	IN2015	NA/USA
OnePlus 8	IN2017	T-Mobile
OnePlus 8	IN2019	Verizon
OnePlus 8 Pro	IN2020	China
OnePlus 8 Pro	IN2021	India
OnePlus 8 Pro	IN2023	Europe/Asia
OnePlus 8 Pro	IN2025	NA/USA

== Reception ==
Both the OnePlus 8 and OnePlus 8 Pro were met with generally positive reviews from critics, with praise for the design, display, performance, and battery life. However, the price increase was said to have signified that OnePlus phones were no longer "flagship killers".

The OnePlus 8 received an 8/10 from The Verge, an 8.7/10 from CNET and a 3/5 from Digital Trends. Jon Porter of The Verge remarked that the 8 was "a phone that absolutely delivers flagship Android performance" and called the display "bright, vibrant and buttery smooth", but the camera quality was inferior to the 8 Pro; Tom's Guide and CNET also noted the lack of optical zoom. The lack of wireless charging and water resistance were criticized, and the macro camera was panned for being of limited use.

The OnePlus 8 Pro received an 8.5/10 from The Verge, an 8.6/10 from CNET and a 4/5 from Digital Trends. Mark Spoonauer of Tom's Guide stated that "overall the OnePlus 8 Pro is easily one of the best Android phones you can buy if you want a premium phone without the $1,000-plus sticker shock from Samsung or Apple". Several reviewers questioned the inclusion of the color filter sensor, which was widely seen as a gimmick.

The OnePlus 8 Pro received an overall score of 119 from DXOMARK, with a photo score of 126 and video score of 103, the tenth-highest ranking as of May 2020.

The OnePlus 8 became the first phone by OnePlus to be a part of the Android Enterprise Recommended program.

== Issues ==
After pre-orders delivered, OnePlus 8 Pro owners reported issues with black crush, green and red tints, and image retention resembling display burn-in. OnePlus has attempted to fix the display issues with software, but the issue may be with the screen hardware itself. As of 20 July 2020, the dual-SIM function on the NA version of either mode of the phone is not functional. In August 2020, users reported a dark bar appearing across the selfie camera. The issue is easily visible over gray backgrounds such as the incognito window of Google Chrome, or the Google Search app in dark mode. In October 2020, users reported battery drain issues on the OnePlus 8 Pro after updating to OxygenOS 11. A software update was released in mid-November to fix the issue.

== Controversy ==
It was discovered that the 8 Pro's Color Filter camera can see through certain plastics, including clothing, producing an X-ray like effect. This occurs because the sensor lacks an IR filter. OnePlus later apologized for "creating privacy concerns and causing troubles for OnePlus users and other netizens", and temporarily disabled the filter on Chinese models with HydrogenOS. An over-the-air update, OxygenOS 10.5.9, disabled the filter globally; however, OnePlus later stated this was an error, and subsequently pulled the update. A future update was pushed to reinstate the filter. The feature was still usable after enabling an ADB command during the shutdown period.

== See also ==
- Comparison of ARMv8-A cores, ARMv8 family
- List of Qualcomm Snapdragon processors

Preceded by OnePlus 7T & 7T Pro	OnePlus 8 & 8 Pro; 2020	Succeeded by OnePlus 8T
