= Moto G32 =

Android smartphone by Motorola

Motorola Moto G32
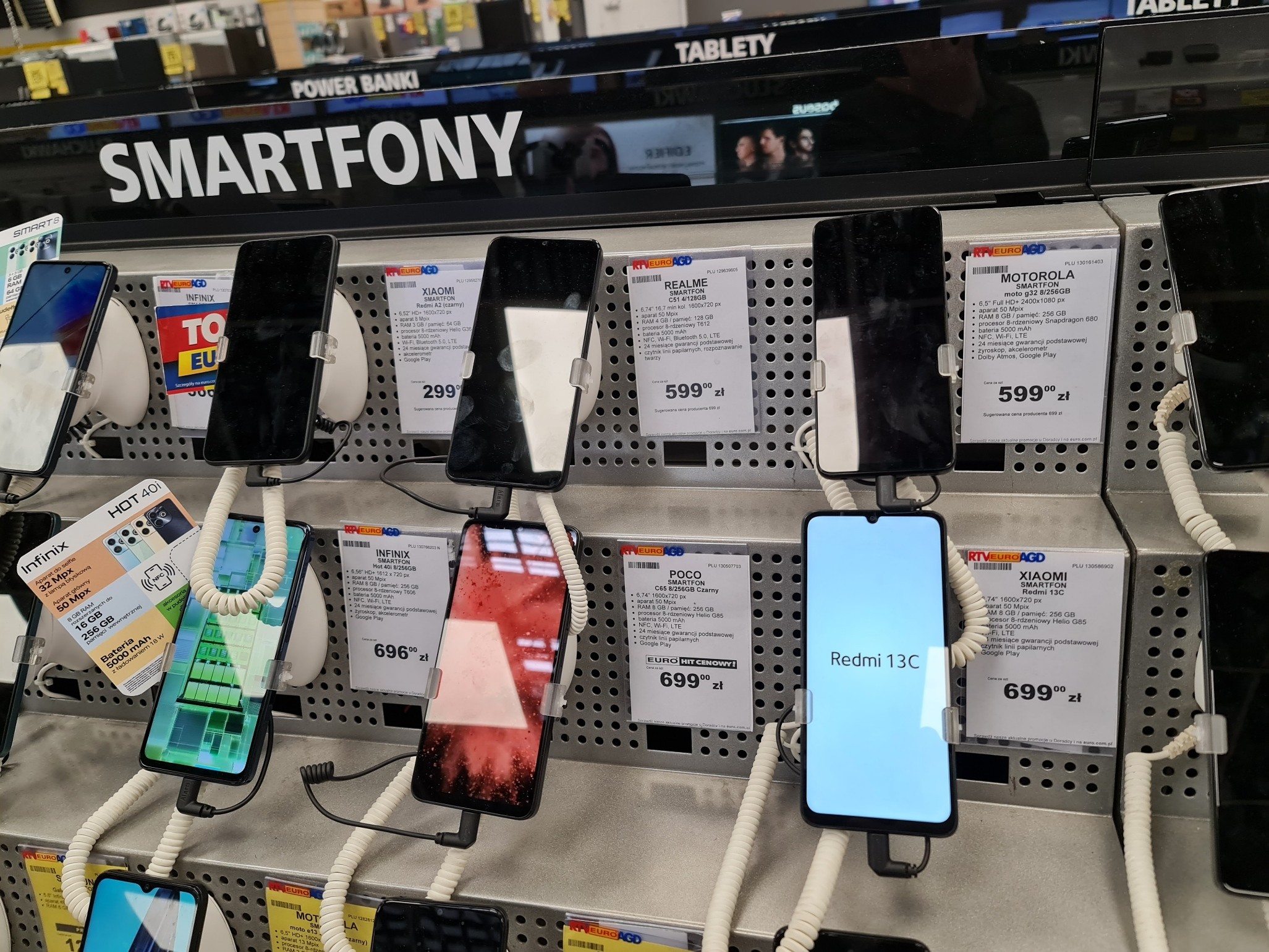
- Moto G32 (top row, right)
- Brand: Motorola
- Manufacturer: Lenovo
- Series: Moto G
- First released: August 9, 2022 (India)
- Compatible networks: GSM, HSPA, LTE
- Form factor: Slate
- Dimensions: 161.8×73.8×8.5 mm (6.37×2.91×0.33 in)
- Weight: 184 g (6.5 oz)
- Operating system: Android 12, upgradable to Android 13
- System-on-chip: Qualcomm SM6225 Snapdragon 680 4G (6 nm)
- CPU: Octa-core (4x2.4 GHz Kryo 265 Gold & 4x1.9 GHz Kryo 265 Silver)
- GPU: Adreno 610
- Memory: 4 GB, 6 GB, or 8 GB RAM
- Storage: 64 GB, 128 GB, or 256 GB
- Removable storage: microSDXC (dedicated slot)
- Battery: Li-Po 5000 mAh (non-removable), 30W wired charging
- Rear camera: Triple: • 50 MP, f/1.8 (wide), 1/2.76", 0.64µm, PDAF • 8 MP, f/2.2, 118˚ (ultrawide), 1/4.0", 1.12µm • 2 MP, f/2.4 (macro); Video: 1080p@30fps
- Front camera: 16 MP, f/2.4 (wide), 1.0µm Video: 1080p@30fps
- Display: 6.5 in (170 mm) IPS LCD, 90Hz; 1080 × 2400 pixels, 20:9 ratio (~405 ppi density)
- Sound: Stereo speakers, 3.5mm audio jack
- Connectivity: Wi-Fi 802.11 a/b/g/n/ac, dual-band, Wi-Fi Direct; Bluetooth 5.2, A2DP, LE; GPS, GLONASS, GALILEO; NFC (market/region dependent); FM radio USB-C 2.0
- Data inputs: Fingerprint (side-mounted), accelerometer, gyro, proximity, compass
- Water resistance: Water-repellent design
- Model: XT2235-2, XT2235-3

The Moto G32 is a mid-range Android smartphone manufactured, designed, and marketed by Lenovo under its smartphone brand Motorola, as part of the G series. It was announced on July 28, 2022 and launched on August 9 in India until it become available on August 16 in that year.

== Specifications ==
=== Hardware, design & build ===
The Moto G32 features a glass front, a plastic frame, and a plastic back, keeping the device's weight at 184 grams. It features a water-repellent design to protect against minor splashes. It was available at Mineral Grey, Satin Silver, and Rose Gold colorways. Below is a stereo speaker engineered by Dolby Atmos.

The phone is powered by a Qualcomm SM6225 Snapdragon 680 4G chipset, built on a 6-nanometer process. The octa-core processor consists of four 2.4 GHz Kryo 265 Gold cores for high performance and four 1.9 GHz Kryo 265 Silver cores for power efficiency, paired with an Adreno 610 GPU.

It is equipped with a 6.5-inch IPS LCD panel with a 90Hz refresh rate. The display has a Full HD+ resolution of 1080 x 2400 pixels in a 20:9 aspect ratio, yielding a pixel density of approximately 405 ppi and an 85.4% screen-to-body ratio.

Storage and memory configurations range from 64 GB of internal storage with 4 GB of RAM up to 256 GB of storage with 8 GB of RAM. Storage expansion is supported via a dedicated microSDXC slot.

=== Cameras ===
The rear camera module consists of a triple-camera system:

- 50 MP primary wide lens with an f/1.8 aperture, phase detection autofocus (PDAF), and a 1/2.76" sensor size.
- 8 MP ultrawide lens with an f/2.2 aperture and a 118-degree field of view.
- 2 MP macro/depth lens with an f/2.4 aperture.

The rear camera features an LED flash and supports High Dynamic Range (HDR) and panorama modes. The front-facing selfie camera features a single 16 MP wide lens with an f/2.4 aperture. Both front and rear cameras support video recording up to 1080p at 30 frames per second.

=== Battery and sensors ===
The device is equipped with a non-removable 5000 mAh Lithium-Polymer battery, which supports 30W wired charging via its USB Type-C 2.0 port.

Biometric authentication is handled via a side-mounted fingerprint sensor. Other sensors include an accelerometer, gyroscope, proximity sensor, and compass.

=== Software ===
The Moto G32 originally shipped with Android 12, featuring Motorola's minimal My UX user interface. It has since received an upgrade path to Android 13.
