= Oppo N1 =

Android-based smartphone

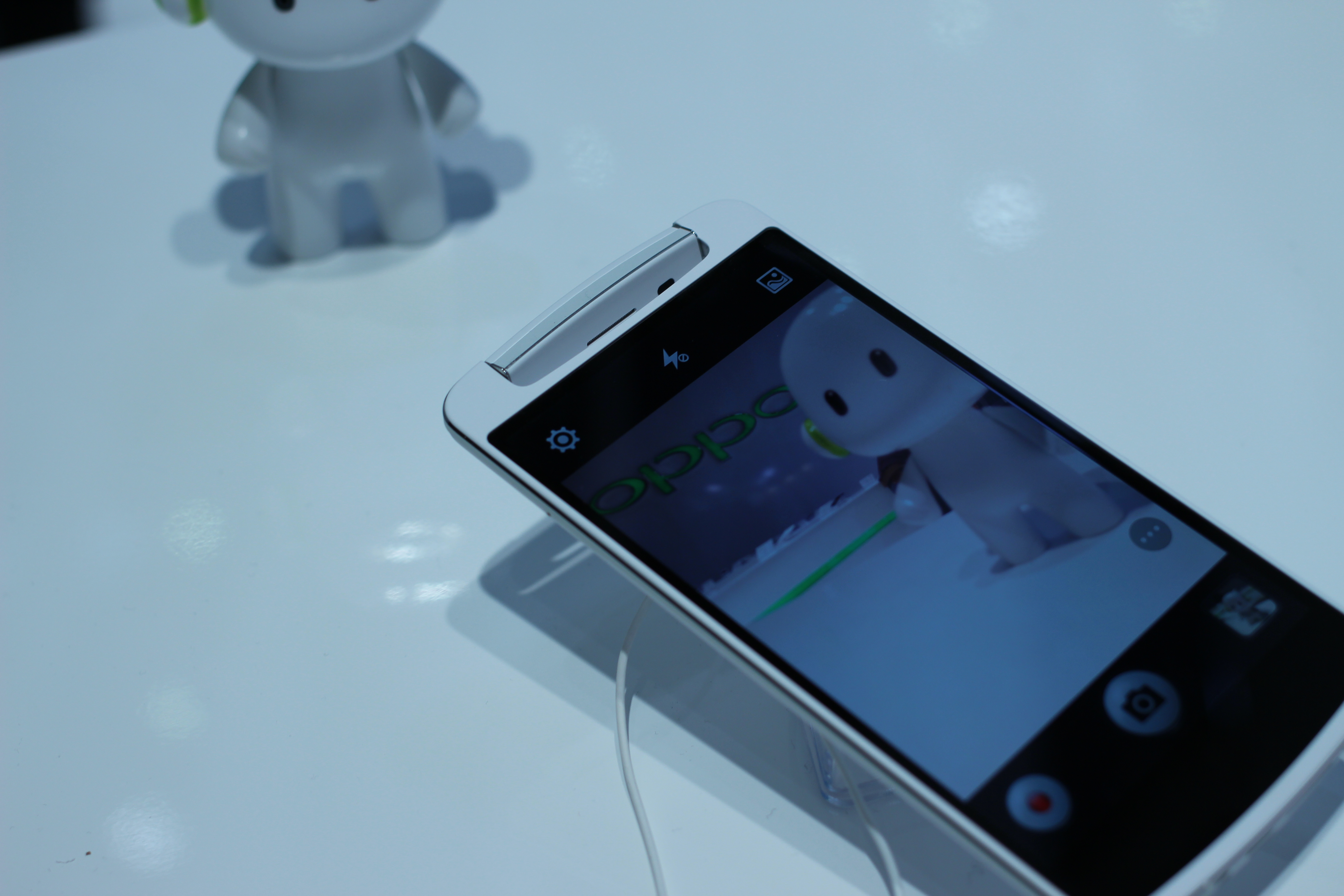
- Brand: Oppo
- Manufacturer: Oppo
- Type: Smartphone
- Series: Oppo N
- First released: December 10, 2013; 12 years ago
- Predecessor: None
- Successor: Oppo N3
- Compatible networks: GSM 850 900 1800 1900; HSPA+ 850 900 1700 1900 2100
- Form factor: Slate
- Dimensions: 170.7 mm (6.72 in) H 82.6 mm (3.25 in) W 9 mm (0.35 in) D
- Weight: 213 g (7.5 oz)
- Operating system: Android 4.2 "Jelly Bean"; CyanogenMod 10.2 (based on Android 4.3)
- CPU: 1.7 GHz quad-core Snapdragon 600
- GPU: Adreno 320
- Memory: 2 GB
- Storage: 16/32 GB
- Battery: 3610 mAh
- Rear camera: 13 MP (3264×2448 px max.); 1080p HD video recording Can swivel up to 206 degrees
- Display: 5.9 in (150 mm) diagonal (16:9 aspect ratio), multi-touch display, IPS TFT LCD, 1920x1080 pixels at 377 ppi
- Connectivity: List: Wi-Fi :802.11 b/g/n (2,4 GHz); Hotspot (Wi-Fi); DLNA; GPS/GLONASS; Bluetooth 4.0; USB 2.0; USB On-The-Go
- Codename: N1
- Other: Ambient light sensor, Gyroscope, Proximity sensor, Tilt sensor

Oppo N1 is an Android-based smartphone developed by Oppo Electronics. Unveiled on 23 September 2013, the N1 was released on 10 December 2013.

While some models shipped with Oppo's ColorOS software, the N1 was the first Android device to offer an official version of the popular aftermarket Android distribution CyanogenMod as pre-loaded software; the CyanogenMod Edition was released on 24 December 2013. CyanogenMod is also the default OS on Oppo's subsidiary OnePlus's flagship handset, OnePlus One.

Oppo N1 launched in India in August 2014.

== Specifications ==
Oppo N1 contains a quad-core, 1.7 GHz Qualcomm Snapdragon 600 processor with 2 GB of RAM, with either 16 or 32 GB of internal storage, and uses a 5.9-inch 1080p IPS display. The rear cover of the device features an "O-Touch" touchpad, which can be used for scrolling and navigation—the company claimed that this feature would help with one-handed usage. It also includes a 13-megapixel camera; the camera itself can be swiveled up to 206 degrees, allowing it to be used as either a front-facing or rear-facing camera. An "O-Click" accessory will also be included; connecting via Bluetooth, the pebble-like device can be used as an alarm, notification light, or a camera trigger.

The N1 is available with two variants of Android; a version of Android 4.2 with Oppo's custom ColorOS overlay, and a limited edition pre-loaded with version 10.2 of the popular aftermarket Android distribution CyanogenMod, a variant of the AOSP version of Android 4.3. CyanogenMod builds for the N1 will implement native support for all of the N1's hardware features, and is the first ever build of CyanogenMod to be certified under Google's compatibility standards for Android, allowing it to be pre-loaded with Google Play. Oppo N1 has officially launched in Indian Market at Price of Rs.39,999 in January in an event at New Delhi.

== See also ==
- List of Oppo products
