= OnePlus 7 =

2019 Android-based smartphones produced by OnePlus

OnePlus 7 OnePlus 7 Pro
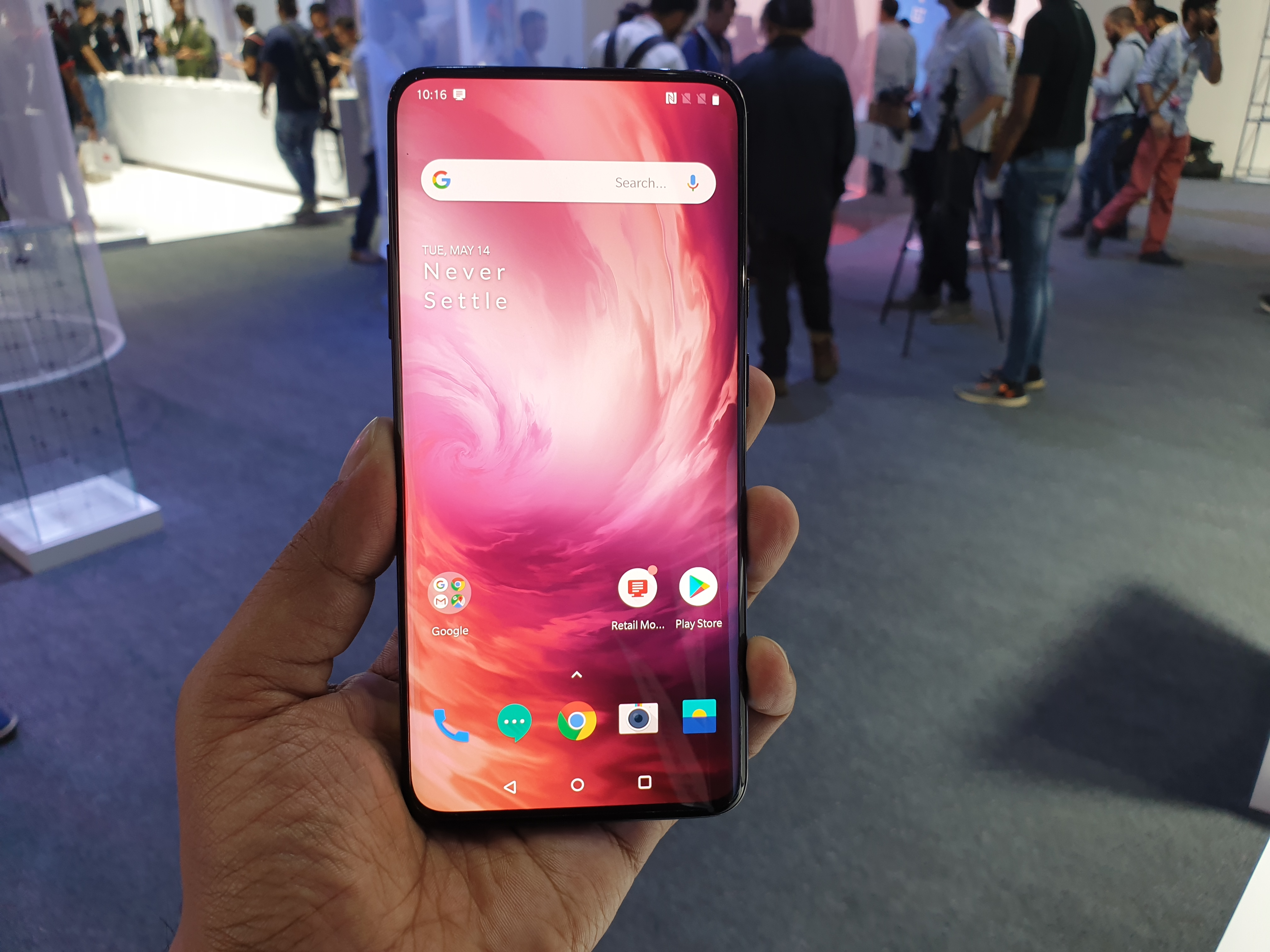
- Front side of the OnePlus 7 Pro
- Brand: OnePlus
- Manufacturer: OnePlus
- Type: Smartphone (7); Phablet (7 Pro)
- First released: May 14, 2019; 7 years ago
- Predecessor: OnePlus 6T
- Successor: OnePlus 7T
- Compatible networks: 2G, 3G, and 4G; 5G (5G model only)
- Form factor: Slate
- Dimensions: 7: 157.7 mm × 74.8 mm × 8.2 mm (6.21 in × 2.94 in × 0.32 in); 7 Pro: 162.6 mm × 75.9 mm × 8.8 mm (6.40 in × 2.99 in × 0.35 in)
- Weight: 7: 182 g (6.4 oz); 7 Pro: 206 g (7.3 oz)
- Operating system: OxygenOS (based on Android Pie); 7 and 7 Pro: Upgradable to OxygenOS 12 (Android 12) since October 2022; 7 Pro 5G: Upgradable to OxygenOS 10 (Android 10)
- System-on-chip: Qualcomm Snapdragon 855
- CPU: Octa-core (1x2.84 GHz Kryo 485 & 3x2.42 GHz Kryo 485 & 4x1.80 GHz Kryo 485)
- GPU: Adreno 640
- Memory: 6, 8, or 12 GB LPDDR4X RAM
- Storage: 128 GB or 256 GB
- Battery: 7: 3700 mAh with Dash Charge technology (20W); 7 Pro: 4000 mAh Li-Ion with Warp Charge technology (30W)
- Rear camera: 7: 48 MP, f/1.7, 1/2", 0.8 μm + 5 MP, f/2.4, 1.12 μm PDAF, OIS, Dual-LED flash, 2x zoom Video: 4K@30/60fps, 1080p@30/60/240fps, 720p@480fps, Auto HDR, gyro-EIS; 7 Pro: 48 MP, f/1.6, 1/2", 0.8 μm + 16 MP, f/2.2, 13mm (Ultrawide) + 8 MP, f/2.4, 78mm (Telephoto) Laser/PDAF, OIS, 3x zoom, Dual-LED flash Video: 4K@30/60fps, 1080p@30/60/240fps, 720p@480fps, Auto HDR, gyro-EIS
- Front camera: 16 MP, f/2.0, 25mm, 1/3.1", 1.0 μm Video: 1080p@30fps, gyro-EIS
- Display: 7: 6.41 in (163 mm) 2340×1080 1080p Optic AMOLED capacitive touchscreen, DCI-P3; 7 Pro: 6.67 in (169 mm), 3120×1440 1440p Fluid AMOLED capacitive touchscreen, (516 ppi) HDR10+, 90 Hz
- Sound: Dolby Atmos Dual stereo speakers with active noise cancellation
- Connectivity: Bluetooth 5.0; Wi-Fi a/b/g/n/ac 3G/LTE
- Data inputs: Fingerprint scanner (in-screen), Accelerometer; Gyroscope; Proximity sensor; Electronic compass; Dual-band GNSS (GPS/GLONASS/BeiDou/Galileo) with SBAS
- Codename: guacamoleb (7) guacamole (7 Pro)
- Website: oneplus.com/7 oneplus.com/7pro

The OnePlus 7 and OnePlus 7 Pro (stylized as "OnePlus 7^{Pro}") are Android-based smartphones manufactured by OnePlus. They were unveiled on 14 May 2019.

== Specifications ==
=== Design ===
Both phones have a metal/glass construction, with an anodized aluminium frame and Gorilla Glass 5 on both the front and back. The OnePlus 7 opts for a more conservative design with a notch, resembling the 6T, while the OnePlus 7 Pro has a near-full screen curved display with an 88.1% screen-to-body ratio. Both are available in Mirror Gray; Mirror Red and Mirror Blue are exclusive to the 7 while Almond and Nebula Blue are exclusive to the 7 Pro.

=== Hardware ===
Internally, both phones use the Snapdragon 855 processor with the Adreno 640 GPU. Both phones are available with either 128 or 256 GB of storage, although the 7 Pro is available with 12 GB of RAM in addition to the 6 and 8 GB variants on the 7. A version of the OnePlus 7 with 12 GB of RAM is available in China. Both phones have an AMOLED display, but the 7 Pro has a slightly larger 1440p screen as opposed to the 7's 1080p screen. The 7 Pro also has a faster 90 Hz refresh rate, rivaling gaming phones such as the ROG Phone and the Razer Phone. Both phones have stereo speakers with active noise cancellation as well. Due to the larger screen, the 7 Pro is also physically larger and has a 4000 mAh battery, the largest in a OnePlus phone. The 7 uses a 3700 mAh battery, which is the same capacity as the 6T's. Power and data connections are provided through the USB-C port; both support fast charging with the 7 rated at 20W and the 7 Pro rated at 30W. Biometric options include an optical (under-screen) fingerprint sensor and facial recognition.

==== Camera ====
The 7 Pro's all-screen design is enabled by a motorized pop-up selfie camera. The motor is rated as being capable of surviving up to 300,000 actuations. The phone will warn users if they are using the camera too often, and has fall detection which automatically retracts the camera. A warning will also be displayed if the camera is pushed back in manually. Both phones have a 16 MP sensor for the front camera, but the 7 Pro's rear cameras are noticeably upgraded. The primary sensor is 48 MP with OIS; the 7 has a 5 MP depth sensor, while the 7 Pro has a 16 MP wide-angle sensor and an S5K3M3 8 MP telephoto sensor.

=== Software ===
OnePlus released OxygenOS 12 H.41 for the 7 and 7 Pro, based on Android 12, but not the OnePlus 7 Pro 5G, which remains on OxygenOS 10.

Although the software maintenance schedule given by OnePlus mentions only two Android upgrades, the devices without 5G received these 2 upgrades to OxygenOS 10 and OxygenOS 11, and then OnePlus delivered a final upgrade to OxygenOS 12 to match the OnePlus 7T and 7T Pro, which each received only 2 upgrades, ending on the same version of OxygenOS.

=== Network compatibility ===
Model	GSM Bands	CDMA Bands	UMTS Bands	LTE Bands	5G Bands
7	850 / 900 / 1800 / 1900 MHz	BC0, BC1	1, 2, 4, 5, 8, 9, 19	FDD: 1, 2, 3, 4, 5, 7, 8, 12, 13, 17, 18, 19, 20, 26, 28, 29, 32 TDD: 34, 38, 39, 40, 41	N/A
7 Pro	850 / 900 / 1800 / 1900 MHz	BC0, BC1	1, 2, 4, 5, 8, 9, 19	FDD: 1, 2, 3, 4, 5, 7, 8, 12, 13, 17, 18, 19, 20, 25, 26, 28, 29, 30**, 32, 66, 71** TDD: 34, 38, 39, 40*, 41, 46**, 48**	N/A
7 Pro 5G	850 / 900 / 1800 / 1900 MHz	BC0, BC1	1, 2, 4, 5, 8, 9, 19	FDD: 1, 2, 3, 4, 5, 7, 8, 12, 13, 17, 18, 19, 20, 25, 26, 28, 29, 32, 66 TDD: 34, 38, 39, 40, 41	n41 NSA**, n78*

Notes: * denotes global, ** denotes North America

The regular OnePlus 7 was not available in the United States.

=== Variants ===
Both OnePlus 7 and OnePlus 7 Pro have several variants. The differences are usually with the supported bands. The pricing for the OnePlus 7 varied across international markets. OnePlus 7 has been sold for as much as $690 in Europe but later got a price reduction, retailing for as low as $465 when purchased directly from OnePlus. A Mirror Blue variant, which was launched in India, cost roughly $480. The price of the base model of OnePlus 7 Pro was around $670 while its higher end variants were sold for as much as $749.

Model	Variant	Region
OnePlus 7	GM1900	Chinese / HK
OnePlus 7	GM1901	Indian
OnePlus 7	GM1903	Europe
OnePlus 7	GM1905	Global
Model	Variant	Region
OnePlus 7 Pro	GM1910	Chinese / HK
OnePlus 7 Pro	GM1911	Indian
OnePlus 7 Pro	GM1913	Europe
OnePlus 7 Pro	GM1915	T-Mobile
OnePlus 7 Pro	GM1917	North America
Model	Variant	Region
OnePlus 7 Pro 5G	GM1920	Europe
OnePlus 7 Pro 5G	GM1925	Sprint

== Reception ==
The OnePlus 7 Pro was received positively, with CNET giving it an 8.8/10, The Verge giving it an 8.5/10, Wired giving it an 8/10 and Engadget giving it a 91. The screen, performance, cameras and design were all praised, but it received some criticism for the lack of an IP Rating, wireless charging and a headphone jack. Engadget called it "a beast of a device that delivers fantastic mobile cinematic plus gaming experience, and one that’s in a well-designed package".

The 7 Pro received a score of 111 from DxOMark, it ranked as the third best smartphone camera at the time behind the P30 Pro and Galaxy S10 5G. It has a photo score of 118 and a video score of 98.

Marques Brownlee considered the 7 Pro to be the smartphone of 2019 because it "felt like the best, most complete smartphone of the year".

== See also ==
- Comparison of ARMv8-A cores, ARMv8 family
- List of Qualcomm Snapdragon processors

Preceded by OnePlus 6T	OnePlus 7 & 7 Pro; 2019	Succeeded by OnePlus 7T & 7T Pro
