= OxygenOS =

Android-based mobile user interface developed by OnePlus

- Developer: OnePlus
- OS family: Android
- Working state: Discontinued
- Source model: Proprietary
- Initial release: 27 March 2015; 11 years ago
- Final release: OxygenOS 16 / November 1, 2025; 12 months ago
- Final preview: Oxygen 16 Open Beta / October 6, 2025; 13 months ago
- Available in: 40 languages
- List of languages English, Malay, Catalan, Czech, Danish, German, Spanish, Filipino, French, Croatian, Italian, Hungarian, Dutch, Norwegian, Polish, Portuguese, Romanian, Slovak, Slovenian, Finnish, Swedish, Vietnamese, Turkish, Russian, Ukrainian, Hebrew, Urdu, Arabic, Marathi, Hindi, Bengali, Gujarati, Tamil, Telugu, Kannada, Thai, Japanese, Korean, Greek, Chinese
- License: Mixed (Copyleft, Lax, and Proprietary licence)
- Succeeded by: ColorOS 17 onwards
- Official website: OxygenOS

OxygenOS (Chinese: 氧OS; pinyin: yǎng OS) was an Android-based operating system (OS) developed by Chinese smartphone manufacturer OnePlus exclusively for their smartphones. OxygenOS was developed for their overseas market. There used to also be another version of the OS designed specifically for the Chinese market called HydrogenOS (Chinese: 氢OS; pinyin: qīng OS). On July 16, 2026, OnePlus announced that OxygenOS would shut down, along with the announcement that it would exit the North America and Europe markets.

== History ==
In an interview published on 3 September 2016, XDA Developers revealed OnePlus was "actively merging both platforms (OxygenOS and HydrogenOS) into a single cohesive operating system based on Android".

In July 2021, OnePlus merged OxygenOS with Oppo's ColorOS. Both companies' software will remain separate and continue to serve their individual regions (OxygenOS for OnePlus phones globally, ColorOS on OnePlus and Oppo devices in China) but share a common codebase, which OnePlus says should standardize its software experience and streamline the development process for future OxygenOS updates.As of July 2026, Oppo said that existing OnePlus devices in the United States and Europe would transition from OnePlus's OxygenOS 16 to Oppo's ColorOS 17 for future software updates. The company said that software updates and after-sales support would continue, and also users will have the option to roll back to OxygenOS 16.

== Version History ==
Logo of HydrogenOS

- Version 1.0 was based on Android 5.0.1 and was available only for the OnePlus One via a flashable ZIP provided through the OnePlus website.
- Notable features of version 2.0 and 2.1.1 include app permissions, Waves MaxxAudio, Microsoft SwiftKey keyboard, off-screen gestures, custom icons, dark mode, manual camera mode, and RAW support for 3rd party apps, like Camera FV-5 2.75.
- On 31 December 2016, OnePlus released OxygenOS 4.0.0 based on Android Nougat and includes its features and several other modifications to the public via OTA download.
- On 31 January 2018, OnePlus released OxygenOS 5.0.3 based on Android Oreo to the public via OTA download. In May 2018, OnePlus launched OnePlus 6 with OxygenOS based on Android Oreo 8.1.
- On 29 October 2018, OnePlus launched OnePlus 6T with OxygenOS 9.0 based on Android Pie.
- On 25 December 2018, OnePlus released OxygenOS 9.0.0 based on Android Pie for OnePlus 5/5T to the public via OTA download.
- On 21 September 2019, OnePlus announced the release of OxygenOS version 10.0 based on Android 10 for OnePlus 7 and 7 Pro. This initial release was followed by Android 10 based builds for older devices later.
- On 6 August 2022, OnePlus announced OxygenOS 13, which is based on Android 13. OxygenOS 13 is eligible for OnePlus 10 series to OnePlus 8 series smartphones and some Nord smartphones.
- On 25 September 2023, OnePlus announced that it would globally launch the Android 14-based OxygenOS 14.

== Devices running on OxygenOS ==
Device	Original version	Current version
OnePlus One	Cyanogen OS 11 (Android 4.4.2)	OxygenOS 2.1.4 (Android 5.1.1)
OnePlus 2	OxygenOS 2.0 (Android 5.1.1)	OxygenOS 3.5 (Android 6.0.1)
OnePlus X	OxygenOS 2.0 (Android 5.1.1)	OxygenOS 3.1 (Android 6.0.1)
OnePlus 3	OxygenOS 3.2 (Android 6.0.1)	OxygenOS 9.0 (Android 9)
OnePlus 3T	OxygenOS 3.5 (Android 6.0.1)	OxygenOS 9.0 (Android 9)
OnePlus 5	OxygenOS 4.5 (Android 7.1.1)	OxygenOS 10.0 (Android 10)
OnePlus 5T	OxygenOS 4.5 (Android 7.1.1)	OxygenOS 10.0 (Android 10)
OnePlus 6	OxygenOS 5.0 (Android 8.1)	OxygenOS 11.1 (Android 11)
OnePlus 6T	OxygenOS 9.0 (Android 9)	OxygenOS 11.1 (Android 11)
OnePlus 7 / 7 Pro	OxygenOS 9.0 (Android 9)	OxygenOS 12.0 (Android 12)
OnePlus 7T / 7T Pro	OxygenOS 10.0 (Android 10)	OxygenOS 12.0 (Android 12)
OnePlus 8 / 8 Pro	OxygenOS 10.0 (Android 10)	OxygenOS 13.0 (Android 13)
OnePlus 9R	OxygenOS 11.0 (Android 11)	OxygenOS 14.0 (Android 14)
OnePlus 8T	OxygenOS 11.0 (Android 11)	OxygenOS 14.0 (Android 14)
OnePlus 9 / 9 Pro	OxygenOS 11.1 (Android 11)	OxygenOS 14.0 (Android 14)
OnePlus 10 Pro / 10R / 10T	OxygenOS 12.1 (Android 12)	OxygenOS 15.0 (Android 15)
OnePlus 11 / 11R	OxygenOS 13.0 (Android 13)	OxygenOS 16.0 (Android 16)
OnePlus 12 / 12R	OxygenOS 14.0 (Android 14)	OxygenOS 16.0 (Android 16)
OnePlus 13 / 13R / 13s	OxygenOS 15.0 (Android 15)	OxygenOS 16.0 (Android 16)
OnePlus 15 / 15R	OxygenOS 16.0 (Android 16)	OxygenOS 16.0 (Android 16)
OnePlus Nord Series
OnePlus Nord	OxygenOS 10.0 (Android 10)	OxygenOS 12.1 (Android 12)
OnePlus Nord N10 5G	OxygenOS 10.5 (Android 10)	OxygenOS 11.1 (Android 11)
OnePlus Nord N100	OxygenOS 10.5 (Android 10)	OxygenOS 11.1 (Android 11)
OnePlus Nord CE 5G	OxygenOS 11.0 (Android 11)	OxygenOS 12.1 (Android 12)
OnePlus Nord N200 5G	OxygenOS 11.0 (Android 11)	OxygenOS 12.1 (Android 12)
OnePlus Nord 2 5G	OxygenOS 11.3 (Android 11)	OxygenOS 13.0 (Android 13)
OnePlus Nord 2T 5G	OxygenOS 12.1 (Android 12)	OxygenOS 13.1 (Android 13)
OnePlus Nord CE 2 5G	OxygenOS 11.3 (Android 11)	OxygenOS 13.1 (Android 13)
OnePlus Nord CE 2 Lite 5G	OxygenOS 12.1 (Android 12)	OxygenOS 14.0 (Android 14)
OnePlus Nord N20 5G	OxygenOS 11.3 (Android 11)	OxygenOS 13.1 (Android 13)
OnePlus Nord N20 SE	OxygenOS 12.1 (Android 12)	OxygenOS 14.0 (Android 14)
OnePlus Nord 3 5G	OxygenOS 13.1 (Android 13)	OxygenOS 15.0 (Android 15)
OnePlus Nord CE 3 5G	OxygenOS 13.1 (Android 13)	OxygenOS 15.0 (Android 15)
OnePlus Nord CE 3 Lite 5G	OxygenOS 13.1 (Android 13)	OxygenOS 15.0 (Android 15)
OnePlus Nord N30 5G	OxygenOS 13.1 (Android 13)	OxygenOS 15.0 (Android 15)
OnePlus Nord N30 SE 5G	OxygenOS 13.1 (Android 13)	OxygenOS 15.0 (Android 15)
OnePlus Nord 4	OxygenOS 14.1 (Android 14)	OxygenOS 16.0 (Android 16)
OnePlus Nord CE4	OxygenOS 14.1 (Android 14)	OxygenOS 16.0 (Android 16)
OnePlus Nord CE4 Lite	OxygenOS 14.1 (Android 14)	OxygenOS 16.0 (Android 16)
OnePlus Nord 5	OxygenOS 15.0 (Android 15)	OxygenOS 16.0 (Android 16)
OnePlus Nord CE5	OxygenOS 15.0 (Android 15)	OxygenOS 16.0 (Android 16)
OnePlus Nord 6	OxygenOS 16.0 (Android 16)	OxygenOS 16.0 (Android 16)
OnePlus Nord CE6	OxygenOS 16.0 (Android 16)	OxygenOS 16.0 (Android 16)
OnePlus Nord CE6 Lite	OxygenOS 16.0 (Android 16)	OxygenOS 16.0 (Android 16)
OnePlus Pad Series
OnePlus Pad	OxygenOS 13.1 (Android 13)	OxygenOS 16.0 (Android 16)
OnePlus Pad 2	OxygenOS 15.0 (Android 15)	OxygenOS 16.0 (Android 16)

== Privacy ==
OnePlus released a statement about data collection and analytics, claiming that the data is only used for system improvement and optimization, are not shared with third parties, and can be disabled by users in the system settings. OnePlus also says that they are revising the data analysis mechanism, and will no longer collect certain data.
