= OnePlus =

Chinese consumer electronics manufacturer, a subsidiary of Oppo

OnePlus Technology (Shenzhen) Co., Ltd.
- Native name: 一加科技
- Type: Subsidiary
- Industry: Consumer electronics
- Founded: 15 December 2013; 12 years ago
- Founders: Pete Lau; Carl Pei
- Headquarters: Tairan Building, Futian District, Shenzhen, Guangdong, China
- Area served: Worldwide (formerly Europe and North America)
- Key people: Pete Lau (CEO)
- Products: Smartphones; Earphones; Powerbanks; OxygenOS; Phone cases Shirts; Bags; Televisions; Smart Watch
- Number of employees: 2,700+ (2019)
- Parent: Oppo

OnePlus Technology (Shenzhen) Co., Ltd.
- Simplified Chinese: 深圳市万普拉斯科技有限公司
- Traditional Chinese: 深圳市萬普拉斯科技有限公司
Transcriptions
Standard Mandarin
- Hanyu Pinyin: Shēnzhèn shì Wànpǔlāsī Kējì Yǒuxiàn Gōngsī
- IPA: [ʂə́nʈʂə̂n ʂɻ̩̂ wânpʰùlásɹ̩́ kʰɤ́tɕî jòʊɕjɛ̂n kʊ́ŋsɹ̩́]
Yue: Cantonese
- Yale Romanization: Sāmjan síh Maahnpóulāaisī Fōgeih Yáuhhahn Gūngsī
- Jyutping: Sam^{1}zan^{3} si^{5} Maan^{6}pou^{2}laai^{1}si^{1} Fo^{1}gei^{6} Jau^{5}haan^{6} Gung^{1}si^{1}
- IPA: [sɐ́mtsɐ̄n si̬ː màːnpʰǒuláːisíː fɔ́ːkèi jɐ̬uhàːn kóŋsíː]

OnePlus
- Chinese: 一加
- Literal meaning: OnePlus
Transcriptions
Standard Mandarin
- Hanyu Pinyin: Yījiā
- IPA: [ítɕjá]
Yue: Cantonese
- Yale Romanization: Yātgā
- Jyutping: Jat1gaa1
- IPA: [jɐt̚˥ka˥]
- Website: oneplus.com

OnePlus Technology (Shenzhen) Co., Ltd. (Chinese: 一加科技; pinyin: Yījiā Kējì; lit. 'one plus technology'), doing business as OnePlus, is a Chinese consumer electronics manufacturer headquartered in Shenzhen, Guangdong, China. It is a subsidiary of Oppo.

OnePlus was founded by Pete Lau and Carl Pei on 16 December 2013 to develop a high-end flagship smartphone running Cyanogen OS that would come to be known as the OnePlus One. OnePlus would continue to release smartphones afterwards. In 2020, OnePlus released the OnePlus Nord, its first mid-range smartphone since the OnePlus X in 2015. Pei would oversee the design and marketing of OnePlus' products until his departure from the company in October 2020, going on to found the consumer electronics manufacturer Nothing.

== History ==
=== 2013–2014: Founding and OnePlus One ===
OnePlus Technology (Shenzhen) Co., Ltd. was founded on 16 December 2013 by former Oppo vice-president Pete Lau and Carl Pei. According to Chinese public records, OnePlus' only Institutional investor is Oppo Electronics. Lau denied that OnePlus was a subsidiary of Oppo and stated that Oppo Electronics and not Oppo Mobile (the phone manufacturer) is a major investor of OnePlus. Lau went on to state that they were "in talks with other investors", although OnePlus has confirmed it uses Oppo's manufacturing line and shares part of the supply chain resources with Oppo.

We will never be different just for the sake of being different. Everything done has to improve the actual user experience in day-to-day use.

— Pete Lau

Lau founded OnePlus with the intent to design a smartphone that would balance high-end quality with a lower price than other phones in its class, believing that users would "never settle" (a slogan that would come to be used by OnePlus in its marketing material) for the lower-quality devices produced by other companies. The name "OnePlus" originates from and encapsulates this same philosophy, with "1" representing the status quo and the "+" the desire to improve upon it, as well as the ambition to share good products with the world. Lau also showed aspirations of being the "Muji of the tech industry", emphasizing its focus on high-quality products with simplistic, user-friendly designs. Continuing Lau's association with the platform from the Oppo N1, OnePlus entered into an exclusive licensing agreement with Cyanogen Inc. to base its products' Android distribution upon a variant of the popular custom ROM CyanogenMod and use its trademarks outside of China. OnePlus would later develop a version of Android, known as OxygenOS, for use in its phones.

The OnePlus One was introduced on 23 April 2014 as OnePlus' first smartphone. It differed from its competitors—largely flagship devices from larger phone manufacturers, in its usage of CyanogenOS, its openness to developers, and its price-to-performance ratio in comparison to its hardware, although criticism was levied for technical issues. In order to reduce marketing costs, OnePlus relied instead on word of mouth and initially only allowed purchases via an invite system. Throughout early 2014, OnePlus would continue to expand, hiring Chinese celebrity author Han Han to help market its products in mainland China and expanding its operations to the European Union in March of that year. In December 2014, alongside the release of the OnePlus One in India exclusively through Amazon, OnePlus also announced plans to establish a presence in the country, with plans to open 25 official walk-in service centers across India.

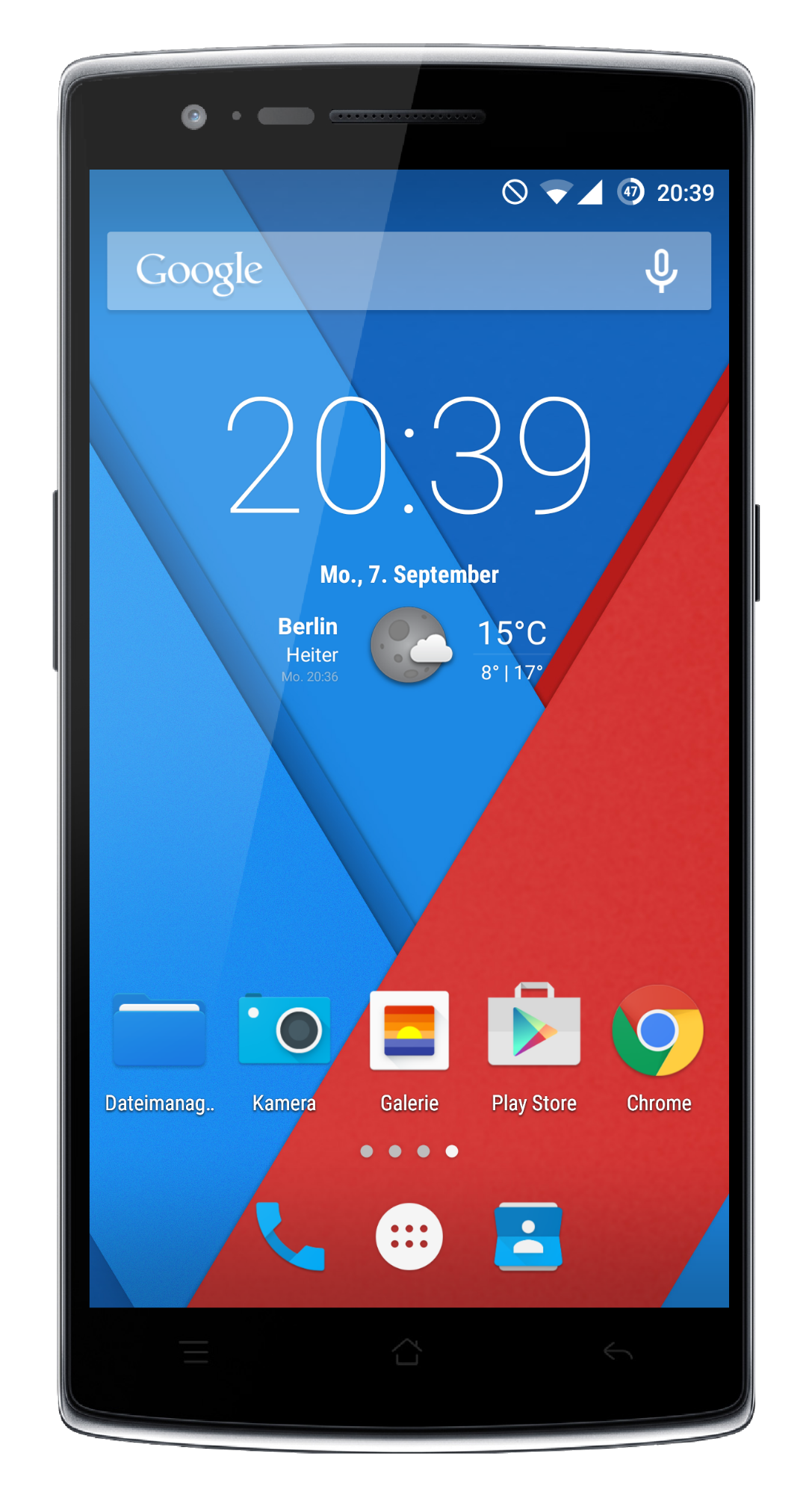
The OnePlus One, OnePlus' first device

=== 2015–2019: Continued success, expansions in Southeast Asia ===
In 2015, OnePlus began an effort to expand in Southeast Asia, making its products available in the region for the first time, partnering with Lazada Indonesia in January 2015. In June 2016, OnePlus decided to pull out of the Indonesian market due to local regulations for imported 4G smartphones restricting sales of the OnePlus 2.

Also in 2015, OnePlus unveiled the OnePlus X, the company's first foray into the budget device market.

In May 2018, OnePlus would release the OnePlus Bullets Wireless Headphones. In September of that year, OnePlus announced that it would be producing a line of smart TVs with OnePlus TV exclusively sold in India. The initial model of the OnePlus TV line, the OnePlus TV Q1, was released in September 2019.

=== 2020–2026: Further product launches, expansion to more markets, Carl Pei's resignation ===
OnePlus would release a series of new products in 2020, including the OnePlus Buds and the OnePlus Nord in July, the latter being OnePlus' first budget device since the release of the OnePlus X in 2015.

On 16 October 2020, Carl Pei resigned as the marketing director of OnePlus.

In 2021, Oppo and OnePlus would begin to build a partnership, combining their hardware research teams in January of that year. In July 2021, OnePlus merged OxygenOS, its Android-based operating system used since the OnePlus X and Oppo's ColorOS. The software of both companies continues to remain separate and serve their individual regions with OxygenOS for OnePlus phones globally and ColorOS on OnePlus and Oppo devices in China but share a common codebase, which OnePlus says should standardize its software experience and streamline the development process for future OxygenOS updates.

In May 2024, OnePlus expanded by establishing official operations in Bangladesh. The company also started assembling smartphones locally and announced that it would begin to sell its full range of products in the country.

=== 2026–present: Restructuring and market withdrawal ===
In early 2026, it was widely reported that OnePlus would wind down operations in several global markets, which the company initially refuted. In April, OnePlus said it was “evaluating its regional roadmap and product strategy” in North America, while also stating that after-sales support, software updates, and user rights commitments for existing users would remain guaranteed.

On 16 July 2026, after several months of speculation, OnePlus confirmed that it would withdraw from the United States and Europe and cease releasing new products in those markets. Oppo said that existing devices would continue receiving previously promised software updates and after-sales support, and that it would assume OnePlus warranty obligations in Europe. Bloomberg reported that the withdrawal was planned to expand to other markets, including India, in 2027, which would leave OnePlus active only in China.

== Products ==
=== Smartphones ===
OnePlus releases three lines of smartphones: its flagship "OnePlus" line, mid-range Ace line, which is exclusive for the Chinese market, and its budget-oriented Nord line. Both lines are equipped with an Android-based operating system known as OxygenOS or ColorOS.

As of 3 September 2025, over 50 models in the OnePlus line have been produced, with 28 traditional international and north American smartphones, 12 smartphones in the Nord line, and 14 models in the China-only Ace line have been released. Models include:

==== Regional and international market ====
- OnePlus One – April 2014
- OnePlus 2 – July 2015
- OnePlus X – October 2015
- OnePlus 3 – June 2016
- OnePlus 3T – November 2016
- OnePlus 5 – June 2017
- OnePlus 5T – November 2017
- OnePlus 6 – May 2018
- OnePlus 6T – October 2018
- OnePlus 6T McLaren Edition - December 2018
- OnePlus 7 – May 2019
- OnePlus 7 Pro – May 2019
- OnePlus 7 Pro 5G – May 2019
- OnePlus 7T – September 2019
- OnePlus 7T Pro – October 2019
- OnePlus 7T Pro McLaren Edition – November 2019
- OnePlus 8 – April 2020
- OnePlus 8 Pro – April 2020
- OnePlus 8T – October 2020
- OnePlus 9 – March 2021
- OnePlus 9 Pro – March 2021
- OnePlus 9R – April 2021
- OnePlus 9RT - October 2021
- OnePlus 10 Pro – January 2022
- OnePlus 10T – August 2022
- OnePlus 10R - April 2022
- OnePlus 10R 150W - April 2022
- OnePlus 11 – January 2023
- OnePlus 11R – February 2023
- OnePlus 12 – December 2023
- OnePlus 12R – January 2024
- OnePlus 13 – November 2024 (China), January 2025 (International)
- OnePlus 13R – December 2024 (China), January 2025 (International)
- OnePlus 13T - April 2025
- OnePlus 13s – June 2025
- OnePlus 15 - October 2025 (China), November 2025 (International)
- OnePlus 15R - December 2025
- OnePlus 15T - March 2026
- OnePlus 16 - October 2026

==== Nord series ====
- OnePlus Nord – July 2020
- OnePlus Nord CE 5G – June 2021
- OnePlus Nord N200 5G – June 2021
- OnePlus Nord 2 5G – July 2021
- OnePlus Nord CE 2 5G – February 2022
- OnePlus Nord CE 2 Lite 5G – April 2022
- OnePlus Nord N20 5G – April 2022
- OnePlus Nord 2T 5G – May 2022
- OnePlus Nord N20 SE – August 2022
- OnePlus Nord N300 5G – November 2022
- OnePlus Nord CE 3 5G – April 2023
- OnePlus Nord CE 3 Lite 5G – April 2023
- OnePlus Nord N30 5G – June 2024
- OnePlus Nord 3 5G – July 2023
- OnePlus Nord N30 SE 5G – January 2024
- OnePlus Nord CE4 – April 2024
- OnePlus Nord CE4 Lite – July 2024
- OnePlus Nord 4 – July 2024
- OnePlus Nord 5 – July 2025
- OnePlus Nord CE5 - July 2025
- OnePlus Nord 6 - April 2026
- OnePlus Nord CE6 - May 2026
- OnePlus Nord CE6 Lite - May 2026

==== N series (India-only) ====
- OnePlus N6 – July 2026
- OnePlus N6x – August 2026
- OnePlus N6 Lite – September 2026

==== Ace series (China-only) ====
- OnePlus Ace – April 2022
- OnePlus Ace Pro – August 2022
- OnePlus Ace Racing Edition – May 2022
- OnePlus Ace 2 – February 2023
- OnePlus Ace 2 Pro – August 2023
- OnePlus Ace 2V – March 2023
- OnePlus Ace 3 – February 2024
- OnePlus Ace 3 Pro – August 2024
- OnePlus Ace 3V – March 2024
- OnePlus Ace 3 Racing Edition – August 2024
- OnePlus Ace 5 – December 2024
- OnePlus Ace 5 Pro – December 2024
- OnePlus Ace 5 Ultra – May 2025
- OnePlus Ace 5 Racing Edition – May 2025
- OnePlus Ace 6 - Oct 2025
- OnePlus Ace 6T - Dec 2025
- OnePlus Ace 6 Ultra - April 2026

==== Turbo series (China-only) ====
- OnePlus Turbo 6 – January 2026
- OnePlus Turbo 6V – January 2026
- OnePlus Turbo 6X – June 2026
- OnePlus Turbo 6X Pro – June 2026

=== Wearables ===
OnePlus has released various wearables, including the OnePlus Watch 2 and 2R, and the Watch 3 and 3 Lite

=== Tablets ===
OnePlus has released various tablets, including the OnePlus Pad, OnePlus Pad Go, OnePlus Pad 2, and OnePlus Pad 3.

=== TVs ===
OnePlus TV remained exclusive to India in the brand's lineup of products. They have seemingly been discontinued as the Chinese maker has removed the segment (including its India-exclusive Monitors) from its official Indian website.

== Advertising and marketing ==
=== Invitation system ===
Early phones were only available through a system whereby customers had to sign up for an invitation, which OnePlus called an invite, to purchase the phone at irregular intervals. The system was claimed to be necessary for the young company to manage huge demand. OnePlus ended the invitation system with the launch of OnePlus 3 on 14 June 2016. Announced via an interactive VR launch event, the OnePlus 3 initially went on sale within the VR app itself. OnePlus touted the event as the world's first VR shopping experience. The phone was made available for sale later that day in China, North America and the European Union on the OnePlus website, and in India on Amazon India.

=== "Smash the Past" ===
On 23 April 2014, OnePlus launched its "Smash the Past" campaign. The promotion asked selected participants to destroy their phones on video to purchase the OnePlus One for $1 (US). Due to confusion, several videos were published by unselected users misinterpreting the promotion and destroying their phones before the promotion start date. OnePlus later revised the rules of its promotion by encouraging prospective participants to donate their old phones. There were 140,000 entrants in the contest with 100 winners.

=== OnePlus Playback ===
OnePlus Playback is a series of music videos in collaboration with popular Indian singers, beginning in 2018.

=== Brand ambassador ===
In May 2019, OnePlus made a deal with Avengers actor Robert Downey Jr. to endorse the OnePlus 7 Pro. Previously, Indian actor Amitabh Bachchan endorsed OnePlus in India.

=== Partnership with Hasselblad ===
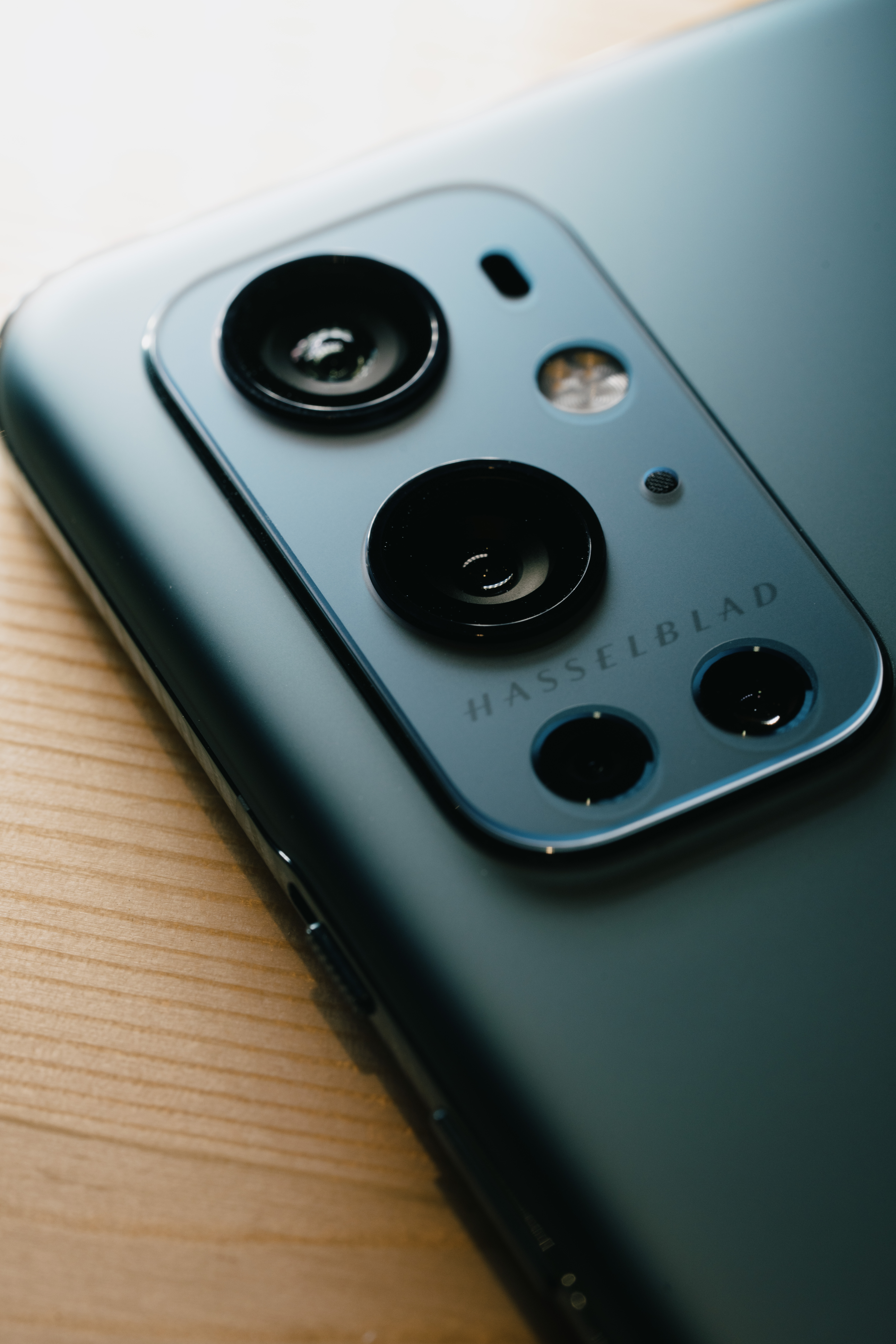
OnePlus 9 Pro module with Hasselblad camera

On 8 March 2021, OnePlus announced a $150 million deal with Hasselblad to develop camera technology for OnePlus, which also included the new OnePlus 9 series phones that had improved color processing and computational photography developed in partnership with Hasselblad. With the launch of OnePlus 15, the partnership with Hasselblad ended.

== Criticism and controversies ==
=== "Ladies First" controversy ===
For the launch of the OnePlus One in 2014, OnePlus hosted a contest to give invites—which were hard to come by at the time—to their female forum members. Users were asked to post a photo of themselves with the OnePlus logo; images would be shared in the forum and could be "liked" by other forum members. This received major backlash for objectifying and degrading women, resulting in the contest being pulled within hours.

=== Micromax antitrust lawsuit ===
On 16 December 2014, the Supreme Court of India and the Delhi High Court banned the import and sale of OnePlus One phones following a lawsuit by Micromax Informatics alleging it had exclusivity for shipping phones with Cyanogen OS software in India. On 21 December 2014, the ban was lifted, and the device continued to be shipped with Cyanogen OS. The following year a customized version of Android, specially designed by OnePlus and named OxygenOS was released, allowing later OnePlus devices to be sold in India.

=== OnePlus USB-C cable incident ===
Throughout 2015, OnePlus received criticism for its manufacturing of its USB-C cables. After several weeks of customer complaints on OnePlus forums and on Reddit, Google engineer Benson Leung showed that the USB-C cable and USB-C to Micro-USB adapter offered by OnePlus at that time did not conform to the USB specification. OnePlus co-founder Carl Pei later admitted that this was true, and offered refunds (although not for cables bundled with the OnePlus 2 phone).

=== Customer support ===
OnePlus' customer support has been the subject of criticism. In 2017, the company increased the number of customer service staff and set up customer service and repair centers in Asia, Europe, and the United States, aiming to improve turnaround times for repairs and other issues.

=== App performance throttling ===
In July 2021, the company was accused of and then admitted to throttling app performance. The throttling was uncovered by an investigation done by AnandTech, discovering that the OnePlus 9 significantly diminished the performance of Chrome in an effort to "improve battery life".

== See also ==
- OnePlus TV
- List of mobile phone brands by country
