= OnePlus Ace =

Android smartphones

OnePlus Ace (OnePlus 10R) OnePlus Ace Pro (OnePlus 10T) OnePlus Ace Racing
- Brand: OnePlus
- Manufacturer: OnePlus
- Type: Phablet
- Series: OnePlus
- First released: Ace: April 26, 2022; 4 years ago; Ace Pro: August 15, 2022; 3 years ago; Ace Racing: May 31, 2022; 4 years ago
- Predecessor: OnePlus 9RT; Oppo Ace2
- Successor: OnePlus Ace 2
- Related: OnePlus 10 Pro; Realme GT Neo3
- Compatible networks: GSM / CDMA / HSPA / EVDO / LTE / 5G
- Form factor: Slate
- Colors: Black, Blue
- Dimensions: Ace: 163.3 mm (6.43 in) H 75.5 mm (2.97 in) W 8.2 mm (0.32 in) D; Ace Pro: 163 mm (6.4 in) H 75.4 mm (2.97 in) W 8.8 mm (0.35 in) D; Ace Racing: 164.3 mm (6.47 in) H 75.8 mm (2.98 in) W 8.7 mm (0.34 in) D
- Weight: Ace: 186 g (6.6 oz); Ace Pro: 203.3 g (7.17 oz); Ace Racing: 205 g (7.2 oz)
- Operating system: original Android 12 with ColorOS 12.1 current: Android 13 with ColorOS 13.0
- System-on-chip: Ace/Racing: MediaTek Dimensity 8100-Max (5 nm); Ace Pro: Qualcomm Snapdragon 8+ Gen 1 (4 nm)
- CPU: Ace/Racing: Octa-core (4x2.85 GHz Cortex-A78 & 4x2.0 GHz Cortex-A55); Ace Pro: Octa-core (1x3.19 GHz Cortex-X2 & 3x2.75 GHz Cortex-A710 & 4x1.80 GHz Cortex-A510)
- GPU: Ace/Racing: Mali-G610 MC6; Ace Pro: Adreno 730
- Memory: Ace 8 and 12 GB RAM Ace Pro 12 and 16 GB
- Storage: Ace 128, 256 and 512 GB UFS 3.1 Ace Pro 256 and 512 GB
- Removable storage: None
- SIM: Dual SIM (Nano-SIM, dual stand-by)
- Battery: Ace Li-Po 4500 mAh, Ace Pro 4800 mAh
- Charging: Fast charging 150 W
- Rear camera: Ace/Pro: 50 MP, f/1.9, 24 mm (wide), 1/1.56", 1.0µm, PDAF, OIS; 8 MP, f/2.2, 15 mm, 120˚ (ultrawide), 1/4.0", 1.12µm; 2 MP, f/2.4, (macro); Ace Racing: 64 MP, f/1.7, 25 mm (wide), PDAF; 8 MP, f/2.2, 15 mm, 119˚ (ultrawide), 1/4.0", 1.12µm; 2 MP, f/2.4, (macro); All: LED flash, HDR, panorama; 4K@30/60 fps, 1080p@30/60/240 fps, gyro-EIS
- Front camera: 16 MP, f/2.4, 26 mm (wide), 1/3.09", 1.0µm; 1080p@30 fps, gyro-EIS
- Display: 6.7 in (170 mm); OLED, FHD+, 1B colors, 120Hz refresh rate, HDR10+, 500 nits (typ), 800 nits (HBM), 950 nits (peak); 1080 x 2412 px resolution, 20:9 ratio (~394 ppi density); Corning Gorilla Glass 5
- Sound: Stereo speakers
- Connectivity: Wi-Fi 802.11 a/b/g/n/ac/6, dual-band, Wi-Fi Direct; Bluetooth 5.2, A2DP, LE
- Data inputs: Multi-touch screen; USB Type-C 2.0; Fingerprint scanner (under display, optical); Accelerometer; Gyroscope; Proximity sensor; Compass; Color spectrum
- Model: PGKM10 (10R), PGP110 (10T)

The OnePlus Ace is a series of Android-based smartphones manufactured by OnePlus. OnePlus Ace was unveiled on April 21, 2022, OnePlus Ace Pro was unveiled on August 9, 2022, and OnePlus Ace Racing was unveiled on May 17, 2022.

== Design ==
The front of the OnePlus Ace and Ace Pro is protected by Corning Gorilla Glass 5, while the OnePlus Ace Racing features an unspecified glass. The back of the OnePlus Ace and Ace Racing is made of plastic, on the other hand the back of the OnePlus Ace Pro is made of glass. All three models feature a plastic frame.

The back design of the OnePlus Ace Racing and Ace Pro is similar to OnePlus 10 Pro.

== International variants ==
The OnePlus Ace is confirmed to be the Chinese version of the OnePlus 10R with identical specs. The OnePlus Ace Pro also has identical specs to the OnePlus 10T and it is possible to change from one version to the other through first unlocking the phone and then flashing the firmware.

== Specifications ==
=== Hardware ===
==== Display ====
The OnePlus Ace Pro features a 6.7-inch FHD+ AMOLED display with a resolution of 2400 x 1080 and a variable refresh rate up to a maximum 120 Hz. The display also has HDR10+ support and a peak brightness of 950 nits.

==== Performance ====
The OnePlus Ace has a MediaTek Dimensity 8100-Max CPU, meanwhile the OnePlus Ace Pro is equipped with a Qualcomm Snapdragon 8+ Gen 1. The OnePlus Pro has three memory configurations: 8 GB RAM and 128 GB memory, 12 GB RAM and 256 GB memory, and 12 GB RAM and 512 GB memory. The OnePlus Ace Pro has three memory configurations: 12 GB RAM and 256 GB memory, 16 GB RAM and 256 GB memory, and 16 GB RAM and 512 GB memory. All memory is UFS 3.1. Both phones have 5G support and Wi-Fi 6 connectivity.

==== Connectivity ====
The OnePlus Ace and OnePlus Ace Pro have both 5G support and Wi-Fi 6 connectivity. They feature USB type-C 2.0 connector. Both Ace phones have NFC and Bluetooth 5.2.

==== Battery ====
The OnePlus Ace and One Plus Ace Pro feature non-removeable Li-Po batteries. The batteries are optimized with OnePlus's proprietary Warp Charge technology referred to as SUPERVOOC. The OnePlus Ace has a 4500 mAh battery and the OnePlus Ace Pro has a 4800 mAh battery. Finally, the OnePlus Ace Pro is compatible with the company's Warp Charge 30T fast charging technology and includes a 150 W charger.

==== Camera ====
The smartphones come with a triple camera setup on the rear that includes a 50 MP primary shooter with OIS, 8 MP ultra-wide-angle lens and 2 MP macro camera. It also features a 16 MP selfie shooter housed in the punch hole on the front. The primary camera can record up to 4K videos @60 fps and 1080p videos @60 fps. The AI feature on the OnePlus Ace Pro automatically adjusts settings depending on the subject. OnePlus has also provided Pro Mode and Nightscape mode to take pictures in low-light conditions.

=== Software ===
The OnePlus Ace and OnePlus Ace Pro feature ColorOS, parent company Oppo's custom UI. They were released with Android 12 and currently run on the Android 14 as of this date (10 August 2024). Users also have access to the company's own app store.
