= OnePlus 13R =

Android mid-range smartphone manufactured by OnePlus

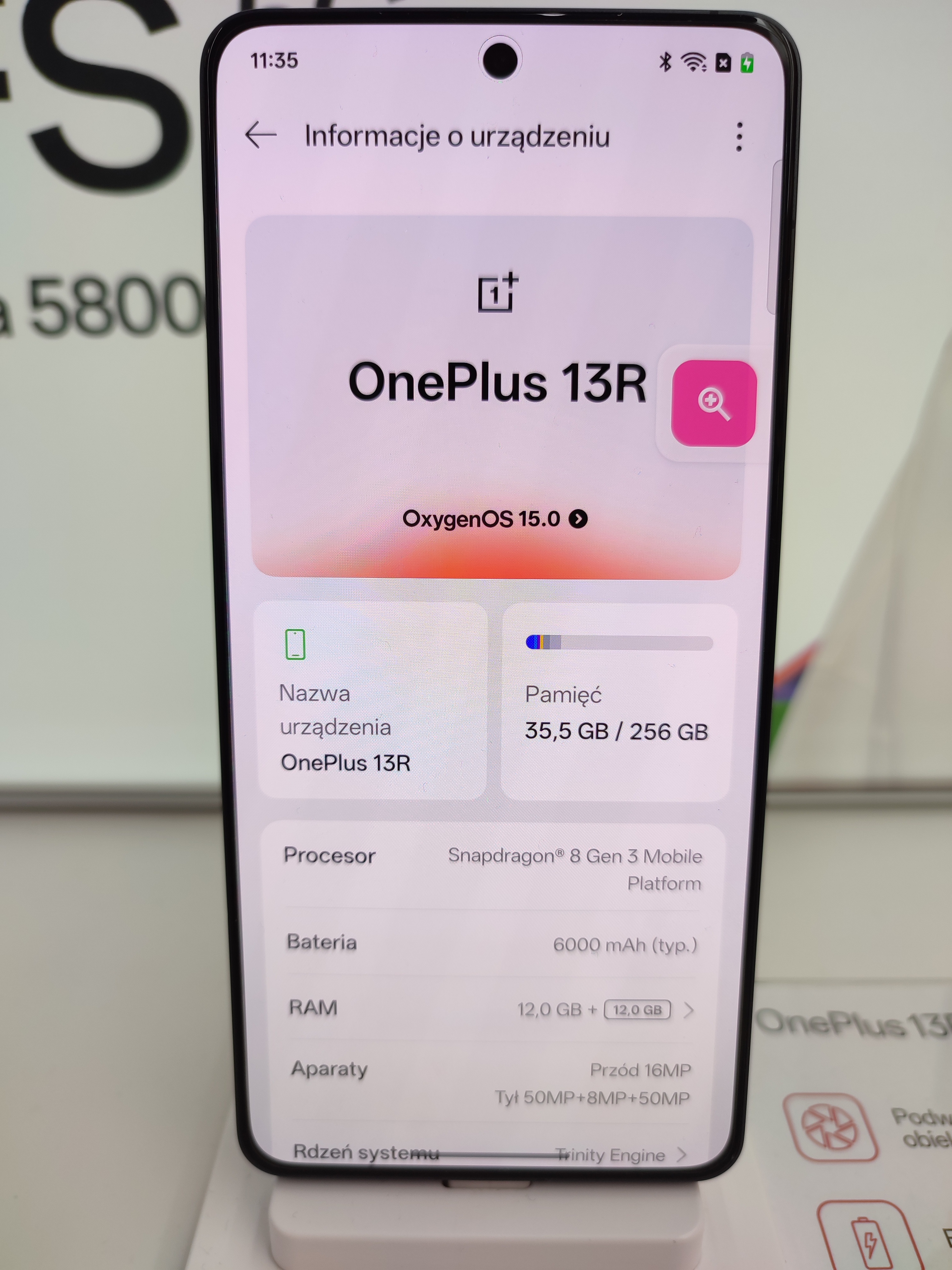
- Front panel of the OnePlus 13R
- Brand: OnePlus
- Developer: Hasselblad (camera)
- Manufacturer: Oppo (parent company)
- Type: Smartphone
- Series: OnePlus Ace / R series
- First released: January 14, 2025; 21 months ago
- Predecessor: OnePlus 12R
- Successor: OnePlus 15R
- Related: OnePlus Ace 5 OnePlus 13
- Compatible networks: GSM, CDMA, HSPA, LTE, 5G
- Form factor: Slate
- Colors: Astral Trail, Nebula Noir
- Dimensions: 161.7×75.8×8 mm (6.37×2.98×0.31 in)
- Weight: 206 g (7.3 oz)
- Operating system: Android 15 with OxygenOS 15
- System-on-chip: Qualcomm SM8650-AB Snapdragon 8 Gen 3 (4 nm)
- CPU: Octa-core (1x3.3 GHz Cortex-X4 & 3x3.2 GHz Cortex-A720 & 2x3.0 GHz Cortex-A720 & 2x2.3 GHz Cortex-A520)
- GPU: Adreno 750
- Memory: 12 GB (Europe and North America) or 16 GB RAM with built-in LPDDR5X (India)
- Storage: 256 GB or 512 GB UFS 4.0
- Removable storage: No
- SIM: Dual Nano-SIM / eSIM (market dependent)
- Battery: Li-Ion 6000 mAh
- Charging: 80W wired
- Rear camera: Triple: 50 MP, f/1.8 (wide), Sony LYT-700, OIS; 50 MP, f/2.0 (telephoto), S5KJN5, 2x optical zoom; 8 MP, f/2.2 (ultrawide), 112° FoV
- Front camera: 16 MP, f/2.4, 26mm (wide)
- Display: 6.78 in (172 mm) LTPO 4.1 AMOLED ProXDR Display, 1264 x 2780 pixels, 19.8:9 ratio (~450 ppi density), 120Hz, Dolby Vision, HDR10+
- Water resistance: IP65 dust tight and water resistant
- Model: CPH2645, CPH2691, CPH2647
- Website: www.oneplus.com/ph/13r

The OnePlus 13R is a mid-range, premium Android-based smartphone developed, designed, and marketed by Oppo under the brand OnePlus, with it co-developer Hasselblad. It was announced on January 7, 2025 and was released seven days later in that month.

The OnePlus 13R was succeeded by the OnePlus 15R in December 2025.

== Design and display ==
The frame and the back are made of aluminum integrated with a Corning Gorilla Glass 7i on front and rear sides. Its dimensions is 161.7 (h) × 75.8 (w) × 8 (d) mm and weights 206 grams, which is smaller and thinner than the OnePlus 12R and larger than Pixel 8a. It was available at Nebula Noir and Astral Trail color options.

In the front, the OnePlus 13R features a built-in AMOLED ProXDR Display layered on top of the AMOLED display with a resolution of 2780 × 1264 pixels, a variable 1Hz to 120Hz refresh rate, an aspect ratio of 19.8:9, and a 450 ppi pixel density. It also supports Display P3 and a and 10-bit color depth for display enhancement.

== Specifications ==
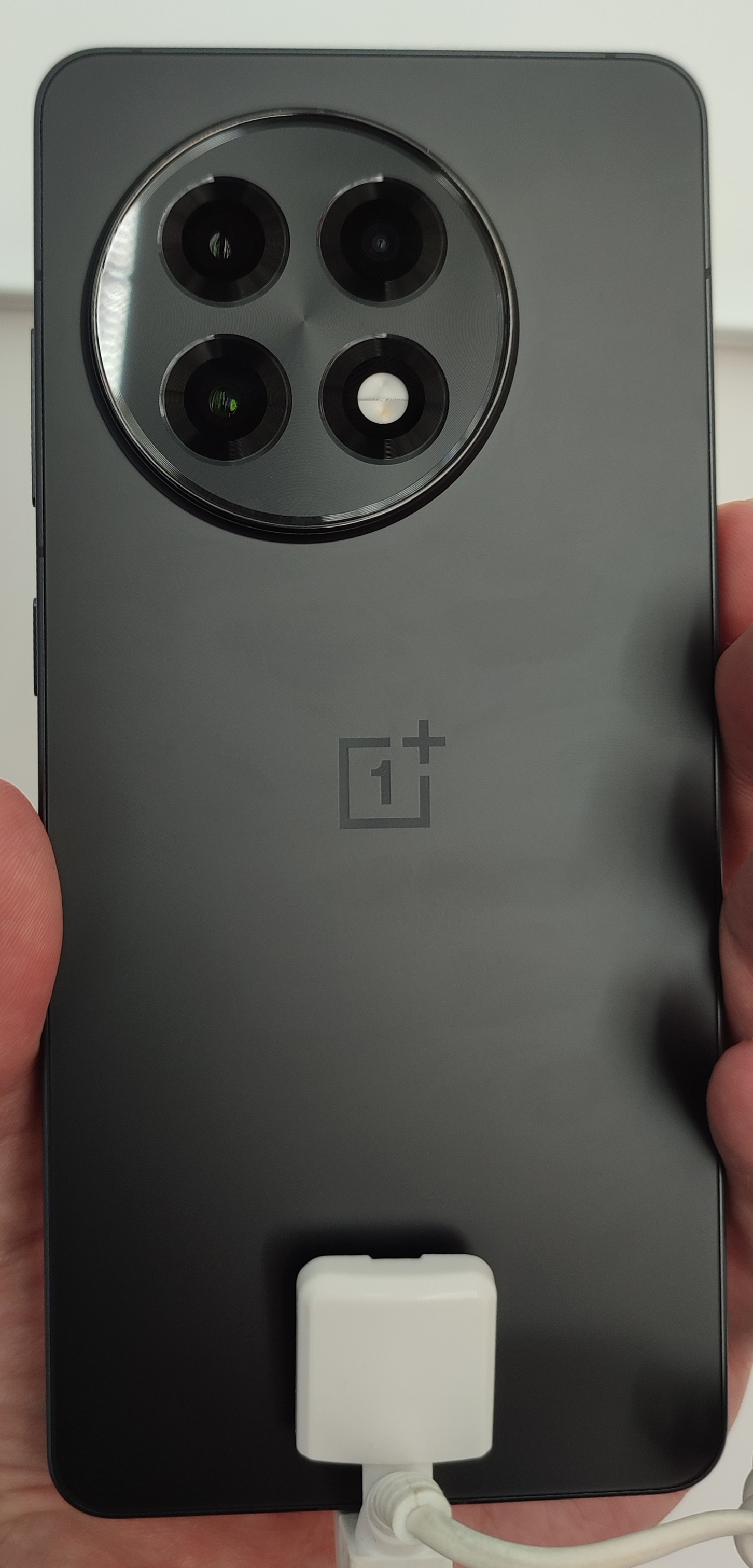
rear side of the OnePlus 13R

=== Hardware ===
The OnePlus 13R untilizes the high-end Qualcomm SM8650-AB Snapdragon 8 Gen 3 chipset integrated with a Kryo 980 CPU clocking at 3.3GHz and an Adreno 750 graphics processor clocking at 903MHz.

=== Camera and video ===
The camera module system was co-engineered by Hasselblad. It was integrated with a built-in Dual Exposure Algorithm that enhances photography, Clear Burst for simultaneous shots, and Action Mode for doubling capture speed and in fast-moving objects. The rear camera island consists of 3 lenses and 1 front-facing camera with the following configuration:

Camera Specs
Specification	Wide	Telephoto	Ultra-wide
Resolution in Megapixels	50MP		8MP
Field of view	84°	unspecified	112°
Aperture	f/1.8	f/2.0	f/2.2
Sensor	Sony LYT-700, 1/1.56"	S5KJN5, 1/2.75", includes 2x optical zoom	unspecified, sensor size is 1/4"
Pixel size	1.0 µm	0.64 µm	1.12 µm
Lens quantity	6P	5P	
OIS	Supported	✗ No OIS support	
EIS	All lenses support EIS		
Source: Specs from OnePlus Website

=== Memory ===
The OnePlus 13R comes with a 256GB or a 512GB internal memory configuration, with a RAM of either 12GB or 16GB. In European and North American models, it comes with 12GB of RAM while in Indian markets, it has 16GB of LPDDR5X RAM.

=== Battery and charging ===
Internally, the OnePlus 13R contains a 6,000 mAh li-ion non-removable battery and a SuperVOOC fast charging adapter up to 55W (North America) or 80W (International). It was claimed that it will take 57 minutes to complete a full charge.

=== Software ===
The OnePlus 13R was launched with Android 15 customized with OxygenOS 15 UI. It was scheduled up to 4 major Android upgrades as well and 6 security updates.

OS upgrade history for the OnePlus 13R
Pre-installed	1st	2nd	3rd	4th
Android 15 + OxygenOS 15	Android 16 + OxygenOS 16 November 2025			

== Reception ==
The crititcs receiving positive or mixed reviews for the phone. Android Police reviewer Stephen Radochia praised for its display, camera, battery, software, and the performance as well. Another reviewer—Aleksandar Anastasov, from PhoneArena—also praised for its display, stating that it "offers sharp visuals, smooth animations, and excellent color reproduction". However, it was criticized for the lack of wireless charging support.

=== Comparison with other phones ===
In contrasting and comparing with the Google Pixel 9a by Pocket-lint reviewer Sanuj Bhatia, the OnePlus 13R is canidated for its performance and termed as a "faster, smoother, and high-end all around smartphone", similar to the Galaxy S24 Ultra or the Galaxy Z Fold 6. Gizmochina compared with the iPhone 17, nonimating for its display technology.
