= OnePlus 12R =

2024 OnePlus smartphone

OnePlus 12R (OnePlus Ace 3 in China)
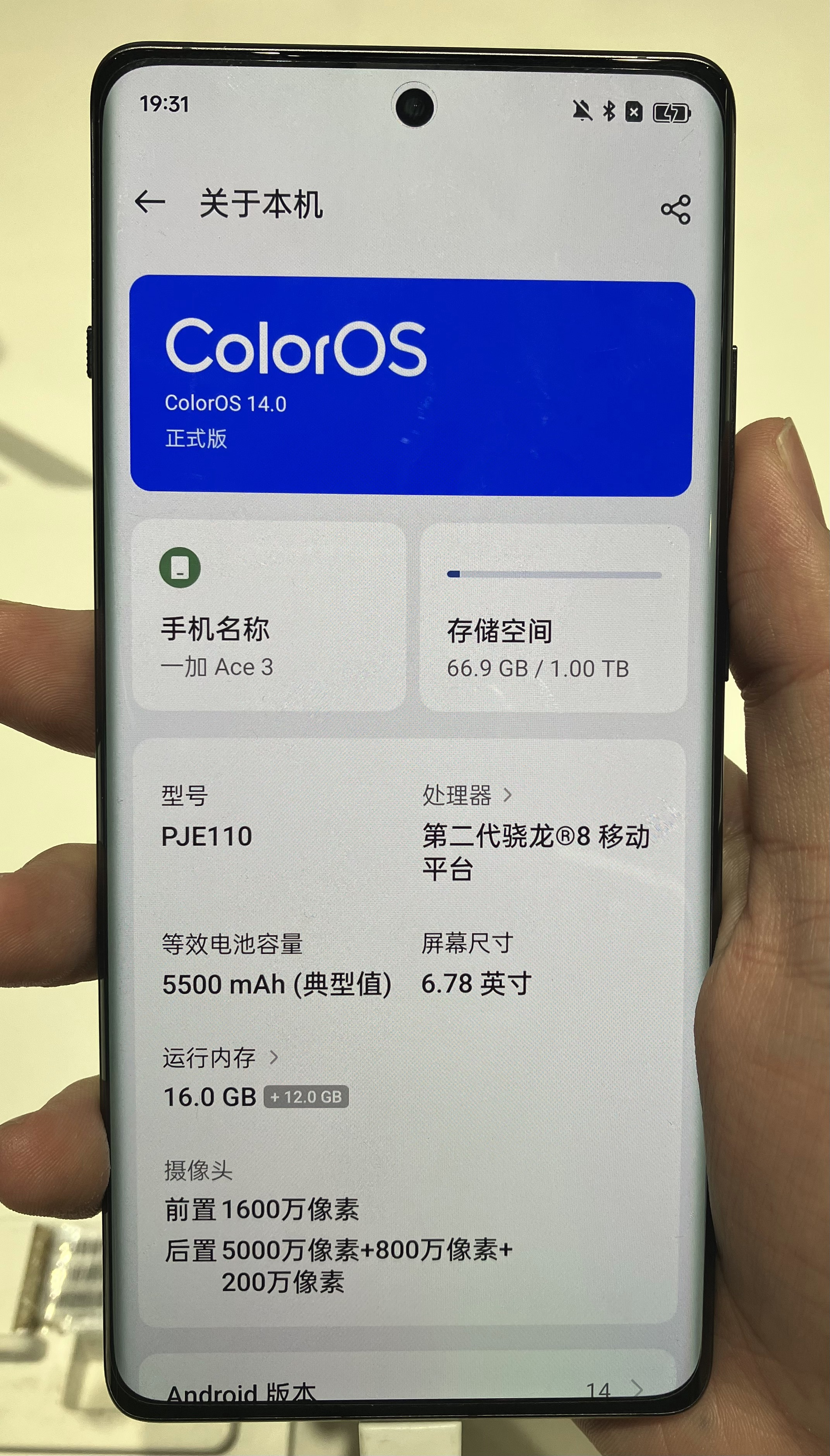
- The front of the OnePlus Ace 3 running ColorOS 14.0
- Manufacturer: OnePlus
- Type: Smartphone
- Series: Digital series/Ace
- First released: February 6, 2024; 2 years ago
- Predecessor: OnePlus 11R
- Related: OnePlus 12; OnePlus Ace 3 Pro; OnePlus Ace 3V
- Weight: 207 g (7.3 oz)
- Operating system: 12R: Original: Android 14, OxygenOS 14; Current: Android 15, OxygenOS 15; Ace 3: Original: Android 14, ColorOS 14; Current: Android 15, ColorOS 15
- CPU: Octa-core (1x3.2 GHz Cortex-X3 & 2x2.8 GHz Cortex-A715 & 2x2.8 GHz Cortex-A710 & 3x2.0 GHz Cortex-A510)
- GPU: Adreno 740
- Memory: 12R: 8 GB, 12 GB and 16 GB; Ace 3: 12 GB and 16 GB
- Storage: 12R: 128 GB and 256 GB; Ace 3: 256 GB, 512 GB and 1 TB
- SIM: Dual SIM (Nano-SIM, dual stand-by)
- Battery: 5500 mAh, non-removable
- Charging: 100W wired
- Rear camera: Triple-Camera Setup; Primary: Sony IMX 890; 50 MP, f/1.8, 24mm, 1/1.56", 1.0μm, multi-directional PDAF, OIS; Ultrawide: Sony IMX 355; 8 MP, f/2.2, 16mm, FoV 112˚, 1/4.0", 1.12μm, fixed focus; Macro: OmniVision OV02B; 2 MP, f/2.4, 22mm, 1/5.0", 1.75μm, fixed focus; Features: Laser AF, color spectrum sensor, LED flash, HDR, panorama; Video: 4K@30/60fps, 1080p@30/60/120/240fps, gyro-EIS, OIS
- Front camera: Samsung ISOCELL S5K3P9; 16 MP, f/2.4, 24mm (wide), 1/3.0", 1.0μm; Features: HDR, panorama; Video: 1080p@30fps, gyro-EIS
- Model: 12R: CPH2585, CPH2609, CPH2611; Ace 3: PJE110
- Codename: Aston
- Website: www.oneplus.in/12r

The OnePlus 12R is an Android-based smartphone manufactured by Chinese company OnePlus. It was announced on January 23, 2024 and released on February 6, 2024. It is the successor of the OnePlus 11R and it features the Qualcomm Snapdragon 8 Gen 2 chipset, the LTPO4 AMOLED display, and the 100W wired charging.

== Specifications ==
=== Design ===
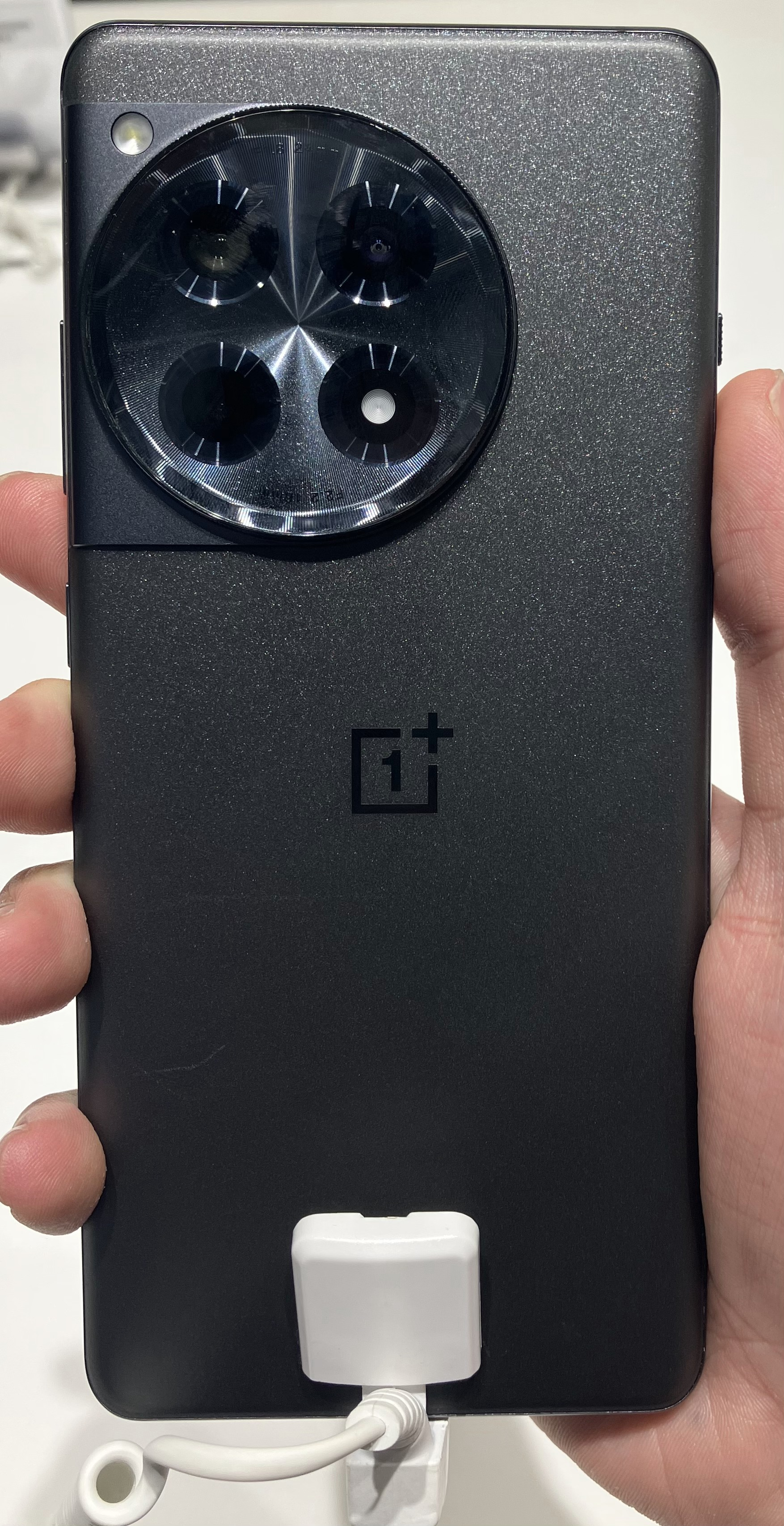
The back of the OnePlus Ace 3 in black

The OnePlus 12R has a glass front with an aluminum frame. The front glass panel is made using Corning Gorilla Glass Victus 2, which is claimed by Corning to be the strongest in their lineup. The back glass has a matte finish and comes in two colors: Iron Gray and Cool Blue. The device has an IP64 rating, which means it is waterproof and dustproof. The device measures 163.3 x 75.3 x 8.8 mm and weighs 207 g. It supports dual SIM (Nano-SIM, dual stand-by).

=== Display ===
The OnePlus 12R features a 6.78-inch LTPO4 AMOLED display with a resolution of 1264 x 2780 pixels and a pixel density of 450 ppi. The display supports 1 billion colors, 120 Hz refresh rate, HDR10+, Dolby Vision, and a peak brightness of 4500 nits. The display also has an under-display optical fingerprint scanner and a punch-hole cutout for the selfie camera.

=== Hardware ===
The OnePlus 12R is powered by the Qualcomm Snapdragon 8 Gen 2 chipset, which is based on a 4 nm process and has an octa-core CPU and an Adreno 740 GPU. The CPU consists of one Cortex-X3 core clocked at 3.2 GHz, two Cortex-A715 cores clocked at 2.8 GHz, two Cortex-A710 cores clocked at 2.8 GHz, and three Cortex-A510 cores clocked at 2.0 GHz. The device has 8 GB or 16 GB of RAM and 128 GB or 256 GB of internal storage. The storage is based on UFS 3.1 for both 128 GB and 256GB variants. The device does not have a microSD card slot.

=== Camera ===
The OnePlus 12R has a triple camera setup on the back and a single camera on the front. The main camera is a 50 MP sensor with an f/1.8 aperture, a 24 mm focal length, a 1/1.56-inch sensor size, a 1.0 μm pixel size, phase detection autofocus, laser autofocus, and optical image stabilization. The secondary camera is an 8 MP sensor with an f/2.2 aperture, a 16 mm focal length, a 112-degree field of view, a 1/4.0-inch sensor size, and a 1.12 μm pixel size. This camera is used for ultra-wide-angle shots. The tertiary camera is a 2 MP sensor with an f/2.4 aperture and is used for macro shots. The rear cameras support LED flash, HDR, panorama, and 4K video recording at 30 or 60 fps and 1080p video recording at 30, 60, 120, or 240 fps. The rear cameras also have gyro-EIS and OIS for video stabilization.

The front camera is a 16 MP sensor with an f/2.4 aperture, a 26 mm focal length, a 1/3-inch sensor size, and a 1.0 μm pixel size. The front camera supports HDR, panorama, and 1080p video recording at 30 fps. The front camera also has gyro-EIS for video stabilization.

=== Sound ===
The OnePlus 12R has stereo speakers with Dolby Atmos support. The device does not have a 3.5 mm headphone jack, but it supports Bluetooth 5.3 with A2DP, LE, and aptX HD codecs. The device also has an infrared port for remote control functionality.

=== Connectivity ===
The OnePlus 12R supports GSM, UMTS, HSPA, LTE, and 5G network technologies. The device also supports Wi-Fi 802.11 a/b/g/n/ac/6/7, dual-band, GPS, GALILEO, GLONASS, BDS, QZSS, and NFC. The device has a USB Type-C 2.0 port for data transfer and charging.

=== Battery ===
The OnePlus 12R has a non-removable 5500 mAh battery that supports 100W wired charging. The device can be charged from 1% to 100% in 26 minutes, as advertised by the company.

=== Software ===
The OnePlus 12R runs on Android 14 with OxygenOS 14 as the custom user interface. OxygenOS 14 offers various features such as Dark Mode, Zen Mode, Always On Display, Game Mode, Screen Recorder, Parallel Apps, App Locker, and more.

== Controversy ==
OnePlus had initially advertised that the 256 GB variant of phone comes with a flash storage of UFS 4.0 against the 128 GB variant which comes with UFS 3.1. However, some early buyers found the flash storage in 256 GB variant to be UFS 3.1 rather than claimed UFS 4.0. The company responded by apologising to buyers for miscommunication and called it an error on its part. It further offered a full refund to its initial buyers who wished to return the phone after this controversy came to light.

== Critical response ==
GSMArena rated the phone 4.1 out of 5, praising its battery life, camera and display. CNET gave it 8 out of 10 and called it an affordable alternative to OnePlus 12. The Mint praised the phone's performance designating it a flagship killer.
