= Oppo Find N6 =

Foldable Android smartphone

OPPO Find N6
- Brand: OPPO
- Manufacturer: OPPO
- Type: Foldable smartphone
- Series: OPPO Find N series
- First released: March 2026
- Predecessor: OPPO Find N5
- Related: OPPO Find X9 Series
- Compatible networks: 2G / 3G / 4G LTE / 5G
- Form factor: Book-style foldable
- Dimensions: Folded: 159.87 × 74.12 × 8.93 mm Open: 159.87 × 145.58 × 4.21 mm
- Weight: 225 g (8 oz)
- Operating system: ColorOS 16
- System-on-chip: Snapdragon 8 Elite Gen 5 Mobile Platform
- CPU: 7-core CPU
- GPU: Adreno 840
- Memory: 16 GB RAM
- Storage: 512 GB
- Removable storage: None
- SIM: Nano-SIM, Nano-USIM, eSIM
- Battery: 6000 mAh (typical); 5850 mAh (rated)
- Charging: 80W SUPERVOOC; 50W AIRVOOC
- Rear camera: 200 MP wide 50 MP telephoto 50 MP ultrawide 2 MP monochrome
- Front camera: 20 MP inner display camera 20 MP cover display camera
- Display: Inner display: 8.12 in QXGA+ (2480 × 2248); Cover display: 6.62 in FHD+ (2616 × 1140)
- Sound: USB Type-C audio
- Connectivity: Wi-Fi 5/6/7; Bluetooth 6.0; NFC
- Water resistance: IP56 / IP58 / IP59
- Model: CPH2765
- Website: www.oppo.com/en/smartphones/series-find-n/find-n6/

The OPPO Find N6 is a foldable Android smartphone developed by OPPO. It was released globally in March 2026 as the successor to the Find N5. The device introduced several hardware and design changes compared to its predecessor, including a thinner form factor, a less visible display crease, and a 6000mAh silicon carbon battery. The smartphone also features a 200 megapixel camera system developed in collaboration with Hasselblad.

== Specifications ==
=== Design ===
The OPPO Find N6 adopts a book style foldable design with an aviation grade aluminum alloy frame, a glass rear panel, and a second generation titanium alloy hinge. The cover display is protected by Ultra Thin Nanocrystal Glass, marketed by the company as Ceramic Guard. According to OPPO, the material was developed to improve resistance to drops and punctures while maintaining a slim profile.

The hinge mechanism is manufactured using a 3D liquid printing process, which the company described as an industry first intended to reduce microscopic surface irregularities. OPPO also incorporated a self healing flexible glass layer beneath the inner display to reduce the visibility of the screen crease during regular use. The company stated that the design received TÜV Rheinland’s “Minimised Crease” certification.

When folded, the device measures less than 9 mm in thickness and weighs 225 grams. The smartphone carries IP56, IP58, and IP59 ratings for water and dust resistance. The Find N6 was released in two color variants: Stellar Titanium and Blossom Orange.

=== Hardware ===
The Find N6 is powered by the Snapdragon 8 Elite Gen 5 Mobile Platform, a 3nm 7-core processor featuring Qualcomm's Oryon architecture. This is paired with an Adreno 840 GPU clocked at 1200MHz, with system performance managed by OPPO's Trinity Engine. Memory and storage specifications include 16GB of LPDDR5X RAM and 512GB of UFS 4.1 ROM.

=== Cameras ===
The OPPO Find N6 features a camera system developed in collaboration with Hasselblad, incorporating a multispectral sensor intended to improve color accuracy and image detail reproduction.

The primary rear camera consists of a 200 megapixel wide angle sensor with a 1/1.56 inch sensor size, a 23 mm focal length, an f/1.8 aperture, and optical image stabilization (OIS). The device also includes a 50 megapixel ultra wide angle camera with a 15 mm focal length, an f/2.0 aperture, and a 120 degree field of view.

The telephoto system includes a 50 megapixel periscope camera with a 70 mm focal length, an f/2.7 aperture, and optical image stabilization. The camera supports up to 120× digital zoom and is also used for macro photography. An additional 2 megapixel monochrome sensor is included as part of the rear camera array.

Both the inner foldable display and the outer cover display include 20 megapixel front facing cameras with a 91 degree field of view.

The camera software includes several photography modes, including Hasselblad XPAN mode, Hasselblad Portrait mode, AI Portrait Glow, and Hasselblad Hi Res mode, which supports image capture at both 50 megapixel and 200 megapixel resolutions. Video recording features include 4K recording with Dolby Vision support at up to 120 frames per second.

The device also supports FlexForm Camera functionality, allowing the foldable design to hold partially folded positions for hands free photography and video recording.

=== Connectivity ===
The device includes advanced network features powered by AI LinkBoost and a dedicated NetworkBoost Chip S1 to optimize signal strength in fold-scenarios. It supports Wi-Fi 7 (802.11be), Bluetooth 6.0 (including LDAC and LHDC 5.0 audio codecs), NFC, and an extensive range of 5G NR bands.
