= Oppo Find X7 =

2024 Android-based smartphones produced by Oppo

Oppo Find X7 Oppo Find X7 Ultra
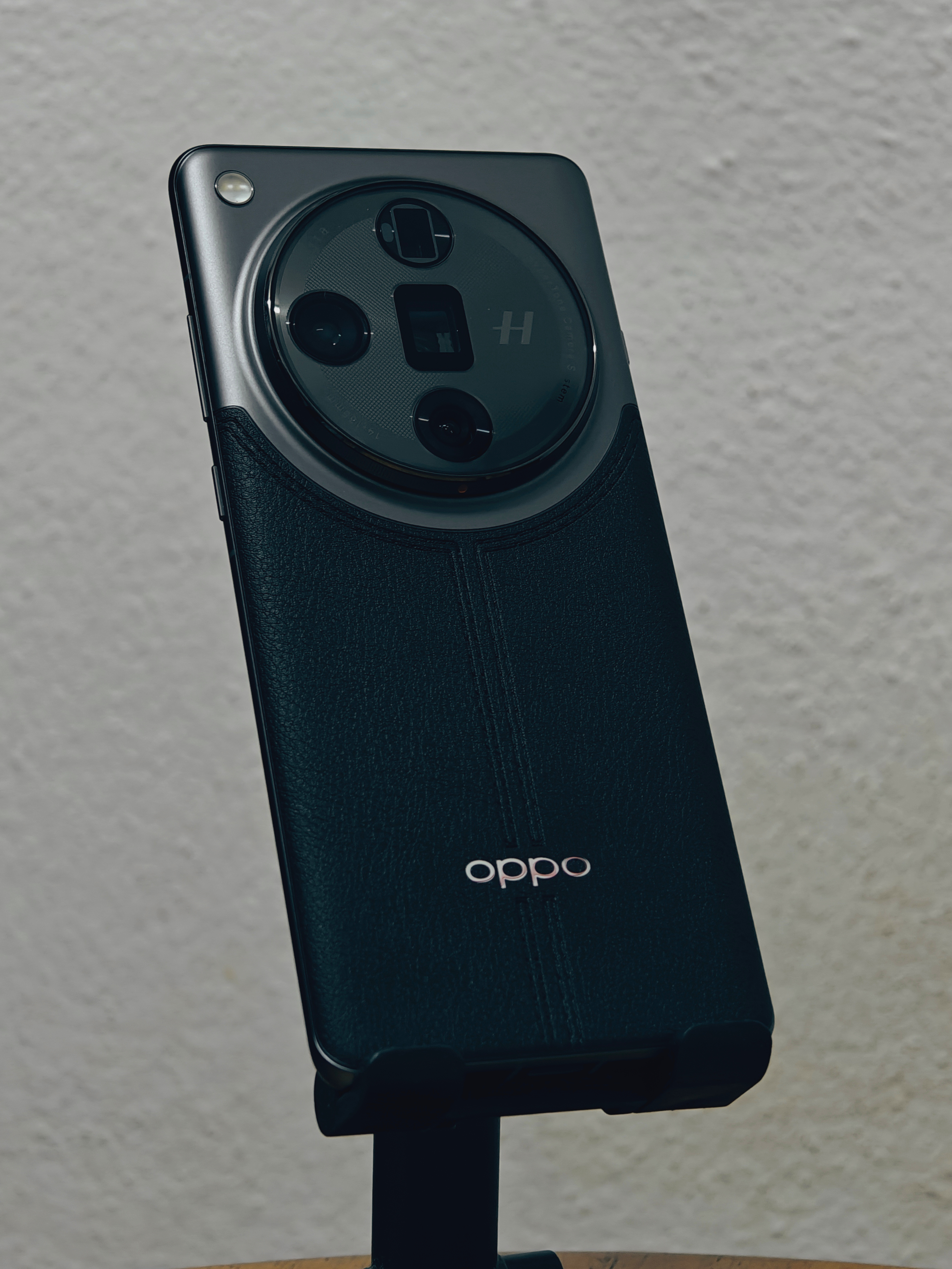
- Tailored Black variant of the Oppo Find X7 Ultra
- Brand: Oppo
- Manufacturer: Oppo
- Type: Phablet
- Series: Oppo Find X series
- First released: January 8, 2024; 2 years ago
- Availability by region: China January 8, 2024
- Predecessor: Oppo Find X6
- Successor: Oppo Find X8
- Related: OnePlus 12
- Compatible networks: 2G / 3G / 4G LTE / 5G
- Form factor: Slate
- Colors: Find X7: Black, Ocean Blue, Sepia Brown, Purple; Find X7 Ultra: Ocean Blue, Sepia Brown, Tailored Black
- Dimensions: Find X7: 162.7 mm × 75.4 mm × 9 mm (6.41 in × 2.97 in × 0.35 in); Find X7 Ultra: 164.3 mm × 76.2 mm × 9.5 mm (6.47 in × 3.00 in × 0.37 in)
- Weight: Find X7: 206 g (7.3 oz); Find X7 Ultra: 221 g (7.8 oz) or 218 g (7.7 oz)
- Operating system: ColorOS 14 (based on Android 14)
- System-on-chip: Find X7: MediaTek Dimensity 9300; Find X7 Ultra: Qualcomm Snapdragon 8 Gen 3
- CPU: Octa-core, Find X7: (1x3.25 GHz Cortex-X4, 3x2.85 GHz Cortex-X4, 4x2.0 GHz Cortex-A720); Find X7 Ultra: (1x3.3 GHz Cortex-X4, 5x3.2 GHz Cortex-A720, 2x2.3 GHz Cortex-A520)
- GPU: Find X7: Immortalis-G720 MC12; Find X7 Ultra: Adreno 750
- Memory: 12 or 16 GB RAM LPDDR5X
- Storage: Find X7: 256 GB, 512 GB or 1 TB UFS 4.0; Find X7 Ultra: 256 or 512 GB UFS 4.0
- Removable storage: None
- SIM: Nano-SIM
- Battery: 5000 mAh
- Charging: SuperVOOC technology
- Rear camera: Find X7: 50 MP, f/1.6, 23 mm, 1/1.56" (wide) + 50 MP, f/2.0, 15 mm (ultrawide) + 64 MP, f/2.6, 70 mm, 1/2.0" (telephoto), 3x optical zoom, omnidirectional PDAF, OIS, gyro-EIS, dual-LED flash, Auto HDR, 4K@30/60 fps, 1080p@30/60/240 fps Find X7 Ultra: 50 MP, f/1.8, 23 mm, 1.0"-type, 1.6 μm (wide) + 50 MP, f/2.0, 1/1.95", 1.0 μm (ultrawide) + 50 MP (telephoto), f/2.6, 65 mm, 1/1.56" (telephoto), 2.8x optical zoom + 50 MP, f/4.3, 1/1.95", 1.0 μm (ultrawide) + 50 MP (telephoto), f/4.3, 135 mm, 1/2.51" (telephoto), 6x optical zoom omnidirectional PDAF, OIS, gyro-EIS, dual-LED flash, Auto HDR, 4K@30/60 fps, 1080p@30/60/240 fps
- Front camera: 32 MP, f/2.4, 21 mm, 1/2.74", 0.8 μm, 4K@30 fps (Find X7), 4K@60 fps (Find X7 Ultra), HDR
- Display: Find X7: 6.78 in (172 mm) LTPO AMOLED capacitive touchscreen, 2780 × 1274, (450 ppi with 91.1% screen-to-body ratio), 120 Hz refresh rate, 1B colors, HDR10+ Find X7 Ultra: 6.82 in (173 mm) LTPO AMOLED capacitive touchscreen, 3168 × 1440 1440p, (510 ppi with 90.3% screen-to-body ratio), 120 Hz refresh rate, 1B colors, HDR10+
- Sound: Dolby Atmos stereo speakers with active noise cancellation and Active Privacy Protection for Voice Call
- Connectivity: Wi-Fi a/b/g/n/ac/6e/7; Bluetooth 5.4, A2DP, LE, aptX HD, LHDC
- Data inputs: Fingerprint scanner (optical); Accelerometer; gyroscope; proximity sensor; electronic compass; Colour spectrum sensor
- Model: PHZ110 (Find X7); PHY110 (Find X7 Ultra)
- Website: www.oppo.com/cn/smartphones/series-find-x/find-x7-ultra/

The Oppo Find X7 is a series of two Android-based smartphones manufactured by Oppo as part of its flagship Find X series. Unveiled as successors to the Oppo Find X6 series, both phones were launched on 8 January 2024. Just like its predecessor, the Find X6 series, the Find X7 series were released exclusively for the mainland Chinese market.

== Line-up ==
The Find X7 series consists of two devices — the regular Find X7 and the top of the line Find X7 Ultra. As the first “Ultra” phone in the flagship Find X series, the Find X7 Ultra is also being touted as the first phone to incorporate two periscope telephoto cameras.

== Design ==
Both the Find X7 and the Find X7 Ultra feature curved displays and aluminium frames. The Find X7 features a curved 6.78 in (172 mm) display, while the Find X7 Ultra has a slightly larger 6.82 in (173 mm) screen with a higher 1440p resolution. Both display systems are 10-bit HDR10+ capable. The Find X7 is IP65 protected, while the Find X7 Ultra features IP68 water and dust resistance.

The Find X7 smartphone is available in four different colour options, namely Black, Ocean Blue, Sepia Brown and Purple. The Black and Purple variants have all-glass back panels, while the Ocean Blue and Sepia Brown colour options come with dual-tone glass and vegan leather design. The Find X7 Ultra is available in Ocean Blue, Sepia Brown and Tailored Black colourways, all of which feature similar dual-tone glass and leather backs.

The Find X7 series is the first within Oppo's Find X line-up to introduce an alert slider, a design copied from the company's subsidiary OnePlus.

== Specifications ==
=== Hardware ===
The Find X7 is powered by MediaTek Dimensity 9300 and operates on a 1×3.25 GHz Cortex-X4, 3×2.85 GHz Cortex-X4 and 4×2.0 GHz Cortex-A720 octa-core system. The flagship Find X7 Ultra uses Snapdragon 8 Gen 3, the highest specced Snapdragon chip in 2024. It operates on a more advanced octa-core system comprising 1×3.3 GHz Cortex-X4, 5×3.2 GHz Cortex-A720 and 2×2.3 GHz Cortex-A520.

Both the Find X7 and the Find X7 Ultra offer UFS 4.0 without expandable storage and Dolby Atmos stereo speakers with active noise cancellation. Biometric options include an optical fingerprint scanner and facial recognition. While both phones come equipped with either 12 or 16 GB of RAM, the Find X7 is the only phone in the series to offer up to 1 TB of UFS4.0 flash memory, whereas the Find X7 Ultra has either 256 GB or 512 GB UFS 4.0 flash memory options.

=== Camera ===
The Find X7 has a triple camera setup consisting of a 50 MP main sensor, a 50 MP ultrawide sensor and a 64 MP periscope telephoto lens capable of 3x optical zoom.

The Find X7 Ultra incorporates a quad-camera setup comprising a 50 MP 1-inch type Sony LYT-900 main sensor, a 50 MP Sony LYT-600 ultrawide sensor, a 50 MP Sony IMX890 2.8x-periscope telephoto lens and a 50 MP Sony IMX858 6x-periscope telephoto lens. Oppo has claimed that the Find X7 Ultra's quad-camera system is capable of covering between 14 mm to 270 mm equivalent focal lengths.

Both the Find X7 and the Find X7 Ultra are equipped with a 32 MP front-facing camera capable of 4K selfie video resolution. GSMArena speculated that either a Sony IMX709 or LYT-506 sensor is used for the front-facing camera. The Find X7 series also features software-based tuning co-developed with Hasselblad, with built-in Hypertone Image Engine purportedly designed to enhance computational photography.

=== Software ===
The Find X7 and Find X7 Ultra run on ColorOS 14, which is based on Android 14.

== See also ==
- List of large sensor camera phones
