= Oppo Find X5 =

2022 Android-based smartphones produced by Oppo

Oppo Find X5 Oppo Find X5 Pro Oppo Find X5 Lite
- Brand: Oppo
- Manufacturer: Oppo
- Type: Phablet
- Predecessor: Oppo Find X3
- Successor: Oppo Find X6
- Related: OnePlus 10 Pro
- Compatible networks: 2G, 3G, 4G and 5G
- Form factor: Slate
- Dimensions: Find X5: 163.7 mm × 72.6 mm × 8.7 mm (6.44 in × 2.86 in × 0.34 in); Find X5 Pro: 163.7 mm × 73.9 mm × 8.5 mm (6.44 in × 2.91 in × 0.33 in); Find X5 Lite: 160.6 mm × 73.2 mm × 7.8 mm (6.32 in × 2.88 in × 0.31 in)
- Weight: Find X5: 196 g (6.9 oz); Find X5 Pro: 195 g (6.9 oz) or 218 g (7.7 oz); Find X5 Lite: 173 g (6.1 oz)
- Operating system: ColorOS 12.1 (based on Android 12)
- System-on-chip: Find X5: Qualcomm Snapdragon 888; Find X5 Pro Dimensity Edition: MediaTek Dimensity 9000; Find X5 Pro: Qualcomm Snapdragon 8 Gen 1; Find X5 Lite: MediaTek MT6877 Dimensity 900 (6 nm)
- CPU: Octa-core, Find X5: (1x 2.84 GHz Kryo 680 & 3x 2.42 GHz Kryo 680 & 4x 1.8 GHz Kryo 680); Find X5 Pro: (1x 3.0 GHz Cortex-X2 & 3x 2.5 GHz Cortex A710 & 4x 1.8 GHz Cortex A510); Find X5 Lite: Octa-core (2x2.4 GHz Cortex-A78 & 6x2.0 GHz Cortex-A55)
- GPU: Find X5: Adreno 660; Find X5 Pro: Adreno 730; Find X5 Lite: Mali-G68 MC4
- Memory: 8 or 12 GB LPDDR5 RAM
- Storage: Find X5: 128 GB or 256 GB UFS 3.1; Find X5 Pro: 128 GB, 256 GB or 512 GB UFS 3.1; Find X5 Lite: 256 GB
- Removable storage: None
- Battery: Find X5: 4800 mAh; Find X5 Pro: 5000 mAh; Find X5 Lite: 4500 mAh
- Charging: SuperVOOC technology
- Rear camera: Find X5/Find X5 Pro: 50 MP, f/1.8, 1/1.56", 1.0 μm (wide) + 50 MP, f/2.2, 1/1.56", 1.0 μm (ultrawide) + 13 MP (telephoto), 2x optical zoom, omnidirectional PDAF, OIS, gyro-EIS, dual-LED flash, Auto HDR, 4K@30/60 fps, 1080p@30/60/240 fps Find X5 Lite: 64 MP, f/1.7, 26mm (wide), 1/2.0", 0.7 μm, PDAF; 8 MP, f/2.3, 119˚ (ultrawide); 2 MP, f/2.4, (macro); LED flash, HDR, panorama 4K@30fps, 1080p@30/60/120fps, gyro-EIS
- Front camera: 32 MP, f/2.4, 26 mm, 1/2.8", 0.8 μm 1080p@30 fps, HDR
- Display: Find X5: 6.55 in (166 mm) AMOLED capacitive touchscreen, 2400 × 1080 1080p, (402 ppi with 20:9 aspect ratio), 120 Hz refresh rate, 1B colors, HDR10+ Find X5 Pro: 6.7 in (170 mm) LTPO2 AMOLED capacitive touchscreen, 3216 × 1440 1440p, (525 ppi with 20:9 aspect ratio), 120 Hz refresh rate, 1B colors, HDR10+ Find X5 Lite: 6.43 in (163 mm) LTPO2 AMOLED capacitive touchscreen, 2400 × 1080 1080p, (409 ppi with 20:9 aspect ratio), 90 Hz refresh rate, 1B colors, HDR10+
- Sound: Dolby Atmos stereo speakers with active noise cancellation
- Connectivity: Bluetooth 5.2; Wi-Fi a/b/g/n/ac/6e; A2DP, LE, aptX HD
- Data inputs: Fingerprint scanner (optical); Accelerometer; gyroscope; proximity sensor; electronic compass
- Website: www.oppo.com/en/smartphones/series-find-x/find-x5-pro/

Oppo Find X5 Series are Android-based smartphones manufactured by Oppo, succeeding the Find X3 Series. These phones were announced on 24 February 2022.

== Design ==
The Find X5 and Find X5 Pro use aluminium for the frame, while the display is protected by Corning Gorilla Glass Victus which is curved around the edges. The back panel is made from ceramic for the find X5 pro, and glass for the find X5, with a contoured camera protrusion housing three rear cameras and the dual-LED flash. The find x5 pro has IP68 water resistance unlike the find x5; colour options are Glaze Black and Ceramic White, Black and white respectively.

== Specifications ==
=== Hardware ===
The Find X5 and Find X5 Pro use the Snapdragon 888 and Snapdragon 8 Gen 1 processors respectively. Both devices offer UFS 3.1 with no expandable storage.The Find X5 has 128 GB or 256 GB paired with 8 GB or 12 GB of RAM, while the Find X5 Pro has 256 GB or 512 GB paired with 8 or 12 GB of RAM. Find X5 Pro has a 6.7-inch (170 mm) LTPO AMOLED display of 1440p resolution with an adaptive 120 Hz refresh rate. The display has HDR10+ support, and is capable of showing over 1 billion colours. The Find X5 has also the same screen but with no LTPO tech, a smaller 6.55" screen and only 1080p resolution. Find X5 and Find X5 Pro battery capacity is 4800 mAh and 5000 mAh respectively; wired fast charging is supported at 80 W, and wireless charging at 30 W and 50 W respectively. Both phones include Dolby Atmos stereo speakers with active noise cancellation, and has no audio jack. Biometric options include an optical fingerprint scanner and facial recognition.

==== Camera ====
The Find X5 and Find X5 Pro have identical camera hardware from Hasselblad and the MariSilicon X image processing CPU. The 50 MP Sony IMX766 is utilized for the wide and ultrawide sensors, featuring native 10-bit colour capture. The telephoto sensor has a 13 MP sensor with 2x optical zoom. A removed feature from the Find X3 series was a 3 MP microlens advertised with up to 60x magnification. The front camera remains unchanged, using a 32 MP sensor.

=== Software ===
The Find X5 and Find X5 Pro run on ColorOS 12.1, which is based on Android 12.
