= Oppo Find X6 =

2023 Android-based smartphones produced by Oppo

Oppo Find X6 Oppo Find X6 Pro
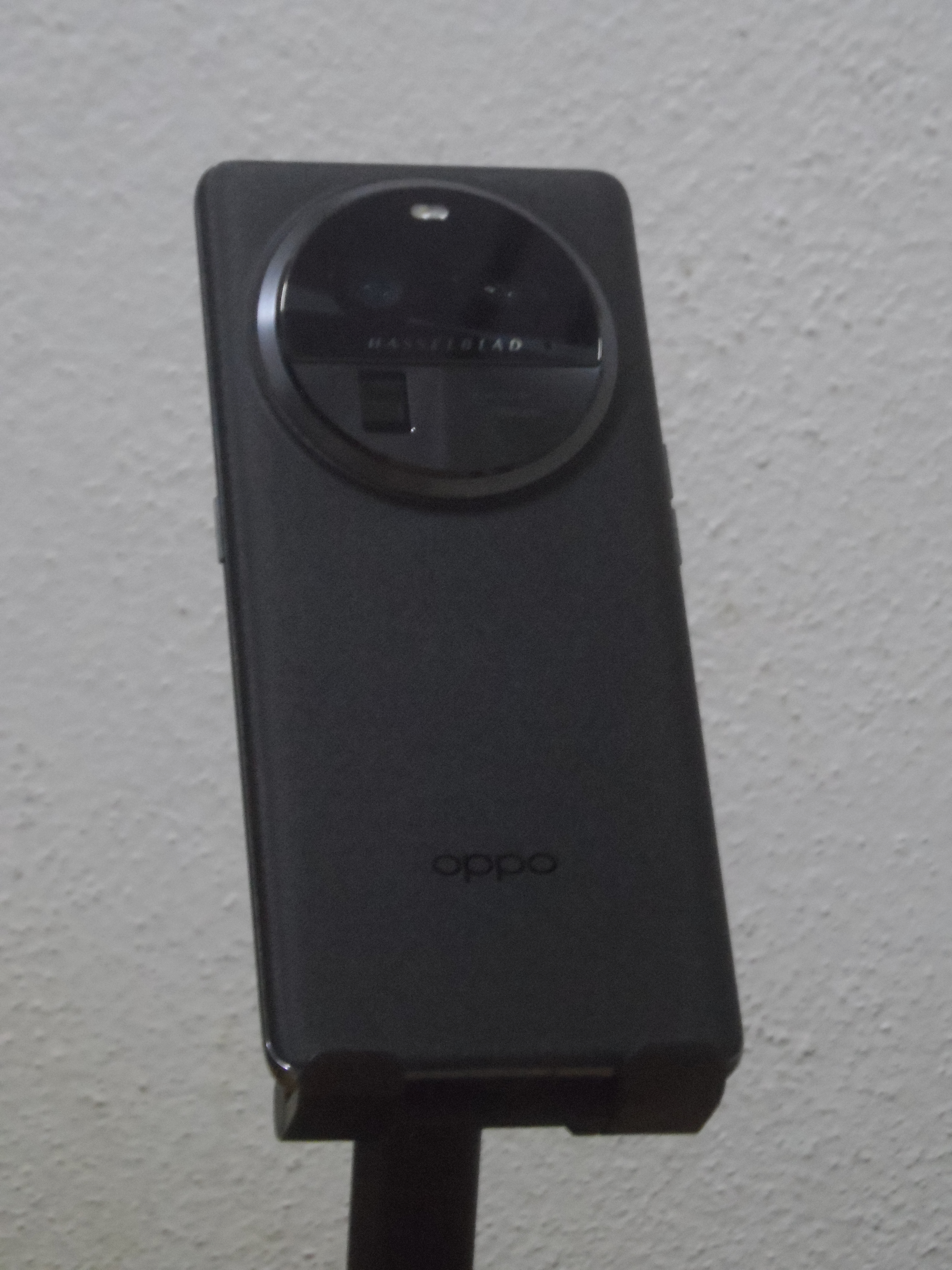
- Black variant of the Oppo Find X6 Pro
- Brand: Oppo
- Manufacturer: Oppo
- Type: Phablet
- Series: Oppo Find X series
- First released: March 21, 2023; 3 years ago
- Availability by region: China March 21, 2023
- Predecessor: Oppo Find X5
- Successor: Oppo Find X7
- Related: OnePlus 11
- Compatible networks: 2G / 3G / 4G LTE / 5G
- Form factor: Slate
- Colors: Find X6: Black, Green, Gold Find X6 Pro: Black, Green, Brown
- Dimensions: Find X6: 162.9 mm × 74.1 mm × 9 mm (6.41 in × 2.92 in × 0.35 in); Find X6 Pro: 164.8 mm × 76.2 mm × 9.5 mm (6.49 in × 3.00 in × 0.37 in)
- Weight: Find X6: 207 g (7.3 oz); Find X6 Pro: 218 g (7.7 oz) or 218 g (7.7 oz)
- Operating system: ColorOS 13.1 (based on Android 13)
- System-on-chip: Find X6: MediaTek Dimensity 9200; Find X6 Pro: Qualcomm Snapdragon 8 Gen 2
- CPU: Octa-core, Find X6: (1x3.05 GHz Cortex-X3 & 3x2.85 GHz Cortex-A715 & 4x1.80 GHz Cortex-A510); Find X6 Pro: (1x3.2 GHz Cortex-X3 & 2x2.8 GHz Cortex-A715 & 2x2.8 GHz Cortex-A710 & 3x2.0 GHz Cortex-A510)
- GPU: Find X6: Immortalis-G715 MC11; Find X6 Pro: Adreno 740
- Memory: 12 or 16 GB LPDDR5 RAM
- Storage: Find X6: 256 GB or 512 GB UFS 4.0; Find X6 Pro: 256 GB or 512 GB UFS 4.0
- Removable storage: None
- Battery: Find X6: 4800 mAh; Find X6 Pro: 5000 mAh
- Charging: SuperVOOC technology
- Rear camera: Find X6: 50 MP, f/1.8, 1/1.56", 1.0 μm (wide) + 50 MP, f/2.0, 1/2.76", 0.64 μm (ultrawide) + 50 MP (telephoto), 2.8x optical zoom, omnidirectional PDAF, OIS, gyro-EIS, dual-LED flash, Auto HDR, 4K@30/60 fps, 1080p@30/60/240 fps Find X6 Pro: 50 MP, f/1.8, 1.0", 1.6 μm (wide) + 50 MP, f/2.2, 1/1.56", 1.0 μm (ultrawide) + 50 MP (telephoto), 2.8x optical zoom, omnidirectional PDAF, OIS, gyro-EIS, dual-LED flash, Auto HDR, 4K@30/60 fps, 1080p@30/60/240 fps
- Front camera: Find X6: 32 MP, f/2.4, 21 mm, 1/2.74", 0.8 μm 1080p@30 fps, HDR; Find X6 Pro: 32 MP, f/2.4, 21 mm, 1/2.74", 0.8 μm 4K@30 fps, HDR
- Display: Find X6: 6.74 in (171 mm) AMOLED capacitive touchscreen, 2772 × 1240 1240p, (451 ppi with 20:9 aspect ratio), 120 Hz refresh rate, 1B colors, HDR10+ Find X6 Pro: 6.82 in (173 mm) LTPO2 AMOLED capacitive touchscreen, 3168 × 1440 1440p, (510 ppi with 19.8:9 aspect ratio), 120 Hz refresh rate, 1B colors, HDR10+
- Sound: Dolby Atmos stereo speakers with active noise cancellation and Active Privacy Protection for Voice Call
- Connectivity: Bluetooth 5.3; Wi-Fi a/b/g/n/ac/6/7; A2DP, LE, aptX HD
- Data inputs: Fingerprint scanner (optical); Accelerometer; gyroscope; proximity sensor; electronic compass; Colour spectrum sensor
- Model: PGEM110 (Find X6) PGEM10 (Find X6 Pro)
- Website: www.oppo.com/cn/smartphones/series-find-x/find-x6-pro/

The Oppo Find X6 is a series of two Android-based smartphones manufactured by Oppo as part of its flagship Find X series. Unveiled as successors to the Oppo Find X5 series, both phones were unveiled on 21 March 2023. Currently, the Find X6 series is available for sale only in mainland China.

== Lineup ==
The Find X6 series consists of two devices - the regular Find X6 and the top of the line Find X6 Pro.

The Find X6 features a curved 6.74 in (171 mm) display with a variable refresh rate from 40 Hz to 120 Hz, either 12 GB or 16GB of RAM, and storage options from 256 GB to 512 GB.

The Find X6 Pro flagship comes with a curved 6.82 in (173 mm) LTPO3 display that offers a variable refresh rate starting at 1 HZ and a higher 1440p resolution, either 12 GB or 16GB of RAM, and storage options from 256 GB to 512 GB. Both phones feature 10-bit HDR10+ capable displays, but the Find X6 Pro's battery capacity is the largest in the lineup and comes with upgraded cameras compared to the Find X6.

== Design ==
Both the Find X6 and the Find X6 Pro feature curved displays and aluminium frames. However, only the Find X6 Pro's screen is protected by Corning Gorilla Glass Victus 2.

The Find X6 comes in either Black, Green or Gold colourways. The Green and Gold variants were manufactured with Oppo's patented Oppo Glow process, while the Black variant features a mirrored glass rear. The Find X6 is also IP64 protected.

The more advanced Find X6 Pro features IP68 water and dust resistance. Its colour options are Black, Green and Brown, with the Brown variant being the only one that is uniquely crafted with a dual tone vegan leather and glass rear. The Black and Green variants are fitted with matte glass backs.

== Specifications ==
=== Hardware ===
The Find X6 is powered by MediaTek Dimensity 9200 and operates on Octa-core (1x3.05 GHz Cortex-X3 & 3x2.85 GHz Cortex-A715 & 4x1.80 GHz Cortex-A510), an upgrade from its predecessor the Find X5.

The flagship Find X6 Pro uses Snapdragon 8 Gen 2, the highest specced Snapdragon chip in 2023. It operates on a more advanced octa-core system (1x3.2 GHz Cortex-X3 & 2x2.8 GHz Cortex-A715 & 2x2.80 GHz Cortex-A710 & 3x2.0 GHz Cortex-A510).

Both the Find X6 and the Find X6 Pro offer UFS 4.0 without expandable storage, as well as 256 GB or 512 GB of ROM paired with either 12 or 16 GB of RAM. Both phones include Dolby Atmos stereo speakers with active noise cancellation, and have no audio jack. Biometric options include an optical fingerprint scanner and facial recognition.

=== Camera ===
While both the Find X6 and the Find X6 Pro are equipped with identical 32MP front-facing Sony IMX709 cameras, subsequent software updates have enabled the latter to shoot videos in 4K resolution.

The Find X6 has a slightly inferior rear camera setup, utilising the 50 MP Sony IMX890 as the main sensor and the 50 MP Isocell JN1 as the ultrawide sensor. The Sony IMX890 is also used as the periscope telephoto lens with 2.8x optical zoom and 6x hybrid zoom.

The Find X6 Pro, on the other hand, features the 1-inch type Sony IMX989 main sensor, while both the ultrawide and the 2.8x-periscope telephoto lens use the Sony IMX890, giving rise to the claim of having 'Three Main Cameras' that offer parity in image quality across focal lengths.

Both phones also feature software-based tuning co-developed with Hasselblad and the custom-made MariSilicon X image processing NPU.

In the end of 2023, it was the 8th best smartphone camera in the world according to DxOMark.

=== Battery ===
The Find X6 and Find X6 Pro's battery capacity are 4800 mAh and 5000 mAh respectively. The Find X6 supports up to 80 W wired charging, while the Find X6 Pro is capable of up to 100W wired charging. In addition, the Find X6 Pro supports 50W wireless charging, whereas the Find X6 misses out on wireless charging support.

Oppo claims that its proprietary battery technology allows the Find X6 series to retain 80% of their battery capacity after 1,600 charging cycles.

=== Software ===
The Find X6 and Find X6 Pro run on ColorOS 13.1, which is based on Android 13.

== See also ==
- List of large sensor camera phones
