= Oppo Find X8 =

2024/2025 Chinese Smartphone Series By OPPO

Oppo Find X8 Oppo Find X8 Pro Oppo Find X8 Ultra
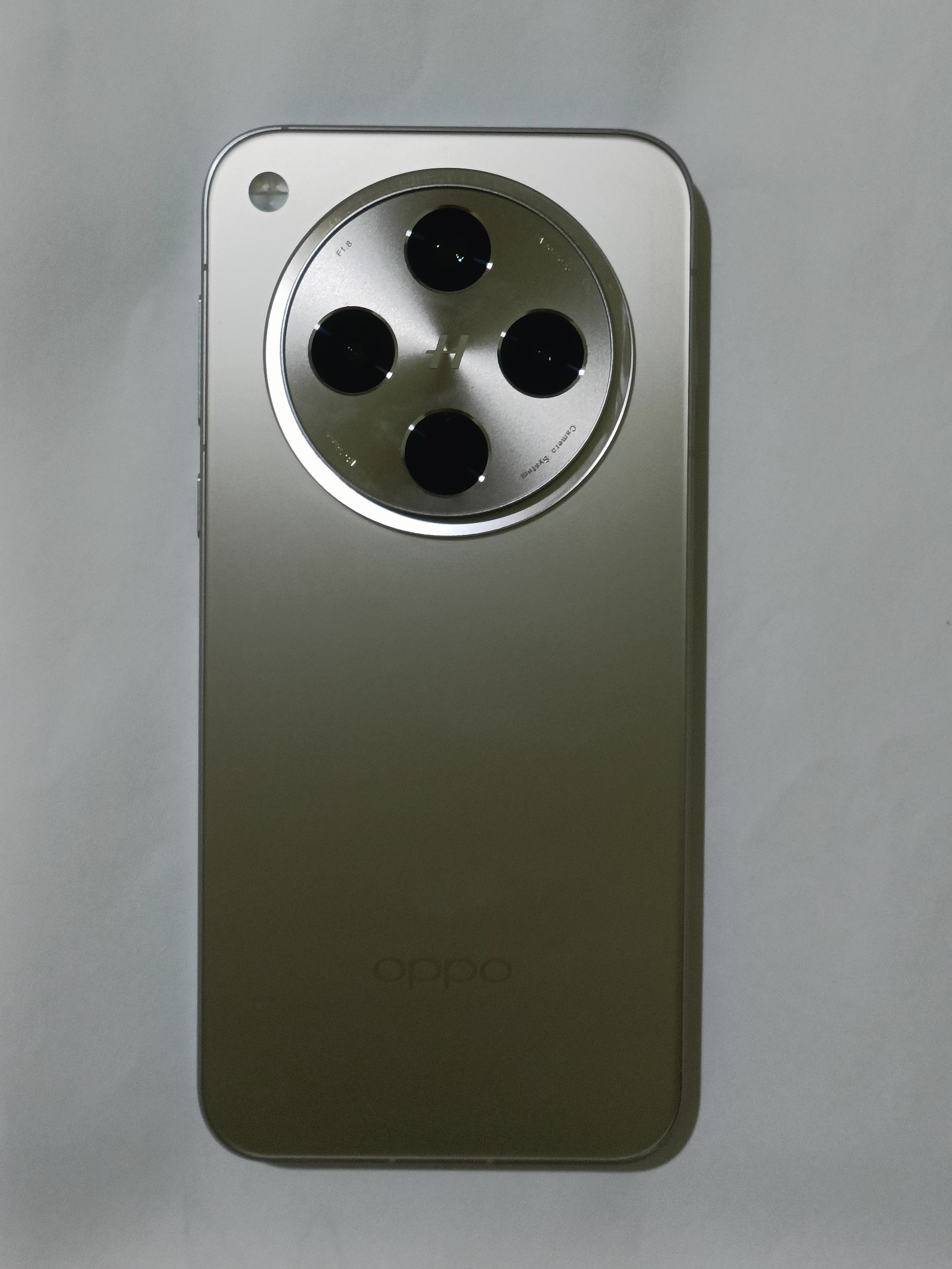
- Oppo Find X8 in Star Grey
- Brand: Oppo
- Manufacturer: Oppo
- Type: Phablet
- Series: Oppo Find X series
- First released: Find X8 / X8 Pro: October 30, 2024; 19 months ago; Find X8 Ultra: April 16, 2025; 14 months ago
- Predecessor: Oppo Find X7
- Successor: Oppo Find X9
- Compatible networks: 2G / 3G / 4G LTE / 5G
- Form factor: Slate
- Colors: Find X8: Star Grey; Space Black; Shell Pink; Find X8 Pro: Pearl White; Space Black; Find X8 Ultra: Morning Light (晨曦微光); Moonlight White (月光白); Starry Black (星野黑)
- Dimensions: Find X8: 157.4 mm × 74.3 mm × 7.9 mm (6.20 in × 2.93 in × 0.31 in); Find X8 Pro: 162.3 mm × 76.7 mm × 8.2 mm (6.39 in × 3.02 in × 0.32 in); Find X8 Ultra: 163.1 mm × 76.8 mm × 8.8 mm (6.42 in × 3.02 in × 0.35 in)
- Weight: Find X8: 193 g (6.8 oz); Find X8 Pro: 215 g (7.6 oz); Find X8 Ultra: 226 g (8.0 oz)
- Operating system: ColorOS 15 (based on Android 15)
- System-on-chip: Find X8 / X8 Pro: MediaTek Dimensity 9400 (3 nm); Find X8 Ultra: Qualcomm Snapdragon 8 Elite (3 nm)
- CPU: Octa-core
- GPU: Find X8/X8 Pro: Immortalis-G925; Find X8 Ultra: Adreno 830
- Memory: 12 or 16 GB RAM
- Storage: 256 GB, 512 GB, or 1 TB; Find X8/X8 Pro: UFS 4.0; Find X8 Ultra: UFS 4.1
- Removable storage: None
- SIM: Nano-SIM + eSIM or Dual Nano-SIM
- Battery: Find X8: 5630 mAh; Find X8 Pro: 5910 mAh; Find X8 Ultra: 6100 mAh
- Charging: Find X8/X8 Pro: 80W wired, 50W wireless, 10W reverse wireless Find X8 Ultra: 100W wired, 50W wireless, 10W reverse wireless
- Rear camera: Find X8: 50 MP, f/1.8, 24mm (wide), OIS; 50 MP, f/2.0, 15mm (ultrawide); 50 MP, f/2.6, 73mm, 3x optical zoom (periscope telephoto), OIS Find X8 Pro: 50 MP, f/1.6, 23mm (wide), OIS; 50 MP, f/2.0, 15mm (ultrawide); 50 MP, f/2.6, 73mm, 3x optical zoom (periscope telephoto), OIS; 50 MP, f/4.3, 135mm, 6x optical zoom (periscope telephoto), OIS Find X8 Ultra: 50 MP, f/1.8, 23mm, 1.0"-type (wide), OIS; 50 MP, f/2.0, 15mm (ultrawide); 50 MP, f/2.1, 70mm, 3x optical zoom (periscope telephoto), OIS; 50 MP, f/3.1, 135mm, 6x optical zoom (periscope telephoto), OIS
- Front camera: 32 MP, f/2.4, 21mm (wide), 4K@30/60 fps video recording
- Display: Find X8: 6.59 in (167 mm) LTPO AMOLED, 2760 × 1256, 120 Hz refresh rate, 4500 nits peak brightness Find X8 Pro: 6.78 in (172 mm) LTPO AMOLED, 2780 × 1264, 120 Hz refresh rate, 4500 nits peak brightness Find X8 Ultra: 6.82 in (173 mm) LTPO AMOLED, 3168 × 1440 1440p, 120 Hz refresh rate, 2500 nits peak brightness
- Sound: Dolby Atmos stereo speakers
- Connectivity: Wi-Fi 802.11 a/b/g/n/ac/6/7; Bluetooth 5.4; NFC; Infrared port
- Data inputs: Fingerprint scanner (optical on X8/X8 Pro, ultrasonic on Ultra); Accelerometer; gyroscope; proximity sensor; electronic compass; Colour spectrum sensor
- Model: CPH2651, PKB110 (Find X8); CPH2659, PKC110, PKC130 (Find X8 Pro); PKJ110, PKU110 (Find X8 Ultra)
- Codename: CPH2651 (Find X8); CPH2659 (Find X8 Pro); PKJ110, PKU110 (Find X8 Ultra)
- Website: www.oppo.com/en/smartphones/series-find-x/find-x8-pro/

The Oppo Find X8 is a series of Android-based smartphones manufactured by Oppo as part of its flagship Find X series. Unveiled as successors to the Oppo Find X7 series, the Find X8 and Find X8 Pro were launched on October 30, 2024, and released on November 21, 2024. The high-end Find X8 Ultra model was released on April 16, 2025.

== Lineup ==
The Find X8 series consists of three devices: the Find X8, the Find X8 Pro, and the top-of-the-line Find X8 Ultra. The Find X8 Pro is notable for being one of the first globally available smartphones to feature two periscope telephoto cameras. The Find X8 Ultra enhances the camera system with a 1.0"-type main sensor for improved light gathering and image quality.

== Design ==
All three models feature glass and aluminum construction with Gorilla Glass 7i protection on the front and back. The Find X8, X8 Pro and X8 Ultra all feature a flat display. All models are IP68 and IP69 rated for high-level dust and water resistance.

The Find X8 has a 6.59-inch display and weighs 193g. The Find X8 Pro has a larger 6.78-inch display and weighs 215g. The Find X8 Ultra is the largest, with a 6.82-inch display and a weight of 226g.

== Specifications ==
=== Hardware ===
The Find X8 and Find X8 Pro are powered by the MediaTek Dimensity 9400 chipset, built on a 3nm process. The Find X8 Ultra uses the Qualcomm Snapdragon 8 Elite chipset, which is also built on a 3nm process.

All models are available with 12 GB or 16 GB of RAM and storage options ranging from 256 GB to 1 TB. The Find X8 and X8 Pro use UFS 4.0 storage, while the Find X8 Ultra is equipped with even faster UFS 4.1 storage.

Battery capacity increases with each model: the Find X8 has a 5630 mAh battery, the Find X8 Pro a 5910 mAh battery, and the Find X8 Ultra a 6100 mAh silicon-carbon battery. The X8 and X8 Pro support 80 W wired and 50 W wireless charging, while the Ultra supports faster 100 W wired and 50 W wireless charging. All three models support 10 W reverse wireless charging.

=== Camera ===
The Find X8 series features camera systems with Hasselblad Color Calibration. The Find X8 has a triple camera setup with a 50 MP wide sensor, a 50 MP ultrawide sensor, and a 50 MP periscope telephoto lens with 3x optical zoom. The Find X8 Pro features a quad-camera system. It includes a 50 MP wide sensor, a 50 MP ultrawide sensor, and two periscope telephoto lenses: a 50 MP sensor with 3x optical zoom and another 50 MP sensor with 6x optical zoom. The Find X8 Ultra also features a quad-camera system, headlined by a large 1.0"-type 50 MP main sensor. It is complemented by a 50 MP ultrawide lens and two periscope telephoto cameras at 3x and 6x optical zoom.

All rear cameras and the 32 MP front-facing camera support 4K video recording at 30 and 60fps. The Find X8 Ultra's main camera can also record 4K at 120fps.

=== Software ===
The Find X8 series runs on ColorOS 15, which is based on Android 15. The software includes features such as Circle to Search. China version models also offer satellite connectivity for emergency communication (SOS). The device supports multiple satellite navigation systems, including A-GPS, GPS L1, BDS B1I, GLONASS G1, GALILEO E1, and QZSS L1.

ColorOS 16 was released on October 16th 2025.

== Reception ==
TechRadar were enthusiastic regarding the phone, but noted that several ColorOS features were highly reminiscent of similar Apple features, such as the "Live Alerts capsule [which] looks to be a direct lift of the iPhone's Dynamic Island." Techradar and other reviewers praised the high price–performance ratio compared to top of the line smartphones such iPhone 16 Pro and Galaxy S24 Ultra. Many are still waiting for the Ultra model to be released globally.

== See also ==
- List of large sensor camera phones

Preceded by Oppo Find X7 / X7 Ultra	Oppo; 7th generation	Succeeded by Oppo Find X9
