= OnePlus 13 =

Android smartphone

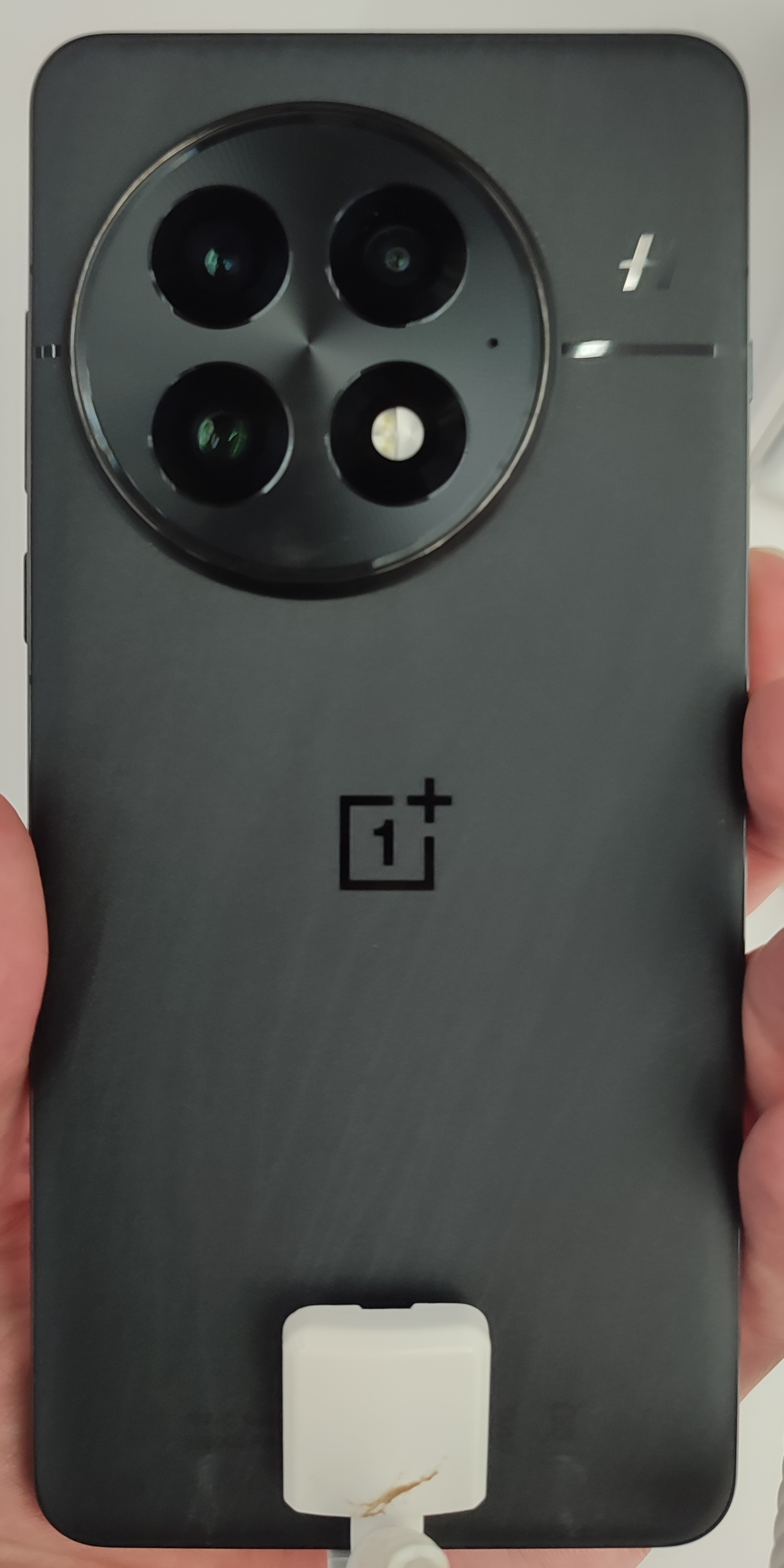
- The back of the OnePlus 13 in Black Eclipse
- Developer: OnePlus
- Manufacturer: Oppo
- First released: November 1, 2024; 23 months ago (China), January 7, 2025; 21 months ago (international)
- Predecessor: OnePlus 12
- Successor: OnePlus 15
- Related: OnePlus 13R
- Compatible networks: 2G, 3G, 4G, 4G LTE, 5G NR (dual sim)
- Form factor: Slate
- Colors: Black, Blue, White
- Dimensions: H: 162.9 mm (6.41 in) W: 76.5 mm (3.01 in) D: 8.5 mm (0.33 in) D: 8.9 mm (0.35 in)
- Weight: 210 g (7.4 oz) 213 g (7.5 oz)
- Operating system: Android 15, OxygenOS 15 (international), ColorOS 15 (China)
- System-on-chip: Qualcomm SM8750-AB Snapdragon 8 Elite (3 nm)
- CPU: Octa-core (2x4.32 GHz Oryon V2 Phoenix L + 6x3.53 GHz Oryon V2 Phoenix M)
- GPU: Adreno 830
- Modem: Qualcomm X80 5G
- Memory: 256GB: 12GB RAM; 512GB: 12GB RAM; 512GB: 16GB RAM; 1TB: 24GB RAM
- Storage: UFS 4.0:
- Battery: silicon carbon 6000 mAh
- Charging: International: 100W wired, PD, 100% in 36 min; International: 50W magnetic charger (with magnetic case), 100% in 75 min; International: OnePlus AirVOOC 50W wireless charger, 100% in 75 min
- Rear camera: Triple cameras: 50 MP, f/1.6, 23mm (wide), 1/1.43", 1.12μm, multi-directional PDAF, OIS; 50 MP, f/2.6, 73mm (periscope telephoto), 1/1.95", 3x optical zoom, PDAF, OIS; 50 MP, f/2.0, 15mm, 120˚ (ultrawide), PDAF
- Front camera: 32 MP, f/2.4, 21mm (wide), 1/2.74", 0.8μm
- Display: Type: LTPO AMOLED, 1B colors, 120Hz, Dolby Vision, HDR10+, 800 nits (typ), 1600 nits (HBM), 4500 nits (peak); Size: 6.82 in (173 mm) ~90.7% screen-to-body ratio; Resolution: 1440 x 3168 pixels; Protection: Crystal Shield super-ceramic glass
- Connectivity: Bluetooth 5.4, A2DP, LE, aptX HD, LHDC 5 NFC GPS (L1+L5), GLONASS (G1), BDS (B1I+B1c+B2a), GALILEO (E1+E5a), QZSS (L1+L5), NavIC Wi-Fi 802.11 a/b/g/n/ac/6/7, dual or tri-band, Wi-Fi Direct
- Water resistance: IP68/IP69 dust/water resistant (up to 1.5m for 30 min)
- Model: PJZ110, CPH2653, CPH2649, CPH2655
- Codename: dodge
- Website: www.oneplus.com/us/oneplus-13

The OnePlus 13 is an Android-based smartphone manufactured by OnePlus. Announced on October 31, 2024, it was released in China a day later, and internationally on January 7, 2025.

The OnePlus 13s, part of the 13 series, was announced in India in June 2025.

OnePlus 13 is available in 3 colours—a white and black variant which has a glass back, and a blue variant which uses vegan leather. It has flat sides as opposed to the curved sides of its predecessor OnePlus 12.

== Specifications ==
=== Hardware ===
==== Battery ====
OnePlus 13 uses a 6,000 mAh silicon carbon battery, which has a higher energy density compared to the typical graphite-based lithium-ion batteries found in most smartphones. Being OnePlus' first smartphone to employ this new technology, it allowed the OnePlus 13 to have a higher battery capacity while being thinner than the OnePlus 12, and has the highest battery capacity of all their smartphones to date.

Notebookcheck reported that the OnePlus 13 has a higher battery runtime than OnePlus 12 in all 3 tests—2267 minutes vs 1965 minutes in Reader/Idle test, 2321 minutes vs 1820 minutes in H.264 video playback test, and 1349 minutes vs 1237 minutes in Wi-Fi websurfing test.

OnePlus 13 supports 50W wireless charging using the OnePlus AirVOOC charger and the AirVOOC magnetic charger with a magnetic case. A full charge in both cases is estimated to take 75 minutes.

==== Camera system ====
Specs from the official website page
	Main	Telephoto	Ultra-wide	Front
Sensor	Sony LYT-808	Sony LYT-600 with 3X optical zoom	S5KJN5	Sony IMX615
Sensor Size	1/1.4"	1/1.95"	1/2.75"	1/2.74"
Megapixels	50	50	50	32
Pixel Size	1.12 μm	0.8 μm	0.64 μm	0.8 μm
Lens Quantity	7P	1G3P	6P	5P
ALC lens coating	Yes		No	
Optical Image Stabilization	Yes		No	
Electronic Image Stabilization	Yes		Yes	
Focal Length	23 mm equivalent	73 mm equivalent	15 mm equivalent	21 mm equivalent
Aperture	ƒ/1.6	ƒ/2.6	ƒ/2.0	ƒ/2.4
Field of View	85°	32.8°	120°	90°
Autofocus	Yes	Yes	Yes	Fixed Focus

=== Software ===
OnePlus 13 ships with Android 15. OnePlus promised four years of feature Android updates and six years of security patches for this model.

OxygenOS 16 (based on Android 16) was released for the in November 2025.

== Reception ==
OnePlus 13 was described as having high-end capabilities with a great battery while at an affordable price by Notebookcheck. Richard Priday from Tomsguide praised the model for excelling in battery life, charging speed and screen quality.

Preceded by OnePlus 12	OnePlus 13; 2024	Succeeded by OnePlus 15
