= OnePlus 11 =

Android smartphone

- Brand: OnePlus
- Type: Smartphone
- First released: January 9, 2023; 3 years ago
- Predecessor: OnePlus 10 Pro
- Successor: OnePlus 12
- Compatible networks: 2G, 3G, 4G, 4G LTE, 5G NR
- Form factor: Slate
- Colors: Titan Black; Eternal Green; Jupiter Rock
- Dimensions: H: 163.1 mm (6.42 in) W: 74.1 mm (2.92 in) D: 8.5 mm (0.33 in)
- Weight: 205 g (7.2 oz)
- Operating system: Original: Android 13 with OxygenOS 13/ColorOS 13; Currently: Android 16 with OxygenOS 16/ColorOS 16; Unofficial: Android 17 with LineageOS 24.0
- System-on-chip: Qualcomm Snapdragon 8 Gen 2
- CPU: Octa cores: 1x Cortex-X3 (3.2 GHz); 2x Cortex-A715 (2.8 GHz); 2x Cortex-A710 (2.8 GHz); 3x Cortex-A510 (2.0 GHz)
- GPU: Adreno 740
- Modem: Qualcomm X70 5G
- Memory: 128GB: 8GB RAM; 256GB: 12GB RAM; 256GB & 512GB: 16GB RAM
- Storage: UFS 3.1: 128GB only; UFS 4.0: 256GB, 512GB
- Battery: Li-Po 5000 mAh non-removable
- Charging: International: 100W wired, PD, 50% in 10 min, 100% in 25 min (advertised); USA: 80W wired, PD
- Rear camera: Triple-Camera Setup; Primary: Sony IMX 890; 50 MP, f/1.8, 24mm, FoV 84°, 1/1.56", 1.0μm, multi-directional PDAF, OIS; Telephoto: Sony IMX 709; 32 MP, f/2.0, 48mm, 1/2.74", PDAF, 2x optical zoom; Ultrawide: Sony IMX 581; 48 MP, f/2.2, FoV 115°, 1/2.0", AF; Features: Hasselblad Color Calibration, color spectrum sensor, Dual-LED flash, HDR, panorama; Video: 8K@24fps, 4K@30/60fps, 1080p@30/60/240fps, Auto HDR, gyro-EIS
- Front camera: Samsung ISOCELL S5K3P9; 16 MP, f/2.5, 25mm (wide), 1/3.0", 1.0μm; Features: HDR, panorama; Video: 1080p@30fps, gyro-EIS
- Display: Size: 6.7 in (170 mm) ~89.7% screen-to-body ratio; Resolution: 1440 x 3216 pixels; Protection: Corning Gorilla Glass Victus
- Connectivity: Bluetooth 5.3 NFC GPS (L1+L5 Dual Band), GLONASS, Galileo (E1+E5a Dual Band), Beidou, A-GPS, QZSS WiFi 802.11 a/b/g/n/ac/ax/be
- Water resistance: IP64
- Model: PHB110: China; CPH2447: India; CPH2449: International; CPH2451: North America
- Hearing aid compatibility: M3, T3
- Website: www.oneplus.com/us/11

The OnePlus 11 is an Android-based smartphone manufactured by OnePlus and co-developed with Hasselblad. It was released on January 9th, 2023 and succeeds the OnePlus 10 Pro. It ships with a screen protector pre-applied.

It diverted from usual portfolio offering, in which there is only one flagship offered. This was an effort by OnePlus to streamline its flagship line and marked the end of 'Pro' naming scheme onwards. There is a lesser variant called OnePlus 11R which is only available in India.

== Design ==
The OnePlus 11 brings a sleek and modern design that reflects the brand's focus on aesthetics and build quality. It is composed of glass and metal combination. Both front and back are covered in Gorilla Glass Victus and 5 respectively. It is supported by aluminium frame.

At launch, two colors were available, with color addition later on:

- Titan Black - has a matte-frosted glass with silky finish. Fingerprint-resistant design.
- Eternal Green - has a glossy finish, inspired by the shade of rainforest dusk. Features an internal layering treatment that reduces fingerprint smudges.
- OnePlus also brings another new edition, called OnePlus 11 Jupiter Rock Limited Edition, also powered by Qualcomm Snapdragon 8 Gen 2. It is only available in China.

Its distinguishing appearance is on the design of its back camera. It features a circular camera housing on the back, which contains a triple-camera setup and the flash. Hasselblad branding is visible in the middle. The circular design is distinctive enough to make it one of the standout design elements of the OnePlus 11.

It has a curved front screen and back design. The placement of front camera is positioned in the upper left corner of the front screen. Volume rocker is situated on the left side of the body and there is a unique feature called the "alert slider", which makes a return after being removed by OnePlus for previous series on the right. The power button is positioned at the lower right side of the body.

The SIM card tray, microphone, USB-C connector and speaker are on the bottom. The top hosts another speaker and microphone.

== Hardware ==
=== Chipset ===
OnePlus 11 uses the Snapdragon 8 Gen 2 processor with the Adreno 740 GPU.

=== Display ===
It has a curved, 120Hz refresh rate, 2K Super Fluid AMOLED display, manufactured by Samsung Display. The 6.7-inch screen is of third generation LTPO AMOLED and has QHD+ resolution. Dolby Vision, Dolby Atmos HDR, and 10-bit color depth are supported with the display. It supports variable refresh rate.

=== Camera system ===
	Sensor	Megapixels	Sensor size	Lens quantity	Aperture	Field of view	Autofocus	Notes
Main camera	Sony IMX890	50	1/1.56"	6P	ƒ/1.8	84°	Yes	Optical image stabilization: Yes; Electronic image stabilization: Yes; Focal length: 24mm equivalent
Ultra-wide camera	Sony IMX581	48	1/2"	6P	ƒ/2.2	115°	Yes	
Portrait tele camera	Sony IMX709	32	1/2.74"	6P	ƒ/2.0	49°	Yes	Optical zoom: 2X
								Others: 13-channel Accu-spectrum Light-color Identifier; Dual LED Flash

	Sensor	Megapixels	Aperture	Autofocus	Notes
Front camera	Sony IMX890	16	ƒ/2.45	Fixed focus	Electronic image stabilization: Yes

=== Connectivity ===
OnePlus 11 supports eSIM, aside from conventional dual nano sim card slot.

It has Bluetooth version 5.3. Codec supported: aptX HD, aptX, LDAC, LHDC, AAC, SBC.

=== Battery & charging ===
OnePlus 11 comes with non-removable dual cell battery, 2,500mAh each, totalling to 5,000mAh. To achieve the fastest charging speed, it uses proprietary OnePlus's technology, Super VOOC 100W. Those in United States are supplied with 80W variant due to the country limitation on voltage socket.

Average charging speed to full capacity is around 25 minutes using global proprietary charger.

== Software & support ==
OnePlus 11 ships with OxygenOS 13.0 on top of Android 13 for all countries besides China. The Chinese variant uses ColorOS. OnePlus claims to support at least four generations of Android upgrades and five years of security updates from the launch date.

OxygenOS 16 (based on Android 16) was released for the device. in December 2025.

== Reception ==
Allison Johnson at The Verge praised its screen, long software support, and price tag while criticized its lack of wireless charging and inconsistent telephoto camera performance.

Preceded by OnePlus 10 Pro	OnePlus 11; 2023	Succeeded by OnePlus 12
