= OnePlus 10T =

Android-based smartphone manufactured by OnePlus

- Brand: OnePlus
- Manufacturer: OnePlus
- Type: Phablet
- Series: OnePlus
- Predecessor: OnePlus 8T
- Related: OnePlus 10 Pro; OnePlus 10R
- Compatible networks: 2G / 3G / 4G LTE / 5G NR
- Form factor: Slate
- Colors: Moonstone Black, Jade Green
- Dimensions: 163 mm (6.4 in) H 75.4 mm (2.97 in) W 8.8 mm (0.35 in) D
- Weight: 204 g (7.2 oz)
- Operating system: Android 12 with OxygenOS 12
- System-on-chip: Qualcomm Snapdragon 8+ Gen 1 (4 nm)
- CPU: Octa-core (1x3.19 GHz Cortex-X2 & 3x2.75 GHz Cortex-A710 & 4x1.80 GHz Cortex-A510)
- GPU: Adreno 730
- Memory: 8, 12 and 16 GB RAM
- Storage: 128 and 256 GB UFS 3.1
- Removable storage: Unsupported
- SIM: Dual SIM (Nano-SIM, dual stand-by)
- Battery: Li-Po 4800 mAh
- Charging: Fast charging 150W
- Rear camera: 50 MP, f/1.8, 24mm (wide), 1/1.56", 1.0 μm, PDAF, OIS; 8 MP, f/2.2, 120˚ (ultrawide), 1/4", 1.12 μm; 2 MP, f/2.4, (macro); Dual LED flash, HDR, panorama; 4K@30/60fps, 1080p@30/60/240fps, gyro-EIS
- Front camera: 16 MP, f/2.4, 24mm (wide), 1/3", 1.0 μm 1080p@30fps
- Display: 6.7 in (170 mm); 1080 x 2412 px resolution, 20:9 ratio (~394 ppi density); Fluid AMOLED, 1B colors, 120Hz refresh rate, HDR10+ Corning Gorilla Glass 5
- Sound: Stereo speakers
- Connectivity: Wi-Fi 802.11 a/b/g/n/ac/6, dual-band, Wi-Fi Direct; Bluetooth 5.2, A2DP, LE, aptX HD
- Data inputs: Multi-touch screen; USB Type-C 2.0; Fingerprint scanner (under display, optical); Accelerometer; Gyroscope; Proximity sensor; Compass; Color spectrum
- Website: www.oneplus.com/10t

The OnePlus 10T is a high-end Android-based smartphone manufactured by OnePlus, unveiled on August 3, 2022. Designed as a successor to the OnePlus 8T, the 10T features a Qualcomm Snapdragon 8+ Gen 1 chipset, an octa-core CPU, and an Adreno 730 GPU. Available in Moonstone Black and Jade Green, the phone has a sleek slate form factor with dimensions of 163 mm in height, 75.4 mm in width, and 8.8 mm in thickness, and weighs 204 grams.

The OnePlus 10T has a 6.7-inch Fluid AMOLED display with a resolution of 1080 x 2412 pixels, a 20:9 aspect ratio, and a 120Hz refresh rate.

The camera setup includes a triple rear camera system with a 50 MP main sensor, an 8 MP ultrawide lens, and a 2 MP macro lens, capable of recording 4K video at 30/60fps and 1080p video at up to 240fps. The front-facing camera features a 16 MP sensor.

Additional features include a 4800 mAh battery with 150W fast charging, stereo speakers, and a range of connectivity options such as Wi-Fi 6, Bluetooth 5.2, and USB Type-C. The OnePlus 10T also includes an under-display optical fingerprint scanner, accelerometer, gyroscope, proximity sensor, compass, and a color spectrum sensor.

The OnePlus 10T is related to the OnePlus 10 Pro and OnePlus 10R, sharing similar design and performance traits.

Preceded by OnePlus 8T	OnePlus 10T; 2022	Succeeded by recent
