= Oppo Find X9 =

Series of Android smartphones

Oppo Find X9 Oppo Find X9 Pro Oppo Find X9 Ultra Oppo Find X9s Oppo Find X9s Pro
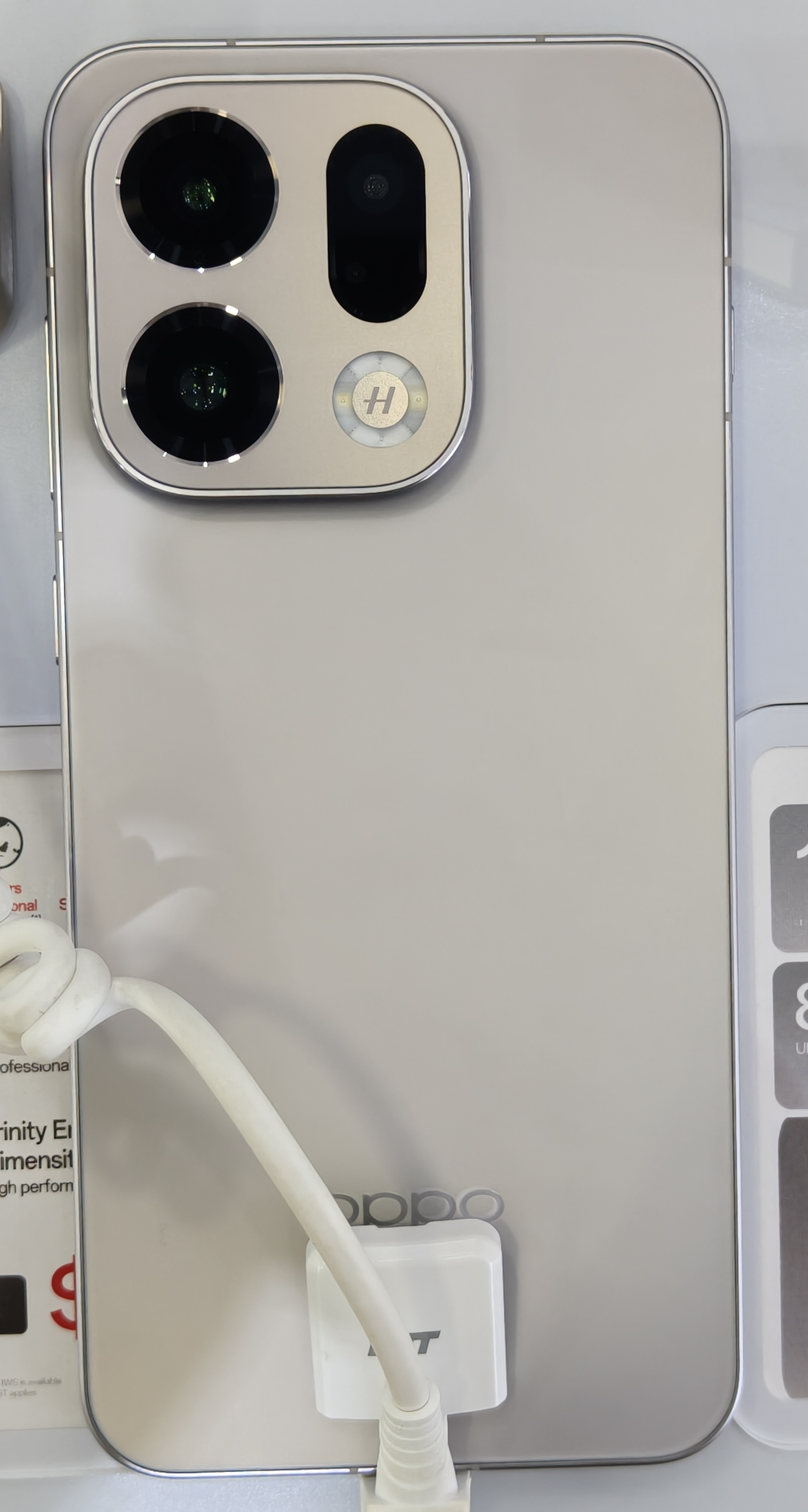
- Oppo Find X9
- Brand: Oppo
- Manufacturer: OPPO Electronics
- Type: Smartphone
- Series: Oppo Find X Series
- First released: Find X9/X9 Pro: October 16, 2025; 12 months ago Find X9 Ultra/X9s/X9s Pro: April 21, 2026; 6 months ago
- Availability by region: Find X9/X9 Pro: October 22, 2025; 12 months ago Find X9s/X9s Pro: April 2026; 7 months ago Find X9 Ultra: May 2, 2026; 6 months ago
- Predecessor: Oppo Find X8
- Successor: Oppo Find X10
- Compatible networks: List: Technology: GSM / HSPA / LTE / 5G; 2G bands: All: GSM 850 / 900 / 1800 / 1900; 3G bands: Find X9/X9 Pro/X9 Ultra/X9s: HSDPA 800 / 850 / 900 / 1700(AWS) / 1900 / 2100 - International, China; HSDPA 900 / 2100 - India; Find X9s Pro: HSDPA 850 / 900 / 1700(AWS) / 1800 / 1900 / 2100; 4G bands (LTE): Find X9: 1, 2, 3, 4, 5, 7, 8, 12, 13, 17, 18, 19, 20, 26, 28, 32, 38, 39, 40, 41, 42, 48, 66 - International; 1, 2, 3, 4, 5, 7, 8, 18, 19, 25, 26, 28, 34, 38, 39, 40, 41, 42, 43, 48, 66 - China; 1, 3, 5, 8, 40 - India; Find X9 Pro: 1, 2, 3, 4, 5, 7, 8, 12, 13, 17, 18, 19, 20, 25, 26, 28, 32, 38, 39, 40, 41, 42, 48, 66, 71 - International; 1, 2, 3, 4, 5, 7, 8, 12, 17, 18, 19, 20, 25, 26, 28, 34, 38, 39, 40, 41, 42, 43, 48, 66 - China; 1, 3, 5, 8, 40 - India; Find X9 Ultra: 1, 2, 3, 4, 5, 7, 8, 12, 13, 17, 18, 19, 20, 25, 26, 28, 32, 34, 38, 39, 40, 41, 42, 43, 48, 66, 71 - Global; 1, 3, 5, 8, 40 - India; Find X9s: 1, 2, 3, 4, 5, 7, 8, 12, 17, 18, 19, 20, 26, 28, 32, 38, 39, 40, 41, 42, 48, 66 - Global; 1, 3, 5, 8, 40 - India; Find X9s Pro: 1, 2, 3, 4, 5, 7, 8, 18, 19, 25, 26, 28, 34, 38, 39, 40, 41, 42, 43, 48, 66; 5G bands: Find X9: 1, 2, 3, 5, 7, 8, 12, 20, 26, 28, 38, 40, 41, 48, 66, 75, 77, 78 SA/NSA - International; 1, 2, 3, 5, 7, 8, 18, 25, 26, 28, 34, 38, 39, 40, 41, 48, 66, 77, 78 SA/NSA - China; 1, 3, 5, 8, 40 SA/NSA - India; Find X9 Pro: 1, 2, 3, 5, 7, 8, 12, 20, 25, 26, 28, 38, 40, 41, 48, 66, 71, 75, 76, 77, 78, 79 SA/NSA - International; 1, 2, 3, 5, 7, 8, 12, 18, 20, 25, 26, 28, 34, 38, 39, 40, 41, 48, 66, 77, 78, 79 SA/NSA - China; 1, 3, 5, 8, 40 SA/NSA - India; Find X9 Ultra: 1, 2, 3, 5, 7, 8, 12, 18, 20, 25, 26, 28, 38, 40, 41, 48, 66, 71, 75, 77, 78, 79, 80, 81, 83, 84, 89 SA/NSA - Global; 1, 3, 5, 8, 40 SA/NSA - India; Find X9s: 1, 2, 3, 5, 7, 8, 12, 20, 26, 28, 38, 40, 41, 48, 66, 75, 77, 78 SA/NSA - Global; 1, 3, 5, 8, 40 SA/NSA; Find X9s Pro: 1, 2, 3, 5, 7, 8, 18, 25, 26, 28, 34, 38, 39, 40, 41, 48, 66, 77, 78, 79 SA/NSA; Speed: HSPA, LTE, 5G
- Form factor: Slate
- Dimensions: Find X9: 157.0 mm (6.18 in) H 73.9 mm (2.91 in) W 8.0 mm (0.31 in) D Find X9 Pro: 161.3 mm (6.35 in) H 76.5 mm (3.01 in) W 8.3 mm (0.33 in) D Find X9 Ultra: 163.2 mm (6.43 in) H 77.0 mm (3.03 in) W 8.7 mm (0.34 in) or 9.1 mm (0.36 in) D Find X9s: 157.0 mm (6.18 in) H 73.9 mm (2.91 in) W 8.0 mm (0.31 in) D Find X9s Pro: 150.5 mm (5.93 in) H 71.7 mm (2.82 in) W 8.4 mm (0.33 in) or 8.6 mm (0.34 in) D
- Weight: Find X9: 203 g (7.2 oz); Find X9 Pro: 224 g (7.9 oz); Find X9 Ultra: 235 g (8.3 oz); Find X9s: 202 g (7.1 oz); Find X9s Pro: 198 g (7.0 oz) or 200 g (7.1 oz)
- Operating system: Original: Android 16 with ColorOS 16; Current: Android 16 with ColorOS 16.0.10 (16.1)
- System-on-chip: Find X9/X9 Pro/X9s Pro: MediaTek Dimensity 9500 (3 nm); Find X9 Ultra: Qualcomm SM8850-AC Snapdragon 8 Elite Gen 5 (3 nm); Find X9s: MediaTek Dimensity 9500s (3 nm)
- CPU: Find X9/X9 Pro/X9s Pro: Octa-core (1x4.21 GHz C1-Ultra & 3x3.5 GHz C1-Premium & 4x2.7 GHz C1-Pro); Find X9 Ultra: Octa-core (2x4.6 GHz Oryon V3 Phoenix L + 6x3.62 GHz Oryon V3 Phoenix M); Find X9s: Octa-core (1x3.73 GHz Cortex-X925 & 3x3.3 GHz Cortex-X4 & 4x2.4 GHz Cortex-A720)
- GPU: Find X9/X9 Pro: Arm G1-Ultra; Find X9 Ultra: Adreno 840; Find X9s/X9s Pro: Immortalis-G925
- Memory: Find X9/X9 Pro/X9 Ultra/X9s Pro: 12 / 16 GB; Find X9s: 12 GB
- Storage: Find X9/X9 Pro/X9 Ultra/X9s Pro: 256 GB / 512 GB / 1 TB; Find X9s: 256 GB / 512 GB
- Removable storage: None
- SIM: Find X9/X9 Pro: nano-SIM + eSIM; Dual nano-SIM; Find X9 Ultra/X9s: Dual nano-SIM + eSIM (max 2 at a time); Find X9s Pro: Dual nano-SIM
- Battery: Find X9/X9s/X9s Pro: Si/C Li-Ion 7025 mAh; Find X9 Pro: Si/C Li-Ion 7500 mAh; Find X9 Ultra: Si/C Li-Ion 7050 mAh
- Charging: Wired: Find X9/X9 Pro: 80W SuperVOOC, 80W UFCS, 55W PPS, 11.7W PD; Find X9 Ultra: 100W SuperVOOC, 55W PPS, 18W PD/QC; Find X9s: 80W SuperVOOC, 55W PPS, 13.5W PD; Find X9s Pro: 80W SuperVOOC, 44W/80W UFCS, 55W PPS, 13.5W PD; Wireless: Find X9/X9 Pro/X9 Ultra/X9s Pro: 50W AirVOOC; Find X9s: None; Reverse Wireless: Find X9/X9 Pro/X9 Ultra: 10W; Find X9s: None
- Rear camera: Triple-Camera Setup; Find X9: Primary: Sony LYT-808; 50 MP, f/1.6, 23mm, 1/1.43", 1.12µm, multi-directional PDAF, OIS; Periscope Telephoto: Sony LYT-600; 50 MP, f/2.6, 73mm, 1/1.95", 0.8µm, 3x optical zoom, multi-directional PDAF, OIS; Ultrawide: Samsung ISOCELL (S5K)JN5; 50 MP, f/2.0, 15mm, 120°, 1/2.76", 0.64µm, multi-directional PDAF; Find X9 Pro: Primary: Sony LYT-828; 50 MP, f/1.5, 23mm, 1/1.28", 1.22µm, multi-directional PDAF, OIS; Periscope Telephoto: Samsung ISOCELL (S5K)HP5; 200 MP, f/2.1, 70mm, 1/1.56", 0.5µm, 3x optical zoom, multi-directional PDAF, OIS; Ultrawide: Samsung ISOCELL (S5K)JN5; 50 MP, f/2.0, 15mm, 120°, 1/2.76", 0.64µm, multi-directional PDAF; Find X9s: Primary: Sony LYT-700; 50 MP, f/1.8, 24mm, FoV 84°, 1/1.56", 1.0µm, PDAF, OIS; Telephoto: Sony LYT-600; 50 MP, f/2.6, 73mm, 1/1.95", 0.8µm, PDAF, OIS, 3x optical zoom; Ultrawide: Samsung ISOCELL (S5K)JN5; 50 MP, f/2.0, 15mm, FoV 120°, 1/2.76", 0.64µm, PDAF; Find X9s Pro: Primary: Samsung ISOCELL (S5K)HP9; 200 MP, f/1.6, 23mm, 1/1.4", 0.56µm, PDAF, OIS; Periscope Telephoto: Samsung ISOCELL (S5K)HP5; 200 MP, f/2.6, 65mm, 1/1.56", 0.5µm, PDAF, OIS, 2.8x optical zoom; Ultrawide: Samsung ISOCELL (S5K)JN5; 50 MP, f/2.0, 15mm, FoV 120°, 1/2.76", 0.64µm, PDAF; Quad-Camera Setup; Find X9 Ultra: Primary: Sony LYT-901; 200 MP, f/1.5, 23mm, 1/1.12", 0.7µm, PDAF, OIS; Periscope Telephoto 1: OmniVision OV52A; 200 MP, f/2.2, 70mm, 1/1.28", 0.61µm, PDAF, (15cm - ∞), OIS, 3x optical zoom; Periscope Telephoto 2: Samsung ISOCELL (S5K)JNL; 50 MP, f/3.5, 230mm, 1/2.75", 0.64µm, multi-directional PDAF, OIS, 10x optical zoom; Ultrawide: Sony LYT-600; 50 MP, f/2.0, 14mm, FoV 123°, 1/1.95", 0.8µm, multi-directional PDAF; Camera features: Find X9 / X9 Pro / X9s / X9 Ultra: Laser AF, color spectrum sensor, Hasselblad Color Calibration, LED flash, HDR, Panorama (Find X9 & Find X9 Pro & X9s & X9 Ultra), LUT preview (Find X9 Pro only); Find X9s Pro: Laser AF, color spectrum sensor, Hasselblad Color Calibration, Hasselblad Ultra HD, HDR, Panorama, Multi-focus LED flash; Video recording: Find X9 / X9 Pro: 4K@30/60/120fps, 1080p@30/60/240fps; gyro-EIS; HDR, 10‑bit video, Dolby Vision, LOG; Find X9 Ultra: 8K@30fps, 4K@30/60/120fps, 1080p@30/60/120/240fps; gyro-EIS; Dolby Vision HDR, 10‑bit video, O-Log2, cinematic LUT; Find X9s: 4K@30/60/120fps, 1080p@30/60/240fps, gyro-EIS, OIS, Dolby Vision HDR; Find X9s Pro: 8K@30fps (10-bit Log), 4K@30/60/120fps, 1080p@30/60/120/240fps, gyro-EIS, OIS, Dolby Vision HDR, 3D LUT
- Front camera: Find X9 / X9s / X9s Pro: Sony IMX 615; 32 MP, f/2.4, 21mm (wide), 1/2.74", 0.8µm, FF; Find X9 Pro: Samsung ISOCELL (S5K)JN5; 50 MP, f/2.0, 21mm (wide), 1/2.76", 0.64µm, PDAF; Find X9 Ultra: Samsung ISOCELL (S5K)JN5; 50 MP, f/2.4, 21mm (wide), 1/2.75", 0.64µm, PDAF; Camera features: Find X9 / X9 Pro / X9s: Panorama; Find X9 Ultra / X9s Pro: Panorama, HDR; Video recording: Find X9 / X9 Pro / X9s / X9s Pro: 4K@30/60fps, 1080p@30/60fps, gyro-EIS; Find X9 Ultra: 4K@30/60fps, 1080p@30/60fps, gyro-EIS, HDR
- Display: Find X9: 6.59 in (167 mm); 1256 x 2760 px resolution, (~460 ppi density); AMOLED, 1B colors, 120Hz, 3840Hz PWM, Dolby Vision, HDR10+, HDR Vivid, 800 nits (typ), 1800 nits (HBM), 3600 nits (peak); Corning Gorilla Glass 7i, Mohs level 5 Ultra HDR image support Find X9 Pro: 6.78 in (172 mm); 1272 x 2772 px resolution, 19.5:9 ratio, (~450 ppi density); LTPO AMOLED, 1B colors, 120Hz, 2160Hz PWM, Dolby Vision, HDR10+, HDR Vivid, 800 nits (typ), 1800 nits (HBM), 3600 nits (peak); Corning Gorilla Glass Victus 2, Mohs level 5 Ultra HDR image support
- Sound: Stereo speakers
- Water resistance: IP66 / IP68 / IP69
- Model: Find X9: CPH2797, PLJ110; Find X9 Pro: CPH2791, PLG110; Find X9 Ultra: CPH2841, PMA110; Find X9s: CPH2873; Find X9s Pro: PME110
- Website: Find X9: www.oppo.com/en/smartphones/series-find-x/find-x9/ Find X9 Pro: www.oppo.com/en/smartphones/series-find-x/find-x9-pro/ Find X9 Ultra: www.oppo.com/en/smartphones/series-find-x/find-x9-ultra/ Find X9s: www.oppo.com/en/smartphones/series-find-x/find-x9s/

The Oppo Find X9 series are a line of Android-based smartphones developed and manufactured by Oppo. The series succeeds the Oppo Find X8 series and comprises two models OPPO Find X9 Pro and the standard OPPO Find X9.

== Lineup ==
The Find X9 series consists of two models: the Oppo Find X9 and Oppo Find X9 Pro.

The Find X9 Ultra was launched globally on April 21 2026, marking the first time that a Find Ultra series phone is sold globally.

The Find X9 Ultra was launched on May 28 2026 in India alongside the Find X9s. The Find X9 Ultra is offered in a lone 12GB/512GB configuration, while the Find X9s is offered in 12GB/256GB and 12GB/512GB memory options.

== Design ==
The Find X9 and Find X9 Pro has a similar industrial design feature an aluminum frame and glass construction. Both devices include an under-display fingerprint sensor for biometric authentication and are rated for dust and water resistance under multiple IP standards.

The Find X9 Pro is protected by Corning Gorilla Glass Victus 2, while the standard Find X9 uses Gorilla Glass 7i. Color options for the Find X9 Pro are Silk White and Titanium Charcoal. The standard Find X9 is available in Space Black, Velvet Red, and Titanium Grey.

The Find X9 Ultra utilizes the Snapdragon 8 Elite Gen 5 chipset and features a 10x optical periscope telephoto. It has a 6.82-inch LTPO AMOLED display, with 3600 nits peak HDR and 2160Hz PWM dimming, supports 100W wired SUPERVOOC charging and 50W AIRVOOC wireless charging. It is available in both Tundra Umber and Canyon Orange colorways.

The Find X9s is marketed as a travel-orientated device. It features an aluminium alloy frame and display bezels measuring 1.15mm. Its hardware features include a customisable physical button, referred to as the "Snap Key", and a 3D ultrasonic fingerprint sensor designed to remain functional when the user's hands are wet.

== Specifications ==
=== Hardware ===
The Oppo Find X9 is powered by the MediaTek Dimensity 9500 system-on-chip, manufactured using a 3-nanometre(nm) process. The octa-core processor integrates an Arm Mali-series GPU and supports on-device artificial intelligence processing and high-performance graphics tasks.

The device is offered in configurations with 12 GB or 16 GB of LPDDR5X RAM and internal storage options of 256 GB or 512 GB using UFS 4.1 flash storage.

For thermal management, the Find X9 incorporates a vapor-chamber cooling system intended to dissipate heat during sustained workloads such as gaming and video recording. The phone also includes an X-axis linear vibration motor for haptic feedback.

=== Camera ===
Both devices feature a multi-camera system developed in collaboration with Hasselblad. The primary difference between the models is the telephoto camera. The Find X9 Pro includes a 200-megapixel telephoto sensor with optical image stabilization, while the Find X9 uses a 50-megapixel periscope telephoto camera with optical stabilization.

Both models are equipped with a 50-megapixel main camera and a 50-megapixel ultra-wide camera. The front-facing camera differs by model, with the Find X9 Pro featuring a higher-resolution sensor with autofocus and the Find X9 using a fixed-focus sensor. Both devices support high-resolution video recording, including 4K capture at up to 120 frames per second.

The Find X9 Ultra features a quad-camera system co-developed with Hasselblad. The setup utilises two 200-megapixel sensors for its main and 3x telephoto cameras. It also includes a 50-megapixel ultrawide camera and a 50-megapixel periscope telephoto camera that incorporates a quintuple prism structure for 10x optical zoom. The device is capable of recording 8K video at 30 fps and 4K Dolby Vision video at 120 fps.

The Find X9s features triple 50MP rear camera array includes a 3x periscope telephoto lens supporting 120x digital zoom and an All-Focal-Length Hasselblad Portrait mode that combines three different frames into a single composite image.

=== Software ===
The Oppo Find X9 runs on ColorOS 16, based on Android. The operating system introduces the "Luminous Rendering Engine" to improve system smoothness and performance. It includes AI-based features such as "AI Mind Space," "AI Recording," and "AI Writer," along with Google Gemini Live for real-time assistance. The software also supports cross-device functions like "PC Connect" and "Touch to Share" for file sharing and screen mirroring.

=== Battery ===
The Oppo Find X9 has a silicon-carbon battery with a rated capacity of approximately 7025 mAh. The device supports wired fast charging using OPPO’s SUPERVOOC charging standard and also supports wireless charging and reverse charging for compatible accessories.

The Find X9 Ultra is powered by a 7050 mAh silicon-carbon battery and supports 100W wired and 50W wireless charging.

The Find X9s is powered by a 7025mAh battery with 80W fast charging.

== Release ==
The OPPO Find X9 series was first announced in China on 16 October 2025. The devices were later unveiled for global markets at a launch event held on 28 October 2025. Availability, configurations, and release dates varied by region following the initial introduction.

== Reception ==
Early reviews of the Oppo Find X9 described the device as a well-balanced flagship smartphone with strong performance and camera capabilities. Technology publication NotebookCheck noted that the device offers a fast processor, bright display, capable cameras, and powerful speakers, highlighting its overall performance across multiple categories. Reviews from technology websites such as 91mobiles described the Find X9 as a well-rounded flagship device with a comfortable form factor, strong performance, and reliable camera system, making it suitable for everyday use.

Other reviewers highlighted the device’s display quality, battery capacity, and overall balance between performance and features, positioning it competitively within the premium Android smartphone segment.
