= OnePlus 10 Pro =

Android-based smartphone manufactured by OnePlus

- Brand: OnePlus
- Manufacturer: OnePlus
- Type: Phablet
- Series: OnePlus
- First released: January 11, 2022; 4 years ago
- Availability by region: China: January 13, 2022 Europe: March 31, 2022 North America: March 31, 2022 India, South & North Asia (except China): March 31, 2022
- Predecessor: OnePlus 9 Pro
- Successor: OnePlus 11
- Related: OnePlus 10R; OnePlus 10T; Oppo Find X5
- Compatible networks: GSM / CDMA / HSPA / EVDO / LTE / 5G
- Form factor: Slate
- Colors: Volcanic Black, Emerald Forest, Panda White (Extreme Edition)
- Dimensions: 163 mm (6.4 in) H 73.9 mm (2.91 in) W 8.9 mm (0.35 in) D
- Weight: 200.5 g (7.07 oz)
- Operating system: Android 12 with ColorOS/OxygenOS 12.1
- System-on-chip: Qualcomm Snapdragon 8 Gen1 (4 nm)
- CPU: Octa-core (1x3.00 GHz Cortex-X2 & 3x2.50 GHz Cortex-A710 & 4x1.80 GHz Cortex-A510)
- GPU: Adreno 730
- Memory: 8 GB, 12 GB RAM
- Storage: 128 GB, 256 GB, 512 GB UFS 3.1
- Removable storage: Non-expandable
- SIM: Dual SIM (Nano-SIM, dual stand-by)
- Battery: Lithium polymer 5000 mAh
- Charging: SuperVOOC 2.0 Fast charging 80W (International) or 65W (North America); AirVOOC Fast wireless charging 50W; Reverse wireless charging 10W
- Rear camera: 48 MP, f/1.8, 23mm (wide), 1/1.43", 1.12 μm, multi-directional PDAF, Laser AF, OIS; 8 MP, f/2.4, 77mm (telephoto), 1.0 μm, PDAF, OIS, 3.3x optical zoom 50 MP, f/2.2, 14mm, 150˚ (ultrawide), 1/2.76", 0.64 μm, AF; Hasselblad Color Calibration, dual-LED dual-tone flash, auto-HDR, panorama, gyro-EIS; 8K@24fps, 4K@30/60/120fps, 1080p@30/60/240fps recording
- Front camera: 32 MP, f/2.2, (wide), 1/2.74", 0.8 μm Auto-HDR, gyro-EIS; 1080p@30fps recording
- Display: 6.7 in (170 mm), 108.4 cm^{2} (~90.0% screen-to-body ratio); 1440 x 3216 pixels, 20:9 ratio (~525 ppi density); LTPO2 Fluid AMOLED, 1B colors, 120Hz refresh rate, HDR10+
- External display: Always on Display
- Sound: Stereo speakers
- Connectivity: Wi-Fi 802.11 a/b/g/n/ac/6, dual-band, Wi-Fi Direct, hotspot Bluetooth 5.2, A2DP, LE, aptX HD
- Data inputs: USB Type-C 3.1; Sensors: Fingerprint scanner (under display, optical); Accelerometer; Gyroscope; Proximity sensor; Compass; Color spectrum; Dual-band GNSS (GPS/GLONASS/BeiDou/Galileo)
- Water resistance: IP68 dust/water resistant - T-Mobile US only (not for use underwater, liquid damage is not covered under warranty)
- Model: NE2210
- Website: www.oneplus.com/10-pro

The OnePlus 10 Pro 5G is a high-end Android-based smartphone manufactured by OnePlus, unveiled on January 11, 2022. Succeeding the OnePlus 9 Pro, the phone also features upgraded cameras developed with Hasselblad.

OxygenOS 16 (based on Android 16) was released for the device in Q1 2026.

Preceded by OnePlus 9 Pro	OnePlus 10 Pro; 2022	Succeeded by OnePlus 11
