= OnePlus 12 =

Android smartphone

- Brand: OnePlus
- First released: December 11, 2023; 2 years ago
- Predecessor: OnePlus 11
- Successor: OnePlus 13
- Compatible networks: 2G, 3G, 4G, 4G LTE, 5G NR
- Form factor: Slate
- Colors: Flowy Emerald; Silky Black
- Dimensions: H: 164.3 mm (6.47 in) W: 75.8 mm (2.98 in) D: 9.2 mm (0.36 in)
- Weight: 220 g (7.8 oz)
- Operating system: Android 14 with OxygenOS 14 or ColorOS 14 (China), upgradable to Android 17 with ColorOS 17
- System-on-chip: Qualcomm Snapdragon 8 Gen 3
- CPU: Octa cores: 1x Cortex-X4 (3.3 GHz); 3x Cortex-A720 (3.2 GHz); 2x Cortex-A720 (3.0 GHz); 2x Cortex-A520 (2.3 GHz)
- GPU: Adreno 750
- Modem: Qualcomm X75 5G
- Memory: 256GB: 12GB RAM; 512GB: 16GB RAM
- Storage: UFS 4.0: 256GB, 512GB
- Battery: Li-Po 5400 mAh (Dual-cell 2,700 mAh, non-removable)
- Charging: International: 100W wired, PD, 100% in 26 min, 50W AirVOOC; USA: 80W wired, PD, 100% in 30 min
- Rear camera: Triple-Camera Setup; Primary: Sony LYT-808; 50 MP, f/1.6, 23mm, 1/1.43", 1.12μm, multi-directional PDAF, OIS; Periscope Telephoto: OmniVision OV64B; 64 MP, f/2.6, 70mm, 1/2.0", 0.7μm, PDAF, OIS, 3x optical zoom; Ultrawide: Sony IMX 581; 48 MP, f/2.2, 14mm, 114˚, 1/2.0", 0.8μm, PDAF; Features: Hasselblad Color Calibration, color spectrum sensor, Dual-LED flash, HDR, panorama; Video: 8K@24fps, 4K@30/60fps, 1080p@30/60/240/480fps, Auto HDR, gyro-EIS, Dolby Vision
- Front camera: Sony IMX 615; 32 MP, f/2.4, 21mm (wide), 1/2.74", 0.8μm; Features: HDR, panorama; Video: 4K@30fps, 1080p@30fps, gyro-EIS
- Display: Type: LTPO AMOLED, 1B colors, 120Hz, Dolby Vision, HDR10+, 600 nits (typ), 1600 nits (HBM), 4500 nits (peak); Size: 6.82 in (173 mm) ~90.8% screen-to-body ratio; Resolution: 1440 x 3168 pixels; Protection: Corning Gorilla Glass Victus 2
- Connectivity: Bluetooth 5.4, A2DP, LE, aptX HD, LHDC NFC GPS (L1+L5), GLONASS (G1), BDS (B1I+B1c+B2a), GALILEO (E1+E5a), QZSS (L1+L5), NavIC WiFi 802.11 a/b/g/n/ac/6e/7, tri-band, Wi-Fi Direct
- Water resistance: IP65
- Model: PJD110: China; CPH2573: India; CPH2581: EU; CPH2583: North America
- Website: www.oneplus.com/us/12

The OnePlus 12 is an Android-based smartphone manufactured by OnePlus. It was announced on December 5, 2023, and made available on December 11, 2023.

== Software & support ==
OnePlus 12 ships with Oxygen OS 14 (Android 14). OnePlus claims to provide 4 years of Android updates and 5 years of security patches.

Since October 30th, 2024 some owners of OnePlus 12 could optionally receive a beta version of OxygenOS 15 (Android 15) before the final release. Oxygen OS 15 includes many new features, among those are updated UI interface, theft protection, easier to share files with iPhone, better multitasking and drag-and-drop to other apps.

OxygenOS 15 (Android 15) also brought new AI features:

- AI Detail Boost allows quality improvements pixelated photos after cropping
- AI Unblur
- AI Reflection Eraser — glare/reflection removal
- AI Notes to get summaries, filler-free voice transcripts, tone adjustment (formal/casual)

Android 15 (OxygenOS 15) stable version started to roll out globally since November 11th, 2024.

On November 28th, 2024 OnePlus started shipping OxygenOS 15.0.0.305 which brings AI features which were not included in the original Android 15 update earlier this month.

OnePlus 12 has got official support of LineageOS in September 2025.

OxygenOS 16 (based on Android 16) was released for the device in November 2025.

2026 February system update B40P02 (BRB1EX01 for phones and BRB3EX01 for tablets) brought a lot of new features. The Photos app received gesture animations and optimized thumbnail parsing. Built-in video editor now supports cutting, splitting, multi-clip stitching, text overlays, speed adjustment, cropping. AI Eraser now producer much cleaner results. Remove reflections feature handles better glare in documents and portraits with glasses. Auto straighten features allows fixing skewed buildings and portraits.

ColorOS 17 (Android 17) is expected to be rolled out in November 2026.

== Hardware ==
=== Build ===
OnePlus 12 uses an aluminium frame and has a curved display. The rear part of the phone uses etched glass. The OnePlus 12 has an IP65 rating. The phone's performance in 3DMark's Wildlife Extreme test was twice as high as that of the Pixel 8 Pro.

=== Storage ===
The OnePlus 12 has 16 GB of RAM and 512 GB of storage. OnePlus also offers a 24 GB / 1 TB variant, but it is not available in all regions.

=== Battery ===
According to GSM Arena OnePlus 12 has a better battery life than the previous model OnePlus 11 (5,000mAh capacity in OnePlus 11), OnePlus 12 works ~27% longer from a full battery in comparison with OnePlus 11 according to tests.

Notebookcheck reported that the OnePlus 12 has a better battery runtime than OnePlus 11 in all 3 tests: 1965 minutes vs 1680 minutes in Reader/Idle test, 1820 minutes vs 1380 minutes in H.264 video playback test, 1237 minutes vs 803 minutes in Wi-Fi websurfing test.

OnePlus 12 and Samsung S24 Ultra have achieved similar active use score according to tests. However, in terms of charging speed OnePlus 12 uses 100W charger and the battery can be charged to 100% in 24 minutes, while the Samsung Galaxy S24 Ultra uses 45W charger, and it takes 65 minutes to charge the battery to 100%.

=== Camera system ===
Specs from the official website page
	Main	Telephoto	Ultra-wide	Front
Sensor	Sony's LYT-808	OmniVision OV64B with 3X optical zoom, 6X in-sensor zoom	Sony IMX581	Sony IMX615
Sensor Size	1/1.4"	1/2"	1/2"	1/2.74"
Megapixels	50	64	48	32
Pixel Size	1.12 μm	0.7 μm	0.8 μm	0.8 μm
Lens Quantity	7P	4P	6P	5P
ALC lens coating	Yes	Yes	No	No
Optical Image Stabilization	Yes	Yes	No	No
Electronic Image Stabilization	Yes	Yes	Yes	Yes
Focal Length	23 mm equivalent	70 mm equivalent (3X), 145 mm equivalent (6X)	16 mm equivalent	21 mm equivalent
Aperture	ƒ/1.6	ƒ/2.6	ƒ/2.2	ƒ/2.4
Field of View	85°	?	114°	90°
Autofocus	Yes	Yes	Yes	Fixed Focus

=== Other ===
OnePlus 12 has an IR blaster for remotely controlling consumer electronics such as TVs, home A/V components and many other devices.

== Reception ==
CNN praised the OnePlus 12's $800 price tag as being great value for what the phone offered, and able to compete with other flagship phones.

Preceded by OnePlus 11	OnePlus 12; 2023	Succeeded by OnePlus 13
