= List of OnePlus products =

The following is a list of products that Chinese consumer electronics manufacturer OnePlus launched.

== Smartphones ==
=== OnePlus Series ===
==== OnePlus 1 ====
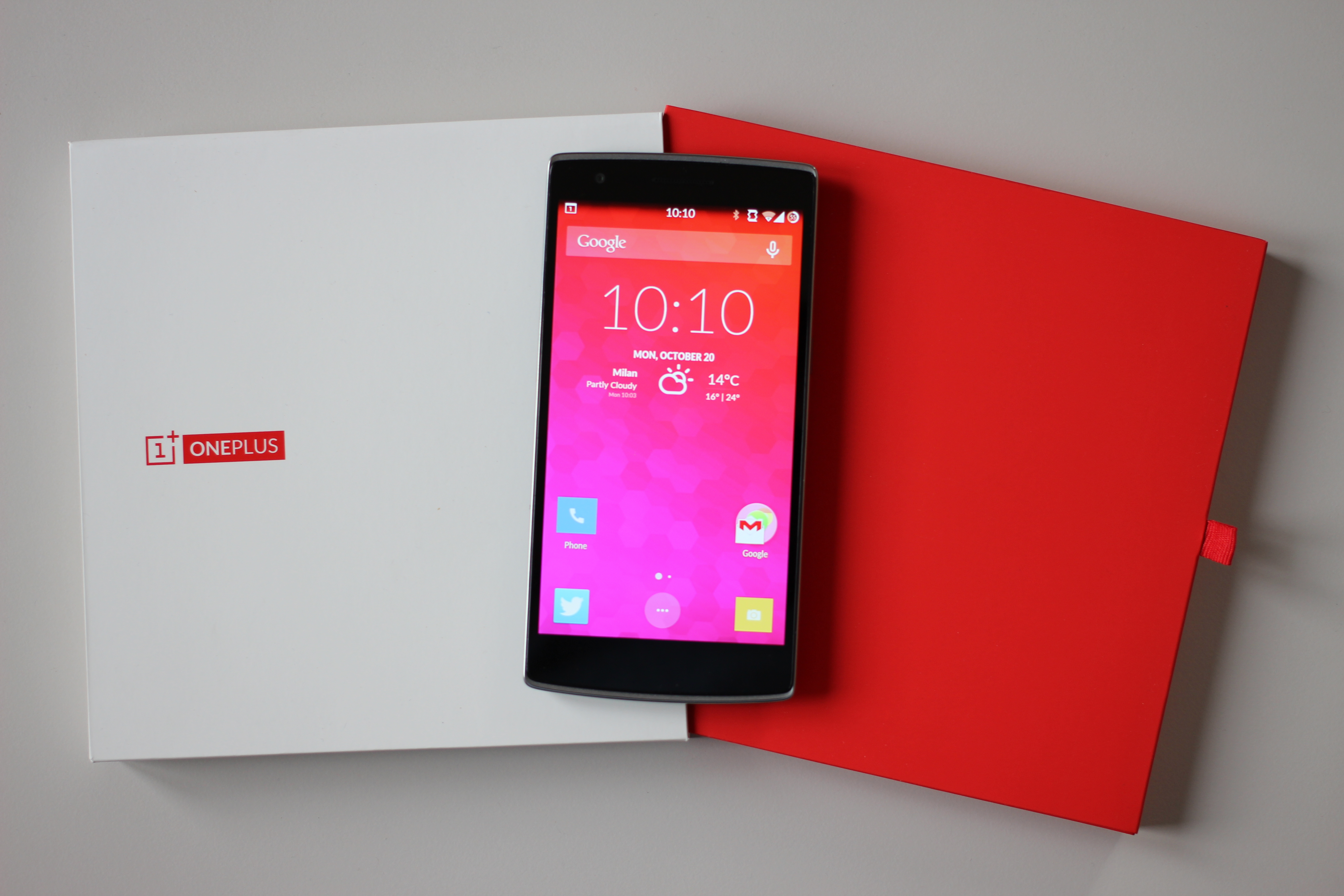
OnePlus One

The company's first product was the anticipated OnePlus One. It was unveiled on 22 April 2014, and was claimed as the "2014 Flagship Killer". The smartphone had comparable, and in some ways better, specifications to other flagship phones of the year, while being sold at a significantly lower price at $299 for the 16 GB version or $349 for the 64 GB version.

Criticisms of OnePlus One included the omission of the microSD slot. Lack of storage bottlenecked the system and lack of a removable battery gave a frustrating experience to some users. Input inconsistencies such as a flawed voice control system and oversensitive gesture shortcuts also thwarted the experience. Some units had an issue where a yellow band would appear at the bottom of the display. This issue was not covered under warranty.

==== OnePlus 2 ====
The OnePlus 2 was the successor to the company's successful first phone. It was unveiled a little over a year after the OnePlus One, on 27 July 2015. The company promoted it as the "2016 Flagship killer". There were very high expectations for the second generation OnePlus phones, partly because the company managed to create a high amount of hype for the then-upcoming phone.

The OnePlus 2 had specifications comparable to other flagship phones of the time, including the Qualcomm Snapdragon 810, though OnePlus had decided to leave out an NFC chip, as it didn't see mobile payment being an essential feature at the time. The phone was also one of the first Android devices to use a USB-C port over the older micro USB port.

In advance of the OnePlus 2 launch, OnePlus assured customers that obtaining invites would be easier, and handsets would ship a lot quicker than with the OnePlus One. However, in a public apology, Carl Pei admitted the company had "messed up" the launch, and that OnePlus "only began shipping meaningful quantities [the week of 10 September 2015], nearly a month after [the] initial targeted shipping date."

Despite promising 24 months of software updates, and telling consumers that the OnePlus 2 would be updated to Android 7 "Nougat", it was eventually confirmed that this was not to happen, leaving the device on the older Android 6.0.1.

==== OnePlus X ====
Shortly after the launch of the OnePlus 2, OnePlus co-founder Carl Pei hinted at the launch of a new device at the end of 2015 when interviewed at one of the popup events in New York City. Being the successor to OnePlus 2, OnePlus X was OnePlus' entrance to the budget phone market, at 5 inches instead of the One and 2's 5.5 inches. The phone was unveiled on 29 October 2015. The phone was sold for $249, and consisted mostly of the same internal components as the year and half old OnePlus One, but had an AMOLED display. The OnePlus X comes preloaded with Oxygen OS version 2.1.2, the OnePlus' build of Android 5.1.1 "Lollipop".

==== OnePlus 3 ====
The OnePlus 3 was unveiled on 14 June 2016 as a successor to OnePlus 2 in the main series. This was the first OnePlus device to be not part of the invite system. The 3 was the company's first "metal unibody" phone and launched with a Qualcomm Snapdragon 820, 6 GB of RAM and 64 GB of UFS 2.0 storage. The phone was well regarded amongst critics, mostly for its low price and high specifications.

==== OnePlus 3T ====
The OnePlus 3T was unveiled on 15 November 2016 as a minor upgrade to the still relatively new OnePlus 3. The upgrade consisted the use of a newer SoC; the Qualcomm Snapdragon 820 was replaced with the Snapdragon 821. Also introduced were a higher-capacity battery, 64 or 128 GB of storage and 16 MP front-facing camera. The phone launched in the US on 22 November 2016 and in the EU on 28 November 2016.

==== OnePlus 5 ====
The OnePlus 5 was unveiled on 20 June 2017 as the successor to the OnePlus 3, skipping the number 4, because in China, 4 is an unlucky number. It launched with a Qualcomm Snapdragon 835, a dual-lens camera setup, up to 8 GB RAM, and up to 128 GB of storage. It was released in two colours: Midnight Black and Slate Gray. A third limited edition colour, Soft Gold was released on 7 August 2017. Another special edition colour was launched on 20 September 2017, in collaboration with Castelbajac.

==== OnePlus 5T ====
The OnePlus 5T was unveiled on 16 November 2017, as the successor to the OnePlus 5. It features the same Qualcomm Snapdragon 835 SoC and storage options as its predecessor. Notable features include a larger 6" 18:9 display, a new "Face Unlock" facial recognition method, and an improved dual-lens camera.

The device which came out of the box running Android 7 Nougat recently received the last major update based on Android 10 Q.

==== OnePlus 6 ====
OnePlus opened forums for the OnePlus 6 in April 2018 and launched the device on 17 May 2018 with sales starting on 22 May 2018. The phone notably features a display notch and water resistance (although not IP Code rated). The smartphone was the first from the company to offer a 256 GB inbuilt storage variant. It has a 6.28 inches FHD+ Optic AMOLED Display. It comes with a 16 MP primary sensor with OIS and EIS and 20 MP depth sensor for portrait shots at the back and is able to record at 4K resolution 60 FPS video and 16 MP front camera with EIS. It features a 3300 mA⋅h battery and came with a 20 watts OnePlus Dash Charge. It was available in 4 colours, "Mirror" black, "Midnight" black, "Silk" white and red. It was powered by the Qualcomm Snapdragon 845 and Adreno 630.

==== OnePlus 6T ====
The OnePlus 6T was unveiled on 29 October 2018. It launched with a Qualcomm Snapdragon 845, a dual-lens camera setup, up to 8 GB RAM, and up to 256 GB of storage. It also features a larger 6.41" Optic AMOLED display, and launched with OxygenOS—based on Android Pie (Android 9). The camera has a 'Nightscape' mode which uses a longer exposure time to capture better photos in poor lighting conditions.It became the first OnePlus phone to come with an in-display fingerprint scanner.

OnePlus set a Guinness World Record title of "the most people unboxing a phone simultaneously" on the launch of OnePlus 6T.

In the beginning, OnePlus 6T users reported unusual battery drain issue, which got fixed after a few days of usage. The reason to this is still unknown.

==== OnePlus 7 and OnePlus 7 Pro ====
The OnePlus 7 and OnePlus 7 Pro were launched on May 14, 2019, in Bangalore, New York, and London and went on sale starting May 17. The OnePlus 7 Pro and OnePlus 7 are the first phones to go on sale with Universal Flash Storage (UFS) 3.0 storage. They are powered by Qualcomm's Snapdragon 855 SoC. Like the predecessor, they come with an optical in-display fingerprint sensor. The front camera has a 16 MP sensor. They were launched with Android 9.0 Pie.

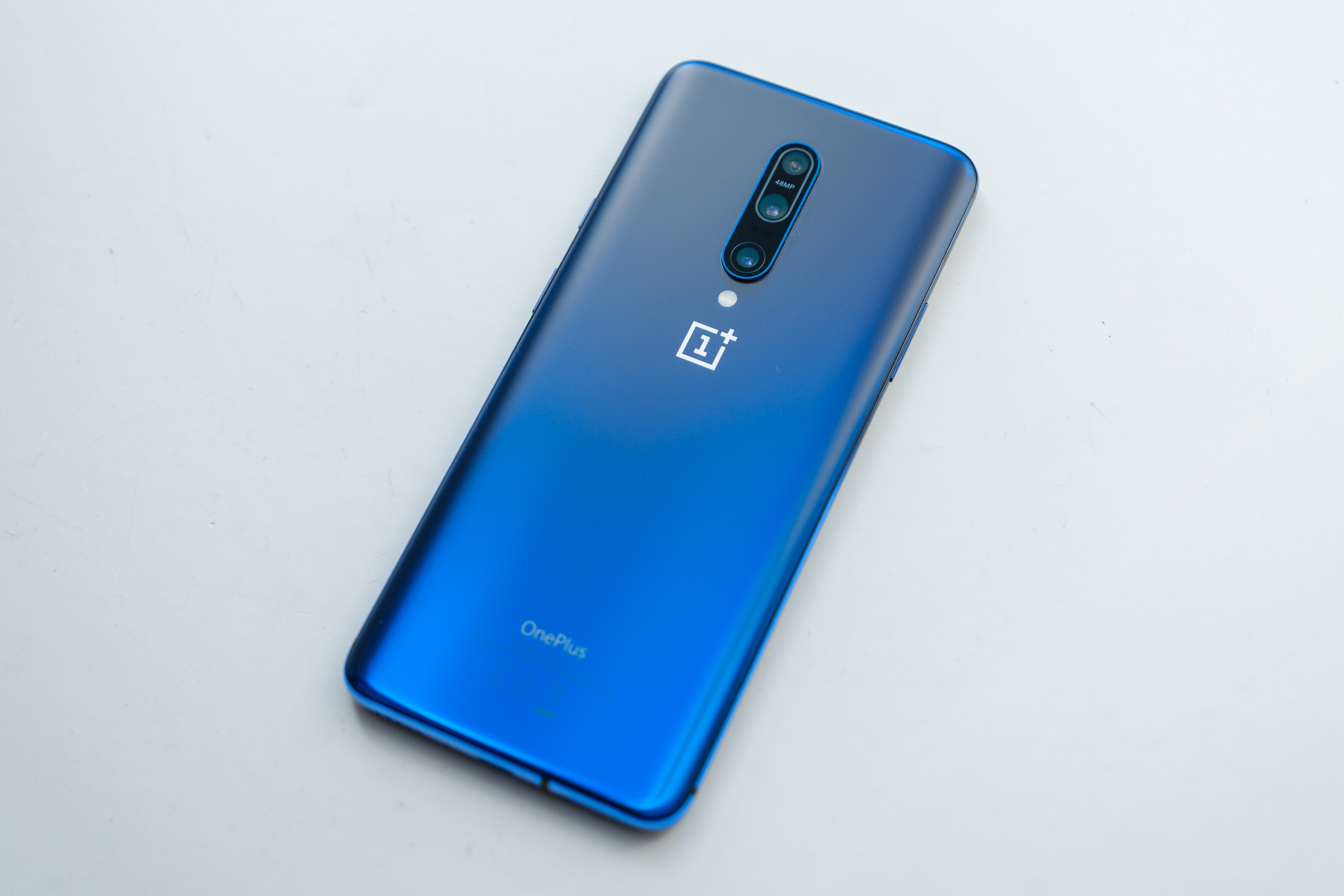
OnePlus 7 Pro

The OnePlus 7 Pro features a curved edge-to-edge 6.67" AMOLED display with a 3K resolution and 90 Hz refresh rate. It comes in three variants: 6 GB RAM with 128 GB storage, 8 GB RAM with 256 GB storage and 12 GB RAM option with 256 GB storage. The OnePlus 7 Pro also features a 4000 mA⋅h non-removable battery along with Warp Charge 30 technology.

The budget OnePlus 7 which was launched with the flagship Pro version, comes in two colors, "Mirror" grey and Nebula blue. It is available in 6 GB RAM with 128 GB of internal storage, or 8 GB RAM with 128 or 256 GB of internal storage. It features a 6.41 inches FHD+ Optic Amoled Display (2340×1080 pixels resolution). The rear camera has a 48 MP Sony IMX 586 primary sensor along with a 5 MP depth sensor.

==== OnePlus 7T and OnePlus 7T Pro ====
The OnePlus 7T was officially presented in New Delhi on September 26, 2019, and was available to order on September 28. The OnePlus 7T Pro was unveiled two weeks later. The OnePlus 7T is the successor to the 7 that was released 5 months prior for the European and Asian market, and to the 6T for the American market where the OnePlus 7 wasn't sold. It features a new form-factor compared to its predecessors, with a 20:9 aspect ratio instead of 19.5:9. This allowed for OnePlus to make the phone slightly taller than the older 6T and 7, while keeping the same width. OnePlus also included the 90 Hz Fluid AMOLED display previously found on the OnePlus 7 Pro. While OnePlus did keep the resolution at 2400×1080 pixels, the screen was one of its primary selling points. While the OnePlus 7T is considered a significant upgrade compared to the 7, the 7T Pro is a subtle upgrade over the 7 Pro. It features the same display, same body, same camera system; the main changes being faster charging, faster processor and a slightly quieter pop-up camera.

Both phones are powered by Qualcomm's Snapdragon 855+ (7 nm) SoC and feature the same in-display fingerprint scanner found on the OnePlus 7 Series. Only one variant was available for each phone: 8 GB RAM with 128 GB storage for the 7T (with another 256 GB storage variant for the Indian market only), and 8 GB RAM with 256 GB storage for the 7T Pro. Both have a slightly superior battery compared to their predecessors, the 7T included a 3800 mAh non-removable battery (4085 mAh for the 7T Pro) alongside Warp Charge 30T technology, which allows them to be fully charged in just under an hour. The OnePlus 7T had a new camera system, featuring the same primary and wide-angle lenses, though adding a third 2x telephoto lens (instead of 3x for the 7 Pro and 7T Pro). Both also feature a new macro mode, allowing them to capture pictures up to 2.5 cm from to the subject. The more affordable OnePlus 7T is available in 2 colors, "Frosted" silver or "Glacier" blue, and the 7T Pro in "Haze" blue, all being matte glass finishes. Both were the first phones to ship with Android 10 and OxygenOS 10.0 out-of-the-box.

==== OnePlus 8 and OnePlus 8 Pro ====
The OnePlus 8 and OnePlus 8 Pro were unveiled on April 14, 2020, and released on April 21 in Europe and April 29 in the United States. The 8 Pro is the first OnePlus phone to have wireless charging (Warp Charge 30 W). All 8 Pro models have water resistance, although for the 8 it is present only on carrier models. The 8 and 8 Pro have a circular cutout in the upper left-hand corner of the display for the front-facing camera. This was necessary to achieve the IP68 rating, as the pop-up camera on the 7 Pro and 7T Pro did not allow for water resistance. Like the 7T series, both use Fluid AMOLED displays with HDR10+ support. However, a curved display is now used on both phones, whereas the 7T had a flat display and the 7T Pro had a curved display. The 8 has a 6.55-inch 1080p 20:9 screen with a 90 Hz refresh rate, while the 8 Pro has a larger 6.78-inch 1440p 19.8:9 screen with a 120 Hz refresh rate. The 8 Pro is one of the first smartphones able to display 1 billion colors using a 30-bit panel.

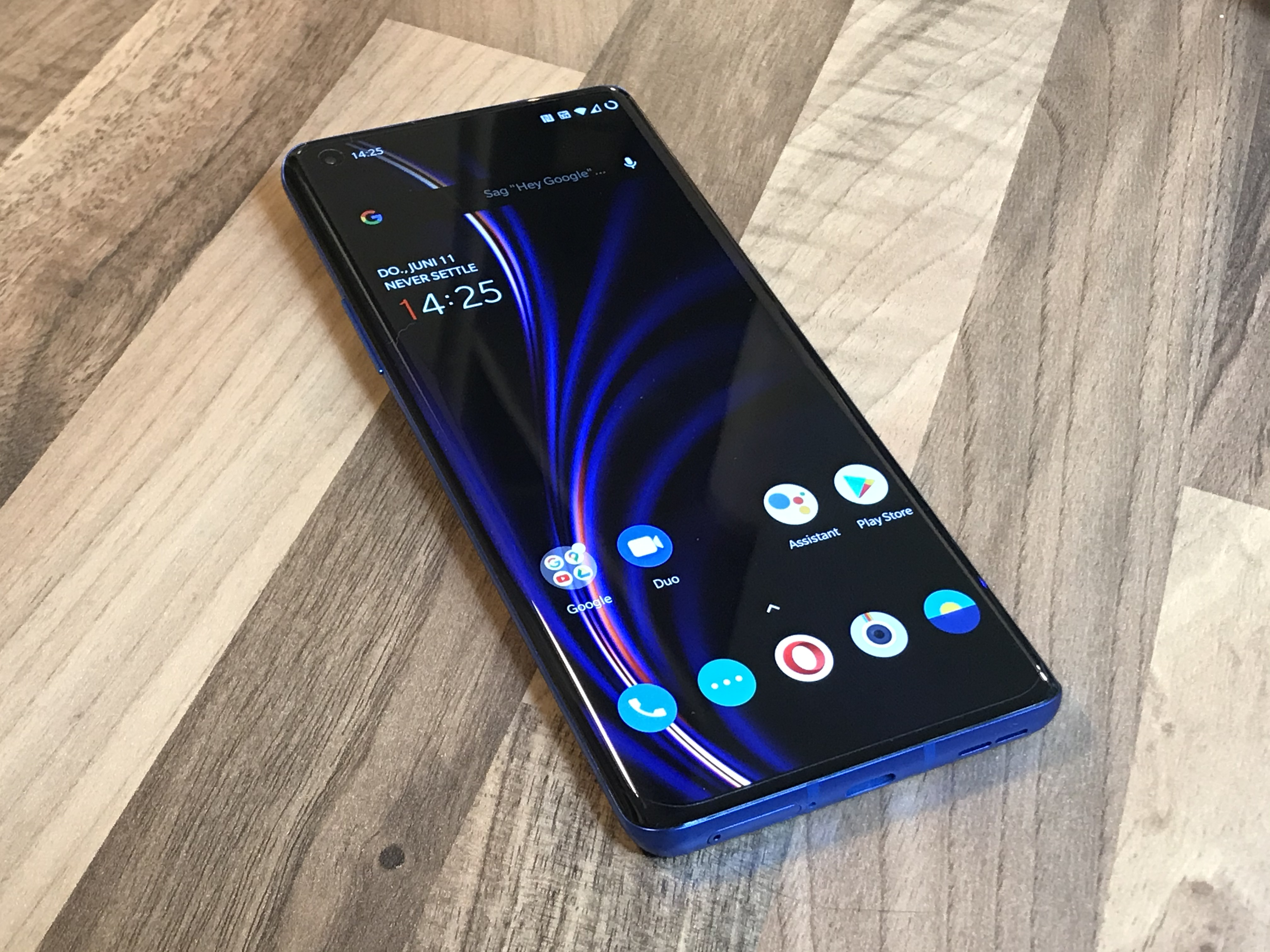
OnePlus 8 Pro

Both phones are powered by the Qualcomm Snapdragon 865 processor and Adreno 650 GPU. The battery capacity has been increased to 4300 mAh on the 8 and 4510 mAh on the 8 Pro. Storage and RAM options are shared between the two, with 8 or 12 GB of RAM and 128 or 256 GB of non-expandable UFS 3.0 storage. The 8 has LPDDR4X RAM while the 8 Pro has faster, more efficient LPDDR5 RAM. The camera system has been changed to further differentiate the 8 and 8 Pro. The 8's camera array consists of a 48 MP wide sensor, a 16 MP ultrawide sensor, and a 2 MP macro sensor, while the 8 Pro's camera array consists of a 48 MP wide sensor, a 48 MP ultrawide sensor and an 8 MP telephoto sensor, with an additional 5 MP "Color Filter Camera" that enables one- or two- color filters within the standard shooting mode. On 19 May, OnePlus announced that they would temporarily disable the colour filter camera on the OnePlus 8 Pro in China with an upcoming software update, for creating privacy concerns online. Unlike the 7T, the 8 does not have a telephoto camera or autofocus on the ultrawide camera, which are now exclusive to the 8 Pro. The front camera on both uses a 16 MP sensor. Along with facial recognition, the optical in-display fingerprint scanner is carried over from the 7 series and 7T series. Both are available in Onyx Black (glossy) and Glacial Green (matte), while the 8 Pro has its own Ultramarine Blue (matte) finish. The 8 has two additional colors, a Polar Silver (matte) finish exclusive to the Verizon model and an Interstellar Glow (glossy) finish exclusive to the T-Mobile model. Like the 7T series, they ship with Android 10 and OxygenOS 10.0 pre-installed.

==== OnePlus 8T ====
The OnePlus 8T was unveiled on October 14, 2020, and was released on October 20 in Europe and October 23 in the United States. The version sold by T-Mobile US is branded as the OnePlus 8T+. The 8T breaks from the format started by the 7 series; OnePlus stated that it has no plans to sell a Pro model. The overall design is similar to the 8, with a circular display cutout for the front-facing camera. It features the same Fluid AMOLED with HDR10+ support but reverts to a flat display. The display specifications are largely identical, with a 6.55-inch 1080p 20:9 screen; however the refresh rate has been increased from 90 Hz to 120 Hz, matching the 8 Pro.

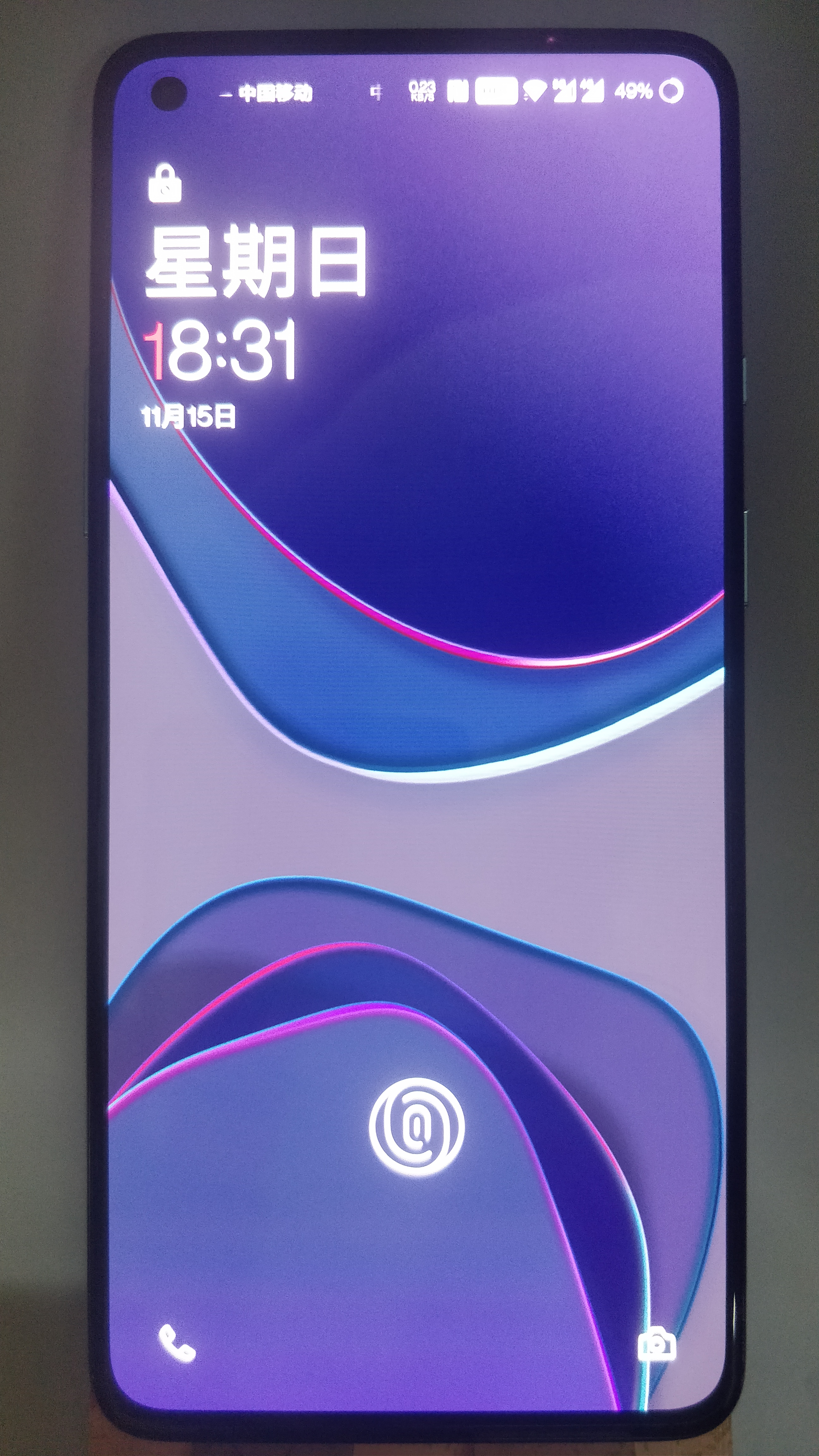
OnePlus 8T

Like the 8, the 8T is powered by the Qualcomm Snapdragon 865 processor and Adreno 650 GPU. The battery capacity is 4500 mAh, with a dual-cell design. It marks the debut of Warp Charge 65, although it does not support wireless charging. Storage and RAM options are carried over from the 8, with 8 or 12 GB of LPDDR4X RAM and 128 or 256 of non-expandable storage. The camera module has a new design, the array consisting of a 48 MP wide sensor, 16 MP ultrawide sensor, a 5 MP macro sensor and a 2 MP monochrome sensor, while the front camera uses a 16 MP sensor. Biometric options remain the same, with facial recognition and an optical in-display fingerprint scanner. The unlocked version supports dual SIM cards but lacks an IP rating; the T-Mobile US version supports only one SIM card, but has an IP68 rating. It is available in Aquamarine Green (glossy) and Lunar Silver (matte), and is the first OnePlus device to ship with Android 11 and OxygenOS 11 pre-installed.

==== OnePlus 9 and 9 Pro ====
The OnePlus 9 and 9 Pro were unveiled on March 23, 2021. The 9 and 9 Pro are the first OnePlus phones to use Hasselblad optics. Both phones have fluid AMOLED displays with HDR10+ support and a 120 Hz refresh rate; the 9 has a flat 6.55-inch 1080p screen, while the 9 Pro has a curved 6.7-inch 1440p screen. The 9 Pro uses an LTPO backplane which can dynamically adjust the refresh rate and display 1 billion colors.

Both phones are powered by the Qualcomm Snapdragon 888 processor and Adreno 660 GPU. Memory configurations are unchanged, with either 8 GB RAM and 128 GB UFS or 12 GB RAM and 256 GB UFS. The battery capacity is 4500 mAh for both phones, and both support Warp Charge 65T. The 9 supports wireless charging in certain regions but is limited to 15 W, whereas the 9 Pro can charge at 50 W. Both phones have upgraded cameras and redesigned camera modules. Both phones have a 48 MP wide sensor with 12-bit RAW color capture and 8K video, and a 50 MP ultrawide sensor utilizing a new freeform lens. The 9 Pro has an additional 8 MP telephoto sensor which offers 3.3x optical zoom.

The OnePlus 9R was launched on March 23, 2021, alongside the OnePlus 9 and 9 Pro. Like the OnePlus 9, this phone also has a flat 6.55" AMOLED display with support for HDR10+ and a 120 Hz refresh rate. However, this phone does not use Hasselblad optics. This phone is powered by the Snapdragon 870 processor, paired with the Adreno 650 GPU. The device comes with either 8 or 12 GB of RAM, and either 128 or 256 GB of storage. The battery capacity is 4500 mAh. The phone supports fast 65 W wired charging, but has no support for wireless charging. The camera setup is identical to the one found on the OnePlus 8T. It consists of a 48-megapixel primary camera, accompanied by a 16 MP ultrawide camera, a 5 MP macro camera, and a 2 MP monochrome camera. The front-facing camera has a 16 MP sensor. The rear primary camera supports 4K@60 video recording, while the front-facing camera supports up to 1080p@30 video recording.

The OnePlus 9RT was launched on October 13, 2021, as a successor to the 9R. It has a slightly larger 6.62" 1080p AMOLED display with support for HDR10+ and a 120 Hz refresh rate, as well as a 600 Hz touch sampling rate. The memory configurations are the same, with either 8 or 12 GB of RAM, and either 128 or 256 GB of storage. The battery capacity is also unchanged at 4500 mAh, and supports Warp Charge 65T. The camera setup is unique, with a 50 MP wide sensor, accompanied by a 16 MP ultrawide camera and a 2 MP macro camera.

==== OnePlus 10 Pro ====
OnePlus 10 Pro was launched on 11 January 2022. The phone comes with 120 Hz LTPO 2.0 AMOLED display. OnePlus 10 Pro is powered by octa-core Qualcomm Snapdragon 8 Gen 1 processor. OnePlus 10 Pro supports proprietary super fast charging with 5000 mAh battery. OnePlus 10 Pro comes with 2nd-Gen Hasselblad 50 megapixels triple camera setup. The OnePlus 10 Pro runs ColorOS 12.1 in China or OxygenOS in the US, both are based on Android 12 and comes with 8 GB and 12 GB RAM and 128 GB, 256 GB and 512 GB storage options.

==== OnePlus 10T and Ace Pro ====
OnePlus 10T was launched on August 3, 2022, and a successor to OnePlus 9. This phone shares the same design with OnePlus 10 Pro, and comes with 120 Hz Fluid AMOLED, Qualcomm Snapdragon 8+ Gen 1 (4 nm) processor, with 50 MP Sony IMX766 main camera. On the front, It has 16 MP wide camera. OnePlus 10T comes with under-display fingerprint and color spectrum features. The smartphone has 4800 mAh Li-po non-removable battery and 150 W wired fast charging (125 W for 120 V sockets).

==== OnePlus 11 and 11R ====
OnePlus 11 was launched on January 9, 2023, in China, and in other countries on February 7, 2023. This phone comes with Qualcomm Snapdragon 8 Gen 2 processor, 50 MP Sony IMX890 main camera and 100 W charging. Another variant, OnePlus 11R was also launched along with the OnePlus 11 that comes with slightly downgraded specifications. It features a Snapdragon 8+ Gen 1 4 nm Mobile Platform with Adreno 730 GPU and almost similar other features like the 11.

==== OnePlus 12 and 12R ====
OnePlus 12 was launched in December 2023 in China, and in other countries on January 23, 2024. It has a 6.82-inch, 1440 x 3168, 120 Hz screen with up to 4,500 nits of brightness. There is a 12-gigabyte RAM / 256-gigabyte storage model, and a 16-gigabyte RAM / 512-gigabyte storage model.

==== OnePlus 13 ====
OnePlus 13 was launched on October 31, 2024, in China, and in other countries January 7, 2025. The phone features a Qualcomm SM8750-AB Snapdragon 8 Elite with Adreno 830 GPU. The screen featured in the 13 is the same size, resolution, and brightness as the 12. The key feature of the 13 is the 6,000 mAh silicon carbide battery.

==== OnePlus 15 ====
OnePlus 15 was launched on October 27, 2025, in China, and in other countries November 13, 2025. It includes a 6.78 inches, 112.4 cm^{2} , 165 Hz display with a downgrade in resolution to 1272 x 2772 pixels. It has a 7300 mAh silicon carbide battery with 120W SuperVOOC fast charging. The cameras in the OnePlus 15 feature some downgrades from the OnePlus 13. It has a Qualcomm Snapdragon 8 Elite Gen 5 processor and an Adreno™ 840 GPU.

==== OnePlus 16 ====
OnePlus 16 was launched in China on October 12, 2026, with a suggested retail price of CN¥5,999 for the base 12GB+256GB configuration, sold at a first-sale promotional price of CN¥5,699. It has a 6.78-inch OLED display running at 165 Hz by default (up to 185 Hz in supported games), a Qualcomm Snapdragon 8 Elite Extreme Gen 6 processor, and a 9,000 mAh battery, up from the OnePlus 15's 7,300 mAh, with 100W wired and 50W wireless charging. As with the OnePlus 15, OnePlus has not announced a global release.

==== OnePlus Nord ====
The first OnePlus Nord was unveiled on July 21, 2020, and released on August 4 in Europe and India. The Nord is the first midrange smartphone from OnePlus since the OnePlus X. It supports Warp Charge 30T. Additionally, the Nord has a single loudspeaker in place of the 8 and 8 Pro's stereo loudspeakers. The Nord has a display cutout in the upper left hand corner like the 8 and 8 Pro, which is elongated to accommodate the dual front-facing cameras. It uses a Fluid AMOLED display with a 1080p 20:9 resolution, HDR10+ support and 90 Hz refresh rate like the 8, with a smaller 6.44-inch screen and a flat display.

The Nord is powered by the Snapdragon 765G, Adreno 620 GPU and supports 5G. Battery capacity is at 4115 mAh. It is available in three non-expandable storage configurations, one being exclusive to the Indian market. The camera array consists of a 48 MP wide sensor, an 8 MP ultrawide sensor, a 5 MP depth sensor, and a 2 MP macro sensor. The front has a 32 MP wide sensor and an 8 MP ultrawide sensor. Facial recognition and an optical in-display fingerprint scanner are present as well. It is available in Blue Marble and Gray Onyx, and ships with Android 10 and OxygenOS 10.5 pre-installed.

==== OnePlus Nord N10 5G and Nord N100 ====
The OnePlus Nord N10 5G and Nord N100 were announced on October 26, 2020, as lower priced options to the original Nord. Unlike the Nord, both are sold in North America as well as Europe.

The Nord N10 5G is an entry-level device. Compared to the Nord, it has a 6.49-inch display of the same resolution at 90 Hz, however it is an LCD rather than an AMOLED. As a result, the fingerprint scanner is rear-mounted in place of an optical unit. It is powered by the Snapdragon 690 and Adreno 619L GPU, and is available with 128 GB UFS / 6 GB RAM. Notably, it has a microSDXC card slot for expandable storage, stereo speakers, and a 3.5 mm audio jack, none of which are on the Nord. The rear camera array uses a 64 MP sensor instead of a 48 MP sensor for the wide lens, and has an 8 MP ultrawide sensor and two 2 MP depth and macro sensors. The front camera has a single 16 MP sensor lacking the Nord's ultrawide lens. The battery has a capacity of 4300 mAh, and supports Warp Charge 30. Its only color is Midnight Ice, and it ships with Android 10 and Oxygen OS 10.5 pre-installed.

The Nord N100 is a low-end device. Like the Nord N10 5G, it has a rear-mounted fingerprint scanner, a microSDXC card slot, stereo speakers and a 3.5 mm audio jack. It features a 6.52-inch 720p IPS LCD with a 90 Hz refresh rate, is powered by the Snapdragon 460 and Adreno 610 GPU, and has 64 GB UFS / 4 GB RAM. The rear camera array has a 13 MP wide sensor and two 2 MP macro and depth sensors, and is limited to recording 1080p video; the front camera has an 8 MP sensor. The battery has a capacity of 5000 mAh, and charges at a maximum of 18 W. Its only color is Midnight Frost, and it ships with Android 10 and Oxygen OS 10.5 pre-installed.

==== OnePlus Nord CE 5G and Nord N200 5G ====
The OnePlus Nord CE (Core Edition) 5G and Nord N200 5G announced on June 10, 2021, and June 21, 2021, respectively. The Nord CE 5G is sold in Asia and Europe, while the Nord N200 5G is exclusive to North America.

The Nord CE 5G is positioned between the Nord N10 5G and the Nord. It has a 6.43-inch 1080p AMOLED at 90 Hz, an optical fingerprint scanner, and is powered by the Snapdragon 750G and Adreno 619 GPU with three storage configurations. The rear camera array uses a 64 MP wide sensor, an 8 MP ultrawide sensor and a 2 MP depth sensor; the front camera has a 16 MP sensor. The battery has a capacity of 4500 mAh, and supports Warp Charge 30T+. It is available in Blue Void, Charcoal Ink and Silver Ray, and it ships with Android 11 and OxygenOS 11 pre-installed.

The Nord N200 5G is the successor to the Nord N100. It has a 6.49-inch 1080p LCD at 90 Hz, a side-mounted fingerprint scanner, and is powered by the Snapdragon 480 and Adreno 619 GPU. It is otherwise similar to the Nord N100, with the same storage, rear cameras, and battery. Its only color is Blue Quantum, and it ships with Android 11 and OxygenOS 11 pre-installed.

==== OnePlus Nord 2 5G ====
The Nord 2 5G succeeds the original Nord. The display is a 6.43-inch 1080p AMOLED at 90 Hz with an optical fingerprint scanner. It is powered by the MediaTek Dimensity 1200 with two storage configurations. The rear camera has a new 50 MP wide sensor with additional 8 MP ultrawide and 2 MP monochrome units; there is a single 32 MP sensor for the front camera. The battery has a capacity of 4500 mAh, and has faster Warp Charge 65. It is available in Gray Sierra, Blue Haze and Green Wood, and it ships with Android 11 and OxygenOS 11 pre-installed.

==== OnePlus Nord N20 5G ====
Announced on Apr 28, 2022, the N20 has a 6.4-inch AMOLED display with 2400 × 1080 pixels, 20:9 ratio, and 409 PPI running on the Qualcomm Snapdragon 695 5G SM6375 (6 nm).

==== OnePlus Nord CE 2 5G and Nord CE 2 Lite 5G ====
Released on February 22, 2022. The Nord CE 2 5G succeeds the original Nord CE. The display is a 6.43-inch 1080p AMOLED at 90 Hz with an optical fingerprint scanner. It is powered by the MediaTek Dimensity 900 with two ram configurations and one storage configuration. The rear camera has a 64 MP wide sensor with additional 8 MP ultrawide and 2 MP macro units; there is a single 16 MP sensor for the front camera. The battery has a capacity of 4500 mAh, and has faster 65 W SuperVOOC charging. It is available in Gray Mirror and Bahama Blue and it ships with Android 11 and OxygenOS 11 pre-installed.

The Lite model has announced on April 28, 2022, along with OnePlus 10R (Indian OnePlus Ace). It is almost identical to the realme V25 launched in March 2022 and realme Q5 launched in April 2022, but some different specifications. It doesn't have the CDMA connections, with a slightly smaller 6.59" screen and Bluetooth 5.2. It is available in 2 memory options: 6 and 8 GB RAM with 128 GB of storage. It is available in Black Dusk and Blue Tide and it ships with Android 12 and OxygenOS 12.1 pre-installed.

==== OnePlus Nord N300 5G ====
Released on November 3, 2022.

==== OnePlus Nord N30 5G ====
Released on June 8, 2023.

==== OnePlus Nord CE 3 Lite 5G ====
OnePlus introduced the Nord CE 3 Lite 5G as a budget-midrange offering released in July 2023.

==== OnePlus Nord 3 5G ====
The OnePlus Nord 3 5G is a midrange smartphone released in July 2023. The device has the Mediatek Dimensity 9000 (4 nm), a primary camera featuring the Sony IMX890 sensor, and a robust 5000 mAh battery complemented by 80 W ultra fast charging capabilities. Moreover, the Nord series reintroduces several design elements, including the Alert Slider and a dual-ring camera module, among others. It has a 6.74-inch 120 Hz Super Fluid AMOLED display and a screen-to-body ratio of 93.5%. The phone's sides are 8.15 mm. The OnePlus Nord 3 has a 50-megapixel Sony IMX890 main camera sensor with optical image stabilization. The phone's MediaTek Dimensity 9000 chipset supports 4K 60 frames per second video recording. The OnePlus Nord 3 runs on OxygenOS 13.1. The phone will receive three major Android software updates and four years of security updates.

==== OnePlus Nord CE 3 5G ====
OnePlus introduced the Nord CE 3 as a mid range smartphone released in August 2023. The dual-SIM (Nano) OnePlus Nord CE 3 5G runs on Android 13-based OxygenOS 13.1 and sports a 6.7-inch full-HD+ (1,080 x 2,412 pixels) Fluid AMOLED screen with a refresh rate of 120 Hz. The smartphone is powered by an octa-core Snapdragon 782G chipset from Qualcomm with an Adreno 642L GPU, paired with up to 12 GB of LPDDR4X RAM and up to 256 GB of inbuilt storage. OnePlus Nord CE 3 5G features a 50-megapixel primary camera with a 1/1.56-inch Sony IMX890 sensor with OIS and EIS support and an f/1.8 aperture. It also features an 8-megapixel Sony IMX355 ultra-wide-angle camera with a 112-degree field of view and an f/2.2 aperture. It also has a 2-megapixel 4 cm macro lens. The handset has a 16-megapixel selfie camera with an f/2.4 aperture with EIS, that can also be used for video chats. OnePlus has equipped the Nord CE 3 5G with a MicroSD card slot that supports up to 1 TB storage expansion. Connectivity options include 5G, 4G LTE, Wi-Fi, Bluetooth 5.2, NFC, GPS, A-GPS and a USB Type-C port. Sensors on board include an accelerometer, ambient light sensor, e-compass, gyroscope, proximity sensor, temperature sensor. The OnePlus Nord CE 3 5G has an IR blaster and features an in-display fingerprint scanner for biometric authentication. It packs a 5,000 mAh battery with support for 80 W SuperVOOC charging. It measures 162.7 mm × 75.5 mm × 8.2 mm and weighs 184g, according to the company.

==== OnePlus Nord CE 4 ====
Released in April 2024, the OnePlus Nord CE 4 features a large 6.7-inch FHD+ resolution display with support for 120 Hz refresh rate. The display also has the Aqua Touch technology which will help users interact with the phone's screen even when it has some water drops on top. The device is powered by a Qualcomm Snapdragon 7 Gen 3 processor coupled with up to 8 GB of RAM and 256 GB of internal storage. The internal storage can be expanded up to 1 TB with a microSD card. The OnePlus Nord CE4 houses a 5,500 mAh battery, which OnePlus claimed was the largest ever installed in a OnePlus phone, supporting 100 W SUPERVOOC charging for rapid charging. The device features a camera system comprising a 50-megapixel Sony LYT-600 sensor, accompanied by an 8-megapixel ultra-wide sensor, and a 16-megapixel selfie camera.

==== OnePlus Nord 4 ====
Released in August 2024, the OnePlus Nord 4 features a Qualcomm Snapdragon 7+ Gen 3 chipset, departing from the Mediatek Dimensity chipsets used in the Nord 2 5G and Nord 3. The Nord 4 features a 5500mAh battery with 100 W SuperVOOC charging. It has a 6.74-inch fluid AMOLED 120 Hz display with a screen-to-body ratio of ~90.0%. It features a premium metal unibody design.

==== OnePlus Nord 5 ====
Released on July 8, 2025, the OnePlus Nord 5 features a Qualcomm Snapdragon 8s Gen 3 chipset. The Nord 5 features a 6800mAh silicon carbide battery with 80 W SuperVOOC charging. It has a 6.83-inch fluid AMOLED 144 Hz display with a screen-to-body ratio of 93.6% and an instantaneous touch sampling rate of up to 3000 Hz. It features the same main camera as the OnePlus 15 ( 50 MP Sony IMX 906) and has an 8 MP Ultrawide camera. It also has a flagship grade 50 MP Samsung JN5 selfie camera. The phone has a plastic frame with glass back departing from the all metal unibody design from the Nord 4.

==== OnePlus Nord CE5 ====
Released on July 8, 2025, alongside the OnePlus Nord 5, the OnePlus Nord CE 5 features a MediaTek Dimensity 8350 Apex chipset. The Nord CE 5 features a 7100mAh silicon carbide battery with 80 W SuperVOOC charging. It has a 6.77-inch fluid AMOLED 120 Hz display with a screen-to-body ratio of 94.1% and an instantaneous touch sampling rate of up to 300 Hz. It features 50 MP Sony Sensor LYT-600, an 8 MP Ultrawide camera and a 16 MP selfie camera.

=== Concept One Smartphone ===
On January 7, 2020, OnePlus unveiled the Concept One smartphone at CES 2020. The OnePlus Concept One uses electrochromic glass to "hide" the rear-facing camera setup. The glass of the phone uses organic particles to create changes in transparency so that the glass covering the camera lenses can instantly shift from opaque black to transparent, presenting a clean, unbroken surface when not in use. OnePlus calls it a manifest of its 'burdenless' design philosophy. This solution is called 'Electronic CMF.' The rest of the design is inspired by the McLaren 720S supercar, with orange leather on the rear of the phone and a sliver of glass down the center of the rear panel of the device.

=== OnePlus Ace and 10R ===
The OnePlus Ace was unveiled on April 21, 2022, in China. This naming of the phone (OnePlus Ace) is similar to OPPO Reno Ace launched in October 2019 and Samsung Galaxy Ace series (2011 - 2014). This phone is a rebranded 150 W-model realme GT Neo3 launched 1 month ago, the overall design and specifications is similar to GT Neo3, but has the enhanced version of Dimensity 8100 unveiled in GT Neo3, Mediatek Dimensity 8100 Max. This also has the striped design on the back left side, and the camera array side surroundings is similar to Samsung Galaxy S22, but the camera array is squared like the GT Neo3, with the LED flash next to the main camera (LED flash under the main camera in GT Neo3). It also has 4500 mAh removable Lithium-polymer battery and 150 W fast charging just like in GT Neo3, a 50 MP Sony IMX766 main camera with OIS, 16 MP camera on the front, 120 Hz HDR10+ AMOLED display, with fast wireless charging and reverse wireless charging in addition. This phone also has ColorOS 12.1 with Android 12 and a punch-hole display just like in GT Neo3, and is the first OnePlus phone to use this display as the past OnePlus phones relied on corner cutouts. However, the length of the phone compared to GT Neo3 is a bit smaller (75.5 mm < 75.6 mm) and it is 2 grams lighter than GT Neo3 (186g < 188g), but it has no alert slider which has been a staple for the brand since its inception.

The Indian version of OnePlus Ace is OnePlus 10R, this phone was announced on April 28, 2022, and launched on May 4, 2022, in India, this phone is a successor to OnePlus 9R launched in 2021. Unlike the OnePlus Ace, this phone comes with 2 models: 80 W version and 150 W version. The models are similar just like the realme GT Neo3 80 W and 150 W versions, although the OnePlus 10R / Ace is (camera) designed different from realme GT Neo3. Similar to OnePlus Ace and realme GT Neo3, this phone shares the same specifications with OnePlus Ace, but with a Fluid AMOLED screen instead of OLED screen and no 512 GB storage option. However, this phone has some downgrades from OnePlus 9R. This phone has 8 MP ultrawide camera instead of 16 MP, and no 2 MP depth sensor, along with Dual-LED flash replaced with the LED flash. This phone also does not have Auto-HDR unlike the older phones have, and Always-On Display.

The OnePlus Ace also has the Racing Edition, released on May 31, 2022, in China.

== Headphones ==
=== OnePlus Bullets Wireless ===
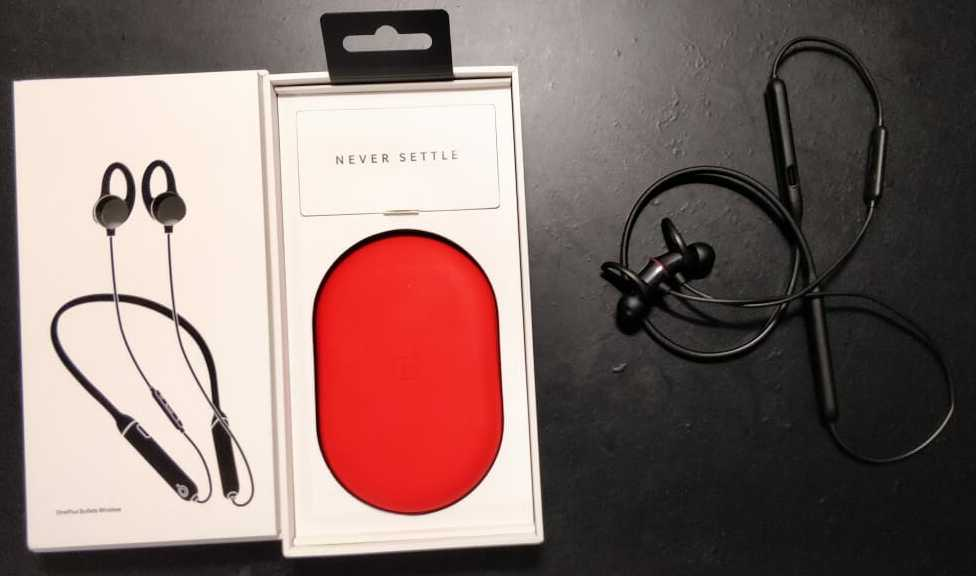
OnePlus Bullets Wireless

At the launch event of the OnePlus 6, the company announced the OnePlus Bullets Wireless earphones. The earphones have the company's Dash Charge technology with a USB-C port that allows five hours of playback for 10 minutes of charging. The earbuds feature a weather-resistant design and operate on Bluetooth connectivity. The Bullets Wireless earphones also support Google Assistant from a button click.

OnePlus released the Bullets Wireless 2 alongside the OnePlus 7 and 7 Pro on May 14. The primary improvements to this 2nd generation are the sound quality (using a bigger driver than from the previous generation's), better battery life and charging speed, as well as a new design which removed the need of earhooks, while still fitting comfortably in the ears and not falling on their own.

In May 2020, OnePlus introduced a less expensive version of OnePlus Bullets Wireless 2 in the form of OnePlus Bullets Wireless Z, in India. The major highlight of this product is 10 minutes of charging powers 10 hours of playback time. The overall playback time is 20 hours.

=== OnePlus Buds ===
The OnePlus Nord's announcement was accompanied by the release of OnePlus Buds earbuds. The Buds have an entirely plastic design with a case similar to AirPods. The case allows for ten hours of playback for 10 minutes of charging; the earbuds have seven hours with a total playback of thirty hours. The earbuds support Warp Charge and the charging case has a Type-C port. The Buds have IPX4 water resistance and support for Dolby Atmos. They are available in the US and Canada, as well as in Europe and India.

In October 2020, OnePlus introduced OnePlus Buds Z as a less expensive version of OnePlus Buds. The Buds Z retain Dolby Atmos support and have a different design with silicone ear tips and IP55 water resistance. They have a case that allows for three hours of playback for 10 minutes of charging; the earbuds have five hours with a total playback of twenty hours.

== Wearables ==
=== OnePlus Band ===
OnePlus has released a smart fitness tracker watch, dubbed the OnePlus Band, however it is only available in India. It comes in 3 colors, black, navy blue, and tangerine gray. The battery is advertised to last up to 2 weeks, and also is IP68 rated. The OnePlus Band is priced at ₹2,799 (Indian Rupee/INR).

=== OnePlus Watch ===
OnePlus announced the OnePlus Watch on 23 March 2021. The smartwatch, released on 14 April, comes in two colors, silver and black, with an advertised battery life of up to two weeks for a single charge or a week if used heavily. The OnePlus Watch has Wi-Fi, Bluetooth, 1 GB of RAM, 4 GB of storage, speakers, and GPS. The smartwatch uses a different operating system instead of Wear OS and is priced at $159, €159, or ₹16,999.

== TVs ==
=== OnePlus TV ===
In September 2018, the company confirmed it plans to venture into the smart TVs market with the OnePlus TV. The new division will be headed by the company CEO Pete Lau. OnePlus has later specified that the OnePlus TV will run a version of Google's Android TV operating system and that it will cost less than competing televisions.

=== OnePlus TV Q1 and Q1 Pro ===
OnePlus TV Q1 features 55-inch 4K-resolution QLED panels. The OnePlus TV Q1 has a rated sound output of 50 W. The televisions also support Dolby Vision and sound formats up to Dolby Atmos, along with support for the HDR10 format. The OnePlus TV range has the Gamma Magic Colour picture processor, which aims to enhance picture quality. The OnePlus TV Q1 models have a unique Kevlar-like finish at the back and comes with a unique stand design. The OnePlus TV Q1 runs on Android TV 9.0 that comes with some customization including OxygenPlay, a curated content service built into the TV. OnePlus has also released the OnePlus Connect app that can be used with the OnePlus TV.

Similar to the Q1, the OnePlus TV Q1 Pro has a 55-inch 4K-resolution QLED screen. The TV panel has slim borders all around, and a small, discreet OnePlus logo in the middle of the bottom bezel. There are four HDMI ports, two USB ports, an Ethernet port, a Toslink port, and a single AV-in socket that can be used with an included adapter for connectivity with older non-HDMI devices. OnePlus TV Q1 Pro has a motorized 50 W soundbar with eight front-firing speaker drivers. Beyond its physical appearance, the OnePlus TV runs on Android TV with access to OxygenPlay, a content curation service by OnePlus, and easier smartphone integration through the OnePlus Connect app.

=== OnePlus TV Y series ===
OnePlus TV Y series is an affordable series of televisions, available in 32-inch and 43-inch size variants. They include access to smart features such as OnePlus Connect, and Google services such as Google Assistant, Google Chromecast, and the Google Play store, offering users an enhanced smart TV experience at cheaper prices. The system runs on Android TV 9 Pie further enhancing the user experience. Users can use the Oxygen Play interface for a content-centric view. The Y series has a rated sound output of 20 W with Dolby Audio tuning.

=== OnePlus TV Unus series ===
OnePlus TV U series is an affordable alternative to the OnePlus TV Q1 Series, and comes in a single variant of 55 inches, with a 4K LED screen and support for up to the Dolby Vision HDR format. The lineup also has a 93 percent colour gamut on DCI-P3, offering a standard cinematic experience. The OnePlus TV is slim with a thickness of 6.9 mm with a screen-to-body ratio of 95 percent offering a minimalistic design. The TV has access to platforms such as Oxygen Play and the OnePlus Connect app for enhancing user experience. Similar to the Y Series, it runs on Android TV 9 Pie with access to Google Assistant, Google Chromecast, and the Google Play Store.The U series has a 30 W four-speaker setup, support for Dolby Atmos audio, and the ability to use the television as a wireless speaker in Bluetooth stereo mode. Compared to its competitors, OnePlus TV U series is on the pricier side, while providing a similar experience.

== See also ==
- OnePlus
- List of mobile phone makers by country
