= PenTile matrix family =

Electronic device display

PenTile matrix is a family of patented subpixel matrix schemes used in electronic device displays. PenTile is a trademark of Samsung. PenTile matrices are used in AMOLED and LCD displays.

These subpixel layouts are specifically designed to operate with proprietary algorithms for subpixel rendering embedded in the display driver, allowing plug and play compatibility with conventional RGB (Red-Green-Blue) stripe panels.

== Overview ==
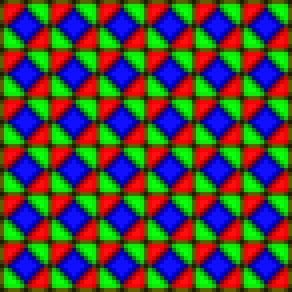
Prototypic five subpixel repeat cell geometry of PenTile Matrix (magnified diagram)

"PenTile Matrix" (a neologism from penta-, meaning "five" in Greek and tile) describes the geometric layout of the prototypical subpixel arrangement developed in the early 1990s. The layout consists of a quincunx comprising two red subpixels, two green subpixels, and one central blue subpixel in each unit cell. It was inspired by biomimicry of the human retina, which has nearly equal numbers of L and M type cone cells, but significantly fewer S cones. As the S cones are primarily responsible for perceiving blue colors, which do not appreciably affect the perception of luminance, reducing the number of blue subpixels with respect to the red and green subpixels in a display does not reduce the image quality. However, the layout may cause color leakage image distortion, which can be reduced by filters. In some cases the layout causes reduced moiré and blockiness compared to conventional RGB layouts. The PenTile layout is specifically designed to work with and be dependent upon subpixel rendering that uses only one and a quarter subpixel per pixel, on average, to render an image. That is, that any given input pixel is mapped to either a red-centered logical pixel, or a green-centered logical pixel.

=== History ===
PenTile was invented by Candice H. Brown Elliott, for which she was awarded the Society for Information Display's Otto Schade Prize in 2014. The technology was licensed by the company Clairvoyante from 2000 until 2008, during which time several prototype PenTile displays were developed by a number of Asian liquid crystal display (LCD) manufacturers. In March 2008, Samsung Electronics acquired Clairvoyante's PenTile IP assets. Samsung then funded a new company, Nouvoyance, Inc. to continue development of the PenTile technology.

== PenTile RGBG ==
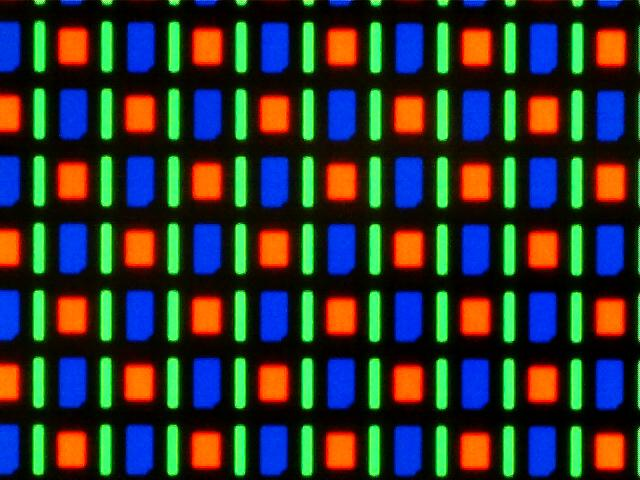
Magnified image of the AMOLED screen on the Google Nexus One smartphone using the RGBG system of the PenTile matrix family

PenTile RGBG layout used in AMOLED and plasma displays uses green pixels interleaved with alternating red and blue pixels. The human eye is most sensitive to green, especially for high resolution luminance information. The green subpixels are mapped to input pixels on a one-to-one basis. The red and blue subpixels are subsampled, reconstructing the chroma signal at a lower resolution. The luminance signal is processed using adaptive subpixel rendering filters to optimize reconstruction of high spatial frequencies from the input image, wherein the green subpixels provide the majority of the reconstruction. The red and blue subpixels are capable of reconstructing the horizontal and vertical spatial frequencies, but not the highest of the diagonal. Diagonal high spatial frequency information in the red and blue channels of the input image are transferred to the green subpixels for image reconstruction. Thus the RG-BG scheme creates a color display with one third fewer subpixels than a traditional RGB-RGB scheme but with the same measured luminance display resolution. This is similar to the Bayer filter commonly used in digital cameras.

=== Devices ===
As of 2021, "almost all" OLED screens in portable consumer devices use some form of Pentile subpixel layout.

- Apple iPhone X
- Apple iPhone XS/XS Max
- Apple iPhone 11 Pro/11 Pro Max
- Apple iPhone 12/12 Mini
- Apple iPhone 12 Pro/12 Pro Max
- Apple iPhone 13/13 Mini
- Apple iPhone 13 Pro/13 Pro Max
- Apple iPhone 14/14 Plus
- Apple iPhone 14 Pro/14 Pro Max
- BlackBerry Q10
- Dell Venue Pro
- Galaxy Nexus
- HTC One S
- HTC Desire (AMOLED variants only)
- HTC Vive
- Huawei Ascend P1
- Huawei Mate 20 Pro
- Huawei P30
- Huawei P30 Pro
- Microsoft Lumia 650
- Motorola RAZR i
- Motorola Droid 3
- Moto X (2nd generation)
- Nexus One
- Nexus S (Super AMOLED variants only)
- Nexus 6
- Nexus 6P
- Nokia N9
- Nokia Lumia 730/Nokia Lumia 735
- Nokia Lumia 800
- Nokia Lumia 925
- Nokia Lumia 928
- Nokia Lumia 1020
- Oculus Rift
- Oculus Quest
- OnePlus 3
- OnePlus 3T
- OnePlus 5
- OnePlus 5T
- OnePlus 6
- OnePlus 6T
- Pantech Burst
- Playstation VR
- Playstation VR 2
- Pixel
- Pixel XL
- Pixel 2
- Pixel 2 XL
- Pixel 3
- Pixel 3 XL
- Samsung Galaxy S
- Samsung Galaxy S Plus
- Samsung Galaxy S III
- Samsung Galaxy S III Mini
- Samsung Galaxy S4
- Samsung Galaxy S5
- Samsung Galaxy S6
- Samsung Galaxy S6 Active
- Samsung Galaxy S6 Edge
- Samsung Galaxy S6 Edge+
- Samsung Galaxy S7
- Samsung Galaxy S7 Edge
- Samsung Galaxy S8
- Samsung Galaxy S8+
- Samsung Galaxy S8 Active
- Samsung Galaxy S9
- Samsung Galaxy S9+
- Samsung Galaxy S10e/S10/S10+/S10 5G
- Samsung Galaxy S20/S20+/S20 Ultra
- Samsung Galaxy S21/S21+/S21 Ultra
- Samsung Galaxy Note
- Samsung Galaxy Note 3
- Samsung Galaxy Note 4
- Samsung Galaxy Note 5
- Samsung Galaxy Note 7
- Samsung Galaxy Note 8
- Samsung Galaxy Note 9
- Samsung Galaxy Tab S 8.4
- Samsung Wave S8500
- Samsung Ativ S
- Samsung NX10
- Sony Xperia XZ3
- Xiaomi Mi A3

== PenTile RGBW ==
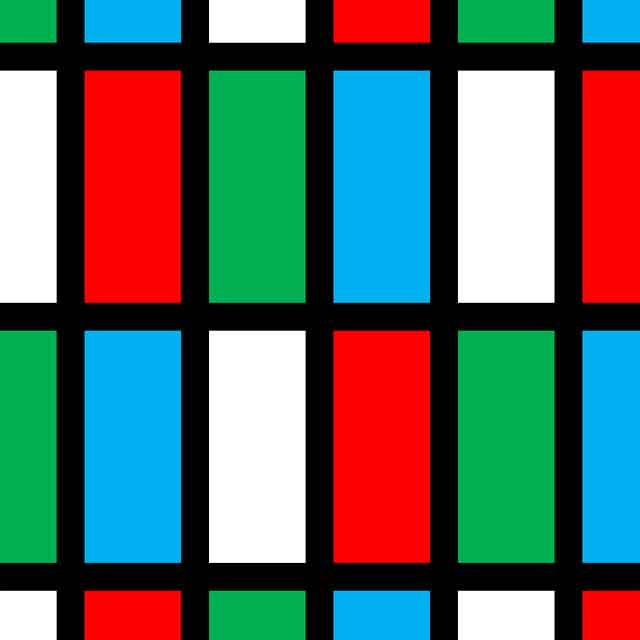
Magnified image of the RGBW unit

PenTile RGBW technology, used in LCD, adds an extra subpixel to the traditional red, green and blue subpixels that is a clear area without color filtering material and with the only purpose of letting backlight come through, hence W for white. This makes it possible to produce a brighter image compared to an RGB-matrix while using the same amount of power, or produce an equally bright image while using less power.

The PenTile RGBW layout uses each red, green, blue and white subpixel to present high-resolution luminance information to the human eyes' red-sensing and green-sensing cone cells, while using the combined effect of all the color subpixels to present lower-resolution chroma (color) information to all three cone cell types. Combined, this optimizes the match of display technology to the biological mechanisms of human vision. The layout uses one third fewer subpixels for the same resolution as the RGB stripe (RGB-RGB) layout, in spite of having four color primaries instead of the conventional three, using subpixel rendering combined with metamer rendering. Metamer rendering optimizes the energy distribution between the white subpixel and the combined red, green, and blue subpixels: W <> RGB, to improve image sharpness.

The display driver chip has an RGB to RGBW color vector space converter and gamut mapping algorithm, followed by metamer and subpixel rendering algorithms. In order to maintain saturated color quality, to avoid simultaneous contrast error between saturated colors and peak white brightness, while simultaneously reducing backlight power requirements, the display backlight brightness is under control of the PenTile driver engine. When the image is mostly desaturated colors, those near white or grey, the backlight brightness is significantly reduced, often to less than 50% peak, while the LCD levels are increased to compensate. When the image has very bright saturated colors, the backlight brightness is maintained at higher levels. The PenTile RGBW also has an optional high-brightness mode that doubles the brightness of the desaturated color image areas, such as black-and-white text, for improved outdoor viewability.

=== Devices ===
- Motorola MC65
- Motorola ES55
- Motorola ES400
- Motorola Atrix 4G
- Samsung Galaxy Note 10.1 2014 version
- Lenovo Yoga 2 Pro
- Lenovo Yoga 3 Pro
- HP ENVY TouchSmart 14-k022tx Sleekbook
- MSI GS60 Ghost Pro 4K
- Lenovo IdeaPad Y50 4K
- Asus ZenBook UX303LN 4K
- Asus ZenBook Pro UX501JW
- LG UH7500/6500/6100
- LG ThinQ G7/G7+
- Oculus Quest 1

== Controversy ==
An ongoing controversy regarding the definition or measurement of resolution of color subpixelated flat panel displays led many people to question the resolution claims of PenTile display products. Journalists have noted that in "just about every flat-panel TV in existence, each pixel is composed of one red, one green, and one blue subpixel (RGB), all of uniform size". In traditional flat-panel screens, the resolution is defined by the number of red, green, and blue subpixels, in groups of three, in an array in each axis. As a result, each pixel or group of subpixels can render any colour on the screen, regardless of neighbouring pixels. This is not the case with PenTile screens.

The Video Electronics Standards Association (VESA) method of measuring and defining resolution in color displays is to measure the contrast of line pairs, requiring a minimum of 50% Michelson contrast for displays intended for rendering text. The developers of PenTile displays use this VESA criterion for contrast of line pairs to calculate the resolutions specified. In the RGBG layout the alternate red and blue subpixels are 'shared' or sub-sampled with neighboring pixels. Due to the one third lower subpixel density on PenTile displays the pixel structure may be more visible when compared to RGB stripe displays with the same pixel density. The loss of subpixels for a given resolution specification has led some journalists to describe the use of PenTile as "shady practice" and "sort of cheating".

For a given size and resolution specification, the PenTile screen can appear grainy, pixelated, speckled, with blurred text on some saturated colors and backgrounds when compared to RGB stripe color. This effect is understood to be caused by the restriction of the number of subpixels that may participate in the image reconstruction when colors are highly saturated to primaries. In the RGBW case, this is caused as the W subpixel will not be available in order to maintain the saturated color. In the RGBG case, this effect will occur when the color boundary is primarily red or blue, as the fully populated (one green per pixel) sub-pixel cannot contribute. For all other cases, text and especially full color images are effectively reconstructed.

== Advantages and disadvantages ==
The PenTile layout reduces the number of subpixels needed to create a specified resolution. Consequently it is possible to achieve an HD resolution on a PenTile AMOLED screen at lower cost than other technologies, and most reviewers note that "300 ppi" (as per VESA - not full pixels) resolution displays (such as Samsung Galaxy S III) make the PenTile effect less obvious than lower resolution PenTile displays (Droid Razr). The second advantage is lower power consumption: the HTC One S's use of a PenTile display makes it more energy efficient and thinner than equivalent LCD screens, giving it better battery life than the HTC One X's IPS LCD. A PenTile AMOLED screen is also cheaper than an RGB stripe AMOLED.

According to Samsung, PenTile AMOLED displays have a longer life span due to having fewer blue subpixels.

Most PenTile displays use rectangular grids of alternating green and blue/red pixels. However the Samsung Galaxy S4 uses a PenTile Diamond Pixel array, where the green pixels are oval and repeat in a single line, while red and blue pixels are larger and alternate between the lines of green, ensuring more uniform colours with fewer aberrations compared to the earlier generation PenTile display on the Galaxy S III.

== Reception ==
PenTile displays for smartphones have received a mixed reception. For instance the Motorola Atrix 4G's display had "inaccurate colours and poor viewing angles, not to mention practically unreadable text at its furthest zoom". Also in a comparison between the original Droid Razr and the cheaper RAZR V, the RAZR V's TN TFT LCD (a low-end LCD, compared to the higher-end IPS panel LCD) was found to be much crisper than the Droid Razr's Super AMOLED Advanced PenTile despite both screens using the same 'resolution'.

== See also ==
- Quattron – RGB reproduction via RGBY
- RGBE filter – RGB with an additional emerald subpixel
- Bayer filter - RGGB filters used in image sensors
