= OnePlus 5T =

Android-based smartphone by OnePlus

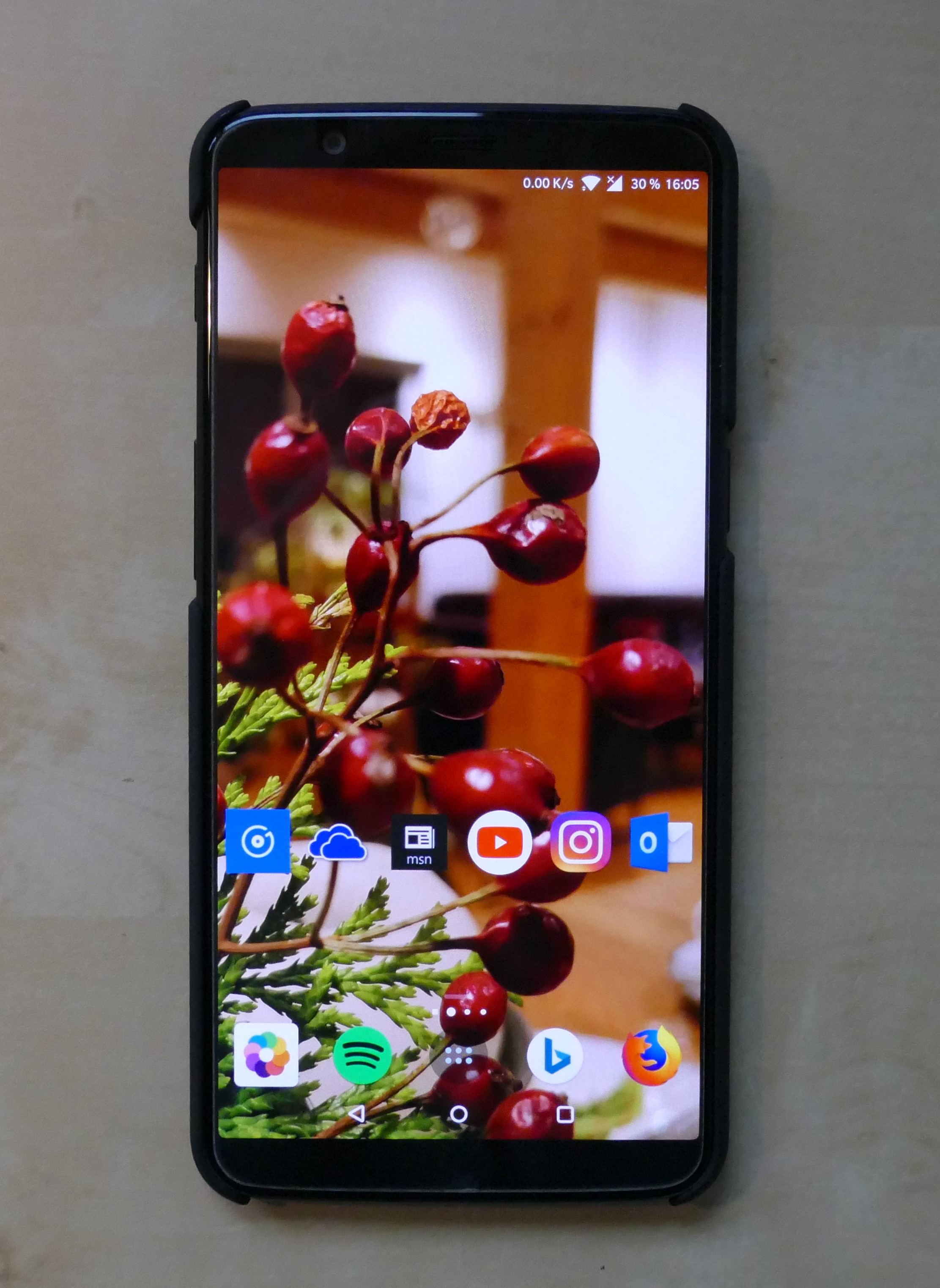
- Front of the OnePlus 5T
- Brand: OnePlus
- Manufacturer: OnePlus
- Type: Phablet
- First released: 21 November 2017; 8 years ago
- Availability by region: 21 November 2017: Canada; Denmark; Finland; France; Germany; Italy; Netherlands; Republic of Ireland; United Kingdom; United States; 28 November 2017: India; 1 December 2017: China
- Predecessor: OnePlus 5
- Successor: OnePlus 6
- Compatible networks: 2G, 3G, and 4G
- Form factor: Slate
- Dimensions: 156.1 mm (6.15 in) H 75 mm (3.0 in) W 7.3 mm (0.29 in) D
- Weight: 162 g (5.7 oz)
- Operating system: OxygenOS (Based on Android)
- System-on-chip: Qualcomm Snapdragon 835
- CPU: Octa-core (4×2.45 GHz + 4×1.9 GHz) Kryo
- GPU: Adreno 540
- Memory: 6 or 8 GB LPDDR4X RAM
- Storage: 64 or 128 GB UFS 2.1
- Removable storage: Not available
- Battery: 3,300 mAh Li-Ion not user-replaceable with Dash Charge technology
- Rear camera: 16 MP Sony Exmor IMX398 (f/1.7, EIS) + 20 MP Sony Exmor IMX376K (f/1.7), phase detection autofocus, dual-LED flash, Video 4K at 30fps, 1080p at 30 or 60fps, 720p at 30 or 120fps
- Front camera: 16 MP Sony Exmor IMX371 (f/2.0, EIS, HDR)
- Display: 6.01 in (153 mm) 1080p (2160 ×1080 pixels) Full-HD+ Optic AMOLED / DCI-P3 (401 ppi) with 2:1 aspect ratio
- Connectivity: 3G, 4G VoLTE, Bluetooth 5.0, NFC, WiFi 802.11a/b/g/n/ac, USB-C
- Data inputs: Sensors: Accelerometer; Fingerprint scanner (Rear-mounted); Geomagnetic sensor; Gyroscope; Hall sensor; Proximity sensor; GNSS (GPS/GLONASS/BeiDou/Galileo); Other: Physical sound volume keys; 3.5 mm headphone jack; Alert Slider
- Model: A5010
- Codename: dumpling
- Website: oneplus.net/5t

The OnePlus 5T is an Android-based smartphone produced, released and marketed by OnePlus. It was unveiled on 16 November 2017 via a live streamed press event which aired on YouTube. It went on sale on 21 November 2017. It is an incremental update to its predecessor, the OnePlus 5, which was unveiled only five months prior. Some notable changes that are featured, includes, a larger display and thinner bezels found on the device with the repositioning of the fingerprint scanner from the front to the rear panel. On 17 May 2018 the OnePlus 5T was succeeded by the OnePlus 6.

== Specifications ==
=== Hardware ===
The OnePlus 5T features a redesigned 6.01" Full Optic 2160x1080 AMOLED display, which the company calls the "Sunlight display" and claims to provide a crisp and bright experience even when used in a sunny environment, such as when outdoors. The display uses the 18:9 (2:1) aspect ratio instead of the 16:9 aspect ratio found in most smartphones, and supports the DCI-P3 wide color gamut standard. It also has a pixel density of 401ppi, and features smaller bezels than found in previous OnePlus smartphones such as the OnePlus 5 and 3T. The 5T's body is made entirely from anodized aluminum, uses 2.5D Gorilla Glass 5 as protection for the display, and uses a ceramic coating for the fingerprint sensor which was moved to the rear of the phone. It also features an "Alert Slider" located on the left side of the device, a feature that is also available on its predecessors, the 5, the 3T, and the 3, which allows users to set their notifications to silent. The 5T is powered by the Qualcomm Snapdragon 835 and comes with the choice of either 6 or 8 GB of LPDDR4X RAM, depending on the storage configuration. Similar to its predecessor, the phone is available in either a 64 GB or 128 GB configuration.

Unlike OnePlus devices released in the past, the phone does not feature any physical hardware buttons on the front of the device, electing to use virtual navigation keys instead. It features a non-removable 3,300 mAh battery, capable of fast charging by OnePlus' proprietary Dash Charge through its USB-C port. The phone retains the 3.5mm headphone jack, but lacks stereo speakers, instead opting for a mono speaker located on the bottom of the device. The device features a combination of a 16 MP main lens (Sony Exmor IMX398) and a 20 MP secondary lens (Sony Exmor IMX376K) located on the device's rear, both of which have an aperture of f/1.7. They are capable of shooting 4K video and "Portrait mode" shots, like many other flagship devices. The front (selfie) camera is also a 16 MP sensor, with an aperture of f/2.0. The 5T features a "Face Unlock" facial recognition feature that can be used to unlock the device, however it lacks the ability to authenticate purchases. Since it uses 2D scanning, it is relatively faster than some other competitors, but doesn't work in particular lighting conditions and is not as secure.

The OnePlus 5T has become available in multiple limited edition variants over time, such as a Star Wars edition promoting Star Wars: The Last Jedi, which came with a special case and a new color scheme; a "Sandstone White" variant which was released on 5 January 2018 and featured a white color scheme and a red "Alert Slider", which sold out in under 2 hours; and a "Lava Red" variant which was released on 11 January 2018 initially in India, and became available in Europe and North America on 6 February.

=== Software ===
The OnePlus 5T ships with Android 7.1.1 "Nougat" and uses the OxygenOS user interface, OnePlus' proprietary custom skin built on top of Android, adding various features not found in the stock Android operating system, such as night mode and reading mode, which both change the color temperature of the device's screen, and the ability to change the Bluetooth audio codec. The night mode reduces the screen's color temperature to reduce blue light levels, while the reading mode applies a monochrome-like effect to the screen. Unlike the OnePlus 5, the 5T no longer overrides the performance scaling in benchmarks to max out CPU and GPU clocks in specific applications, this makes benchmarks being run on the 5T more accurate.

OnePlus promised an update to Android 8 "Oreo" (OxygenOS 5.0) in early 2018. The first beta for this version was released on 29 December 2017, but was pulled a couple days later due to issues with regards to instability that were present. OnePlus fixed the issues and reuploaded the beta version on 3 January 2018.

The first stable Android Oreo-based version of OxygenOS (OxygenOS 5.0.2) for the OnePlus 5T was released on 31 January 2018, introducing features such as Picture-in-Picture, Autofill, and Notification Dots, as well as a faster boot time. The update also introduced a redesigned Quick Settings menu, introduces a security patch for CVE-2017-13218, and updates a few system applications. The update does not contain the Treble feature for device independent system updates. On 11 March 2018, OnePlus released the Android 8.1 "Oreo" update in beta for the OnePlus 5 and the OnePlus 5T, bringing the changes made to Android 8.1 such as the Neural Networks and Shared memory APIs, the dimming of the navigation bar when it is not being used to the devices, and other improvements, such as improvements to the Autofill framework. The update also updated the security patch level to 1 February 2018. In Q2 2020 The OnePlus 5 and 5T got their stable Android 10 updates with OxygenOS.

=== Network compatibility ===
The OnePlus 5T includes only a single variant for cellular networks worldwide.

Model	GSM Bands	CDMA Bands	UMTS Bands	TD-SCDMA Bands	LTE Bands
A5010	Quad Band	BC0	1, 2, 4, 5, 8	34, 39	FDD: 1, 2, 3, 4, 5, 7, 8, 12, 17, 18, 19, 20, 25, 26, 28, 29, 30, 66 TDD: 34, 38, 39, 40, 41

== Reception ==
=== Critical reception ===
OnePlus 5T received generally positive reviews. The Verge praised the phone's design and optimized software but noted that the camera was still mediocre. Engadget lauded the phone for its excellent performance despite its price bracket.

== See also ==
- Comparison of ARMv8-A cores, ARMv8 family
- List of Qualcomm Snapdragon systems on chips

Preceded by OnePlus 5	OnePlus 5T; 2017	Succeeded by OnePlus 6
