= OnePlus 6 =

Android smartphone

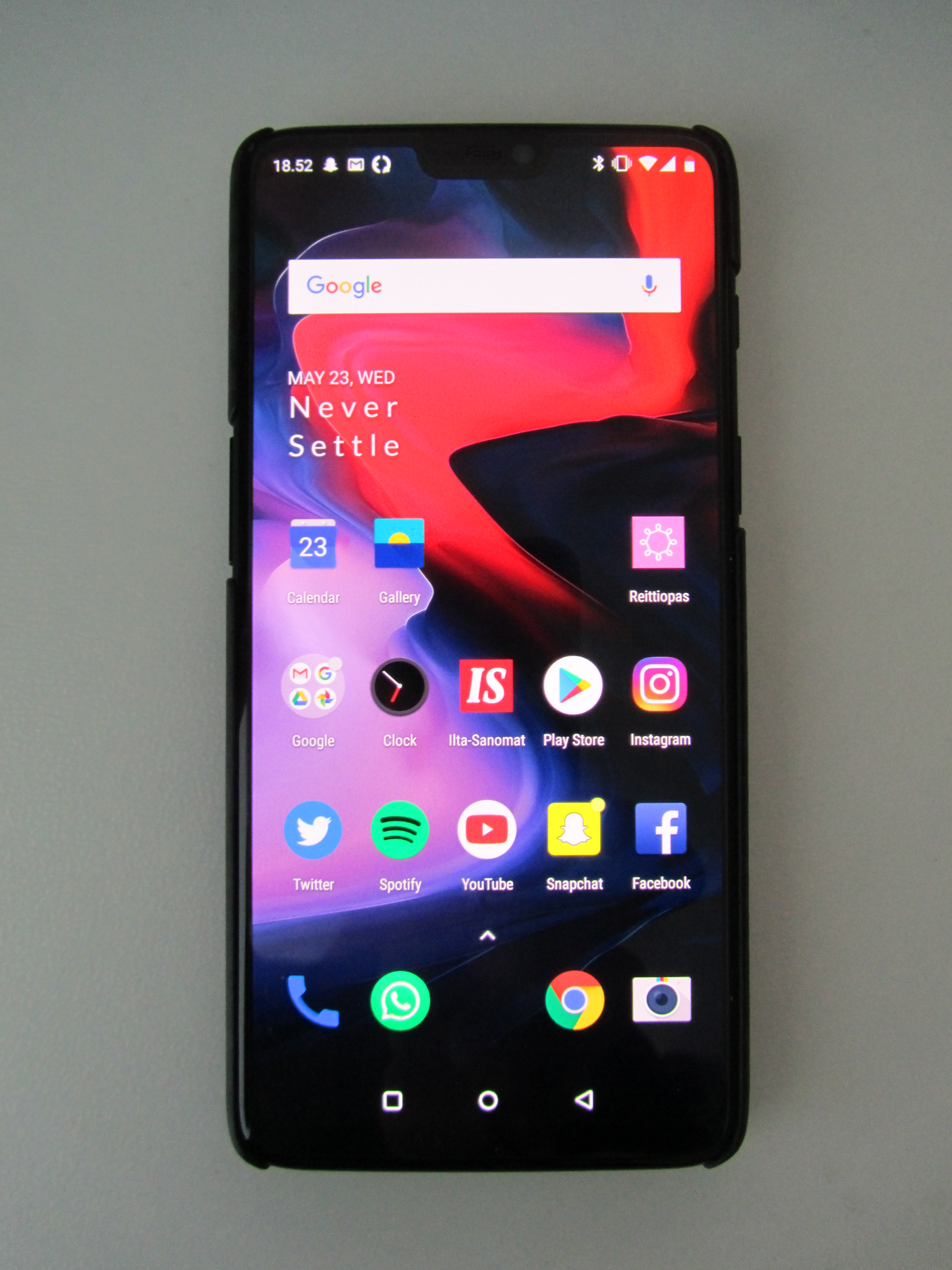
- Brand: OnePlus
- Manufacturer: OnePlus
- Type: Phablet
- First released: May 2, 2018; 8 years ago
- Predecessor: OnePlus 5T
- Successor: OnePlus 6T
- Compatible networks: 2G, 3G, 4G
- Form factor: Slate
- Dimensions: 155.7 mm (6.13 in) H 75.4 mm (2.97 in) W 7.75 mm (0.305 in) D
- Weight: 177 g (6.2 oz)
- Operating system: OxygenOS (based on Android Oreo, upgradable to Android 11 via OnePlus or Android 15 via LineageOS)
- System-on-chip: Qualcomm Snapdragon 845
- CPU: Octa-core (4×2.8 GHz + 4×1.8 GHz) Kryo
- GPU: Adreno 630
- Memory: 6 or 8 GB LPDDR4X RAM
- Storage: 64, 128, or 256 GB UFS 2.1
- Battery: 3,300 mAh Li-Ion with Dash Charge technology
- Rear camera: 16 MP Sony Exmor IMX519 (f/1.7, OIS + EIS) + 20 MP Sony Exmor IMX376K (f/1.7), phase detection autofocus, dual-LED flash, Video 4K at 30 or 60fps, 1080p at 30, 60 or 240 fps, 720p at 30 or 480 fps
- Front camera: 16 MP Sony Exmor IMX371 (f/2.0, EIS, HDR), Video 1080p at 30 fps, 720p at 30 fps
- Display: 6.28 in (160 mm) 1080p (2280 ×1080 pixels) Full-HD+ Optic AMOLED / DCI-P3 (402 ppi) with 19:9 aspect ratio
- Connectivity: 3G, 4G VoLTE, Bluetooth 5.0 with aptX, NFC, 2x2 MIMO WiFi 802.11a/b/g/n/ac, USB-C
- Data inputs: Fingerprint scanner (rear-mounted), Accelerometer, gyroscope, proximity sensor, electronic compass; GNSS (GPS/GLONASS/BeiDou/Galileo)
- Model: A6000, A6003
- Codename: enchilada
- Website: oneplus.com/6

The OnePlus 6 is an Android-based smartphone made by OnePlus. It was unveiled on 2 May 2018 and went on sale on 21-22 May 2018.

== History ==
In March 2018, it was announced that the phone would have a "notch", but that there would be an option to hide it. On 2 April 2018, it was confirmed that the premium edition of the OnePlus 6 would feature the Snapdragon 845 processor, 8 GB of RAM and 256 GB of internal storage.

OnePlus opened forums for the OnePlus 6 in April 2018.

One week after the OnePlus 6 went on sale, OnePlus acknowledged a software bug that caused the device to drop all audio when a phone call was switched to speakerphone. This was later resolved in a 5.1.6 software update.

In November 2021, OnePlus stopped supplying software updates to the operating system.

== Specifications ==
=== Hardware ===
- With an all-glass build different from its predecessors, the phone contains 6 or 8 GB of RAM, the Snapdragon 845 and a choice of 64, 128 or 256 GB of UFS 2.1 storage. It features a slightly larger (when compared to the OnePlus 5T) AMOLED 2280 x 1080 display with a cutout at the top for the front camera, sensors, earpiece, and notification LED. The OnePlus 6 uses 2.5D Corning Gorilla Glass 5 as a cover glass and supports Bluetooth 5.0 and NFC.
- The OnePlus 6 has two rear facing cameras. The primary one uses the Sony IMX 519 sensor with OIS while the secondary camera uses the Sony IMX 376K sensor for a bokeh effect in portrait mode.
- The phone has been specified to be dust, splash, and water resistant; however, it has not been certified with an IP Code and OnePlus suggests against submerging the device. Water damage is not covered by the warranty.
- The phone has an Alert slider on the right side with 3 notification profiles: Silent, Vibrate and Ring.
- The phone has four colour variants: Mirror Black, Midnight Black, Silk White, and Amber Red.

=== Software ===
The OnePlus 6 launched with Android 8.1 installed and uses the OxygenOS interface. The option to take part in the Android Pie beta was available from launch. The first stable version of OxygenOS 9.0 based on Android Pie was released on September 21, 2018. Currently the OnePlus 6 is on Android 11 but can be upgraded to Android 15 via LineageOS.

OnePlus 6 (and 6T alike) has also attracted interests from the Linux communities and FOSS enthusiasts, which worked to port Linux distributions and develop mobile application (including multiple Desktop Environments) to the Phone, including Ubuntu Touch, postmarketOS, Mobian, and Sailfish OS.

=== Network compatibility ===
The OnePlus 6 includes 2 variants for cellular networks worldwide.

Model	GSM Bands	CDMA Bands	UMTS Bands	TD-SCDMA Bands	LTE Bands
A6000 (India, Asia, China)	Quad Band	BC0, BC1	1, 2, 4, 5, 8, 9, 19	34, 39	FDD: 1, 2, 3, 4, 5, 7, 8, 12, 17, 18, 19, 20, 25, 26, 28, 29, 66 TDD: 34, 38, 39, 40, 41
A6003 (Europe, North America)	Quad Band	BC0, BC1	1, 2, 4, 5, 8, 9, 19	34, 39	FDD: 1, 2, 3, 4, 5, 7, 8, 12, 17, 18, 19, 20, 25, 26, 28, 29, 30, 32, 66, 71 TDD: 34, 38, 39, 40, 41

Preceded by OnePlus 5T	OnePlus 6; 2018	Succeeded by OnePlus 6T
