= OnePlus 5 =

Smartphone by OnePlus

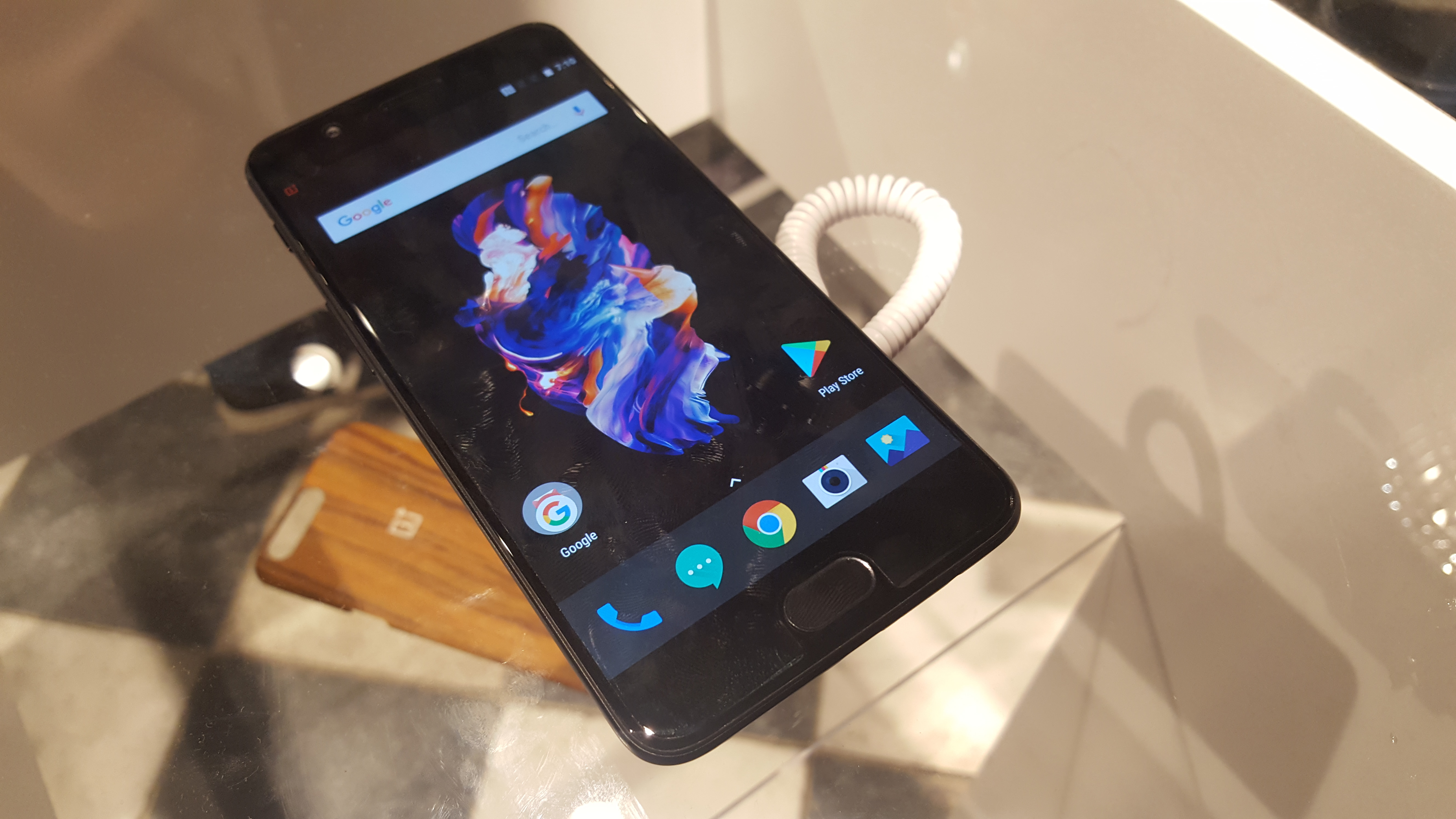
- Brand: OnePlus
- Manufacturer: OnePlus
- Type: Smartphone
- First released: June 20, 2017; 9 years ago
- Availability by region: June 20, 2017: United States; Canada; United Kingdom; Germany; France; June 21, 2017: Netherlands; Finland; Denmark; June 22, 2017: India; China; June 27, 2017: International
- Predecessor: OnePlus 3T
- Successor: OnePlus 5T
- Compatible networks: 2G, 3G, and 4G
- Form factor: Slate
- Dimensions: 154.2 mm (6.07 in) H 74.1 mm (2.92 in) W 7.25 mm (0.285 in) D
- Weight: 153 g (5.4 oz)
- Operating system: Android Version: 9.0 (10.0 confirmed)
- System-on-chip: Qualcomm Snapdragon 835
- CPU: Octa-core (4×2.45 GHz + 4×1.9 GHz) Kryo
- GPU: Adreno 540
- Memory: 6 or 8 GB LPDDR4X RAM
- Storage: 64 or 128 GB UFS 2.1
- Battery: 3,300 mAh Li-Ion with Dash Charge technology
- Rear camera: 16 MP Sony Exmor IMX398 (f/1.7, EIS) + 20 MP Sony Exmor IMX350 Telephoto (f/2.6)
- Front camera: 16 MP Sony Exmor IMX371 (f/2.0, EIS, HDR)
- Display: 5.5" 1080p Optic AMOLED / DCI-P3 (401 ppi) with 2.5D Corning Gorilla Glass 5
- Sound: Bottom-facing speaker; 3-microphone with noise cancellation; Support AANC; Dirac HD Sound; Dirac Power Sound
- Connectivity: 3G, 4G VoLTE, Bluetooth 5.0, NFC, WiFi 802.11a/b/g/n/ac, USB-C
- Data inputs: Fingerprint scanner (front-mounted, Ceramic), Accelerometer, gyroscope, proximity sensor, electronic compass; GNSS (GPS/GLONASS/BeiDou/Galileo)
- Model: A5000
- Codename: cheeseburger
- Other: 3.5mm headphone jack Alert Slider
- Website: oneplus.net/5

The OnePlus 5 (also abbreviated as OP5) is a smartphone made by OnePlus. It is the successor to the OnePlus 3T, which was released in 2016. The OnePlus 5 was officially unveiled during a keynote on 20 June 2017 and first released on June 20, 2017. It was succeeded by the OnePlus 5T five months later on November 21, 2017.

== History ==
The Verge announced in May 2017 that the successor to the OnePlus 3 would be known as the OnePlus 5. While OnePlus did not officially state why the number four was skipped, it was speculated that it was due to the number four being considered unlucky (tetraphobia) in China. According to India Today, the "4" was skipped because the OnePlus 2 was not very successful and now OnePlus considers even numbers unlucky.

OnePlus confirmed that the handset would feature a Snapdragon 835 processor prior to launch. OnePlus also noted its work with the image processing firm DxO to improve the camera on the device.

== Specifications ==
=== Hardware ===
The OnePlus 5 has an anodized metal back, like its predecessors, the OnePlus 3 and 3T. The handset is currently available in Slate Gray (black/gray) and Soft Gold (white/gold) colours. The limited edition Soft Gold colour was released on 7 August 2017. A Midnight Black (black/matte black) colour was also manufactured, but later removed from their website. Another special edition, called JCC+, made in association with Castelbajac is exclusively available in Europe. It features a Slate Gray back with handwriting along with colourful hardware buttons.

The device comes with a Qualcomm Snapdragon 835 chipset clocked at 2.45 GHz, with up to 8 GB RAM and 128 GB storage. It has a 3,300 mAh battery with OnePlus' proprietary Dash Charge technology and a 1080p AMOLED display with DCI-P3 wide colour gamut.

Following criticism of prior models' camera quality, OnePlus implemented an electronically stabilized 16 MP Sony Exmor IMX398 camera module along with a 20 MP Sony Exmor IMX350 telephoto lens, capable of producing a bokeh effect. The front camera uses a 16 MP IMX371 lens. OnePlus claims that the dual camera enables a 1.6X optical zoom; however, independent testing has only reproduced a 1.33X optical zoom. DxOMark gave the camera a rating of 87, which is above that of the iPhone 7.

=== Software ===
==== stock firmware ====
The company released the device tree and kernel sources a few days prior to the phone's launch. It has TWRP and root access.

OnePlus 5 was launched with OxygenOS 4.5 based on Android 7.1.1. One feature in OxygenOS is the reading mode.

OxygenOS 5.0 (later updated to 5.0.1) was released in late-2017, bringing Android 8.0 Oreo to the OnePlus 5. Among the changes are an updated launcher, redesigned camera UI, and several system optimizations.

The “Face Unlock” facial recognition feature, originally shipped with the OnePlus 5T, was added to the OnePlus 5 in OxygenOS 5.0.2.

The device was updated to OxygenOS 10 based on Android 10. There will be no official Android 11 for the Oneplus 5.

==== Custom ROMs ====
The OnePlus 5 allows for bootloader unlocking and custom ROM installs, and as a result the phone has received unofficial software support. degoogled ROMs can bring the phone up to Android 15 and include CrDroid, lineageOS or LineageOS with microG.

=== Network compatibility ===
The OnePlus 5 includes only a single variant for cellular networks worldwide.

Model	GSM Bands	CDMA Bands	UMTS Bands	TD-SCDMA Bands	LTE Bands
A5000	Quad Band	BC0	1, 2, 4, 5, 8	34, 39	FDD: 1, 2, 3, 4, 5, 7, 8, 12, 17, 18, 19, 20, 25, 26, 28, 29, 30, 66 TDD: 38, 39, 40, 41

== Reception ==
=== Critical reception ===
The majority of the initial reviews of the phone were positive. Engadget praised the phone's specifications in its price bracket. The Verge concurred and noted its departure from previous OnePlus phone designs, but pointed out design similarities with the iPhone 7 Plus. Wired noted that despite the phone's camera specifications, the photo quality was mediocre; however, it commended the smoothness and battery life of the device.

XDA Developers noted that the phone was locking the CPU and GPU at their maximum clock speeds while in certain games and benchmarks in order to inflate their benchmark scores, resulting in the phone reaching external temperatures as high as 50 °C. OnePlus co-founder, Carl Pei, defended the actions by saying that users "want to see the full potential of their device without interference from tampering" and that "Every OEM has proprietary performance profiles for their devices".

=== Known issues ===
External videos
- OnePlus 5 Jelly Scrolling YouTube

Users noted that the handset had a "jelly scrolling effect" due to an inverted display. OnePlus noted that this was not a defect.

Some phones were known to reboot when dialing 911, preventing users from calling emergency services. OnePlus quickly issued an update (OxygenOS 4.5.6) to fix this issue, and claimed that it happened as a result of not using the stock dialing app. OnePlus later said that the problem was "related to a modem memory usage issue", and that it was only a "random occurrence" for some users on VoLTE networks. Some users, after updating the phone from Android 9 to Android 10, experience a failure of the fingerprint sensor. OnePlus said this will be addressed in an upcoming patch.

=== Sales ===
The OnePlus 5 became the company's fastest selling smartphone, according to CEO Carl Pei. It also sold better than the previous generation's OnePlus 3T.

During the week leading up to the device being revealed, a television advertisement was shown in the final of the 2017 ICC Champions Trophy between Pakistan and India, starring OnePlus brand ambassador and Indian film star Amitabh Bachchan.

OnePlus 5 went on sale in India on 22 June 2017 on Amazon, the OnePlus India online store, and the OnePlus Experience store in Bengaluru. The Soft Gold variant went on sale on August 9, 2017.

Preceded by OnePlus 3T	OnePlus 5; 2017	Succeeded by OnePlus 5T
