= OnePlus 3T =

Smartphone made by OnePlus

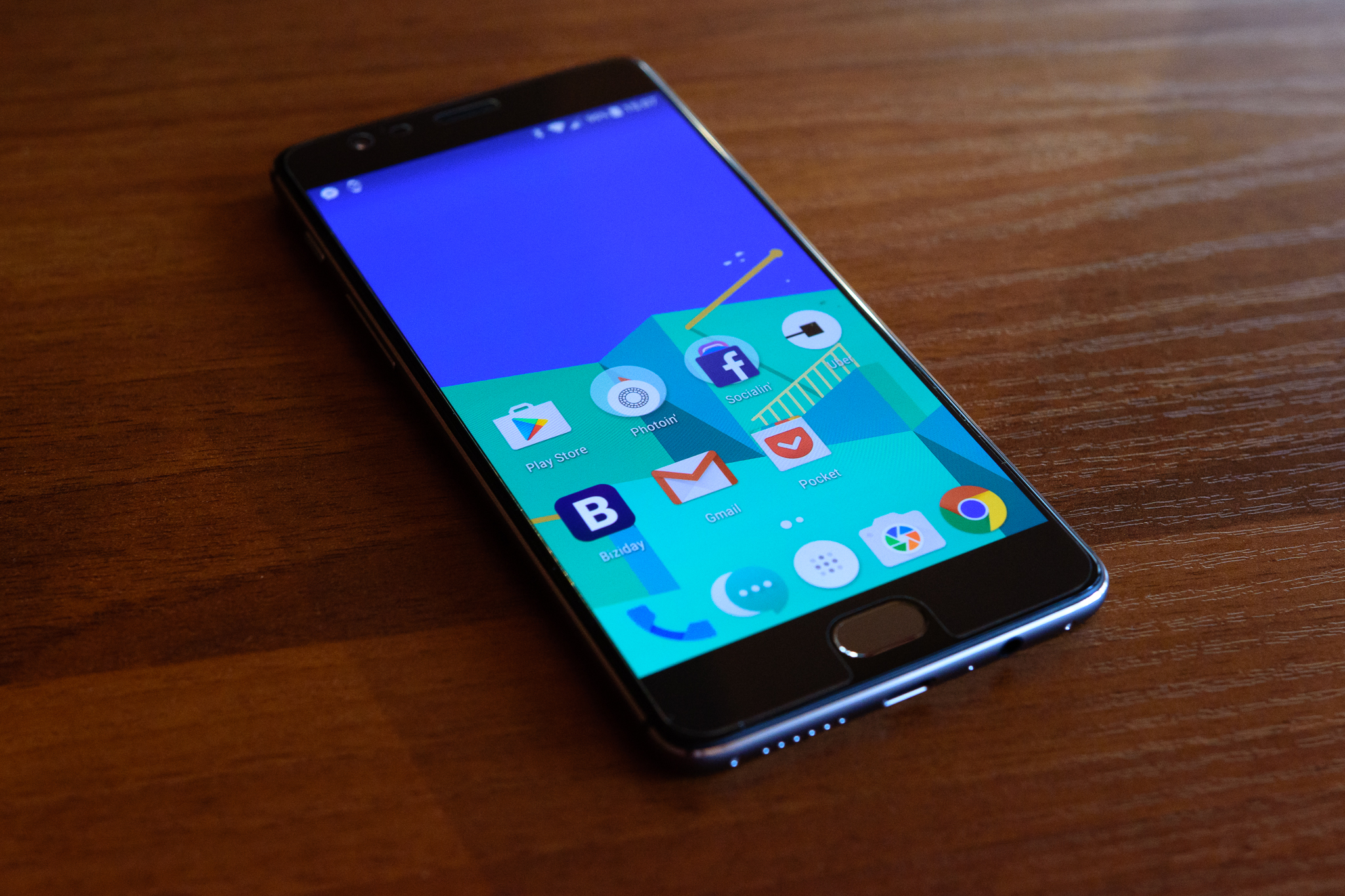
- Brand: OnePlus
- Manufacturer: OnePlus
- Type: Smartphone
- First released: 15 November 2016
- Availability by region: Late 2016
- Discontinued: 9 May 2017 (128 GB variant only)
- Predecessor: OnePlus 3
- Successor: OnePlus 5
- Compatible networks: 2G, 3G, and 4G
- Form factor: Slate
- Dimensions: 152.7 mm (6.01 in) H 74.7 mm (2.94 in) W 7.35 mm (0.29 in) D
- Weight: 158 g
- Operating system: OxygenOS (Global) HydrogenOS (Mainland China) Android Marshmallow, Android Nougat, Android Oreo, Android Pie
- System-on-chip: Qualcomm Snapdragon 821
- CPU: Kryo 2×2.35 GHz + 2×2.2 GHz
- GPU: Adreno 530
- Memory: 6 GB LPDDR4 RAM
- Storage: 64 or 128 GB UFS 2.0
- Battery: 3,400 mAh
- Rear camera: 16 MP Sony IMX298
- Front camera: 16 MP Samsung 3P8SP
- Display: 5.5" 1920×1080 px resolution (401 ppi) optic AMOLED
- Sound: Bottom-facing speaker, 3.5mm stereo audio jack
- Connectivity: 3G, 4G VoLTE, WiFi 802.11a/b/g/n/ac, Bluetooth 4.2, NFC, USB-C
- Data inputs: Fingerprint sensor, accelerometer, gyroscope, proximity sensor, electronic compass, GNSS (GPS/GLONASS/BeiDou)
- Model: A3000 (North America); A3003 (Worldwide, excluding China and North America); A3010 (China)
- Codename: oneplus3t
- SAR: Head 0.995 W/kg (1g); Body 0.645 W/kg
- Other: Vibration motor, RGB LED notification light
- Website: oneplus.net/3t

The OnePlus 3T (also abbreviated as OP3T) is a smartphone made by OnePlus. It is the successor to the OnePlus 3 and was revealed on 15 November 2016.

It is an incremental update to the company's flagship phone being released only 6 months later. It features the identical Optic AMOLED display, the same Sony IMX298 rear camera sensor, and the same Dash Charge technology as its predecessor.

The OnePlus 3T is also the first phone from OnePlus to be available for immediate delivery (in Europe and North America), without long waiting times from being out of stock.

== Release ==
The OnePlus 3T was released on 15 November 2016 via a Facebook live video. It went on sale in a new Gunmetal colour with the Soft Gold option being released soon after much like the OnePlus 3. The OnePlus 3T has 6 GB of RAM, the option of 64 or 128 GB of UFS 2.0 storage, and a Qualcomm Snapdragon 821 processor.

To celebrate the 20th anniversary of Colette, a French high fashion, streetwear, and accessory retailer, OnePlus and Colette partnered to produce 250 exclusive limited edition black versions of the phone featuring a Colette logo at the back of the phone. This exclusive edition of the phone went on sale in Paris at a Colette store on 21 March 2017.

== Specifications ==
=== Hardware ===
The OnePlus 3T has the same metal back design, compared with the OnePlus 3, with anodised aluminium and curved edges. The device is available in two colors, a new Gunmetal (black/gray), which is slightly darker than the Graphite color used in the OnePlus 3 and Soft Gold (white/gold) which was released on 6 January 2017. A limited edition Midnight Black colored phone was available to purchase on 28 March 2017, it featured an all black backing similar to the Colette exclusive limited edition but without the logo.

The OnePlus 3T's darker aluminium backing is the only physical characteristic that allows it to be distinguished from the OnePlus 3. Users can also purchase the same protective covers in Bamboo, Rosewood, Black Apricot, Karbon and Sandstone, which takes care of the camera hump and evens it with the phone.

It features the same Optic AMOLED display with Corning Gorilla Glass 4 protection, in the same casing of the OnePlus 3. The OnePlus 3T now comes in options for 64 GB or 128 GB of UFS 2.0 storage. The phone also features the same alert slider which users can use to quickly toggle between alert modes from silent to priority to all notifications. It includes NFC and the same fast finger scanner which can unlock the device in approximately 0.3 seconds.

The OnePlus 3T contains the same rear-facing Sony IMX298 sensor with 16 MP, 1.1 μm, f/2.0, Optical image stabilization (OIS) and Electronic Image Stabilization (EIS), as the predecessor. The phone has an upgraded front-facing Samsung 3P8SP sensor with 16 MP, 1.0 μm, f/2.0 and EIS.

The phone once again has the same OnePlus quick charging capabilities named Dash Charge with the ability to gain 60% of the charge in 30 minutes. According to the company, this is accomplished by doing all the power transforming required for direct input to the battery in the power brick supplied, not within the phone itself, reducing heat on the device. Additionally, the power brick can contain larger, dedicated electronics, whereas any power processing on a phone has to use smaller and cooler equipment, reducing the speed of charging.

The phone comes with a faster Qualcomm Snapdragon 821 processor and a bigger 3400 mAh battery.

=== Software ===
The OnePlus 3T came out of the box with Android 6.0.1 Marshmallow, as OxygenOS version 3.5. The last version of 6.0.1 released was OxygenOS version 3.5.4 on 14 December 2016.

OnePlus released the first stable version of Android 7.0 Nougat on 31 December 2016, with the release of OxygenOS 4.0. The last version of 7.0 was released as OxygenOS version 4.0.3 on 9 February 2017.

OnePlus then released a first stable version of Android 7.1.1 Nougat on 16 March 2017, with the release of OxygenOS version 4.1.0. The last version of 7.1.1 as OxygenOS 4.1.x was released as version 4.1.7 on 22 August 2017.

A major stable update (still based on Android 7.1.1 Nougat) was released on 25 September 2017, as OxygenOS version 4.5.0. The last version of 7.1.1 was released as OxygenOS version 4.5.1 on 16 October 2017.

After owners of the phone expressed concern whether their phone would be abandoned after the release of the OnePlus 5, it was confirmed by Pete Lau, the CEO, that the phone, and its predecessor would eventually receive a software update to Android O. It was also announced that it would be the last major update.

On 19 November 2017, the first stable Android 8.0 Oreo update was released, as OxygenOS version 5.0.

In May 2018, OnePlus released OxygenOS version 5.0.3 with the same Face Unlock feature present on the OnePlus 5T for the 3T and its predecessor several months after promising it.

On 30 July 2018, OnePlus updated their support policy choosing to provide Android P as the last update for the OnePlus 3T instead of Android 8.1.

The last version of 8.0 was released as OxygenOS 5.0.8 on 27 November 2018.

Stable Android 9.0 Pie for the 3T was released on 22 May 2019 as OxygenOS version 9.0.3 (OnePlus choosing to now synchronise their OS version numbering with Android).

The last version of 9.0 Pie was released on 20 November 2019, as OxygenOS 9.0.6. It was also confirmed this would be the last official update released for the 3T by OnePlus.

=== Network compatibility ===
The OnePlus 3T has the following compatibility .

Model	id	Carriers/Regions	GSM bands	CDMA bands	UMTS bands (3G)	TD-SCDMA (3G)	LTE bands	Notes
A3010	TENAA id:02-B182-163788	China	Quad	BC0	1, 2, 5, 8	34, 39	FDD 1, 3, 5, 7, 8 TDD 38, 39, 40, 41	Factory OS is HydrogenOS, but can be changed to OxygenOS.
A3000	FCC id: 2ABZ2-A3000	North America	Quad	BC0	1, 2, 4, 5, 8	—N/a	FDD 1, 2, 4, 5, 7, 8, 12, 17, 30	Factory OS is OxygenOS, but can be changed to HydrogenOS.
A3003	—N/a	EMEA	Quad	—N/a	1, 2, 5, 8	—N/a	FDD 1, 3, 5, 7, 8, 20 TDD 38, 40	Factory OS is OxygenOS, but can be changed to HydrogenOS.

== Reception ==
OnePlus 3T generally received a good reception. It was especially praised for its good performance and price to quality ratio. The OnePlus 3T was considered too similar to OnePlus 3 and the increase of the front camera's megapixels was thought to be ineffective in many reviews. Many critics felt the difference was so small that OnePlus 3 owners should not upgrade to OnePlus 3T.

=== Criticism ===
XDA Developers discovered that with the launch of the Android 7.0 Nougat update, OnePlus introduced a software defeat device into the code of the OnePlus 3 and the OnePlus 3T, relaxing thermal throttling and increasing clock speeds when the phone detected that it was in a benchmark app, in order to boost benchmark scores. This came as a bit of a shock to much of the Android enthusiast community, as every major manufacturer had removed their benchmark cheating code following the massive backlash that occurred when it was originally discovered on other devices in 2013. OnePlus immediately stated that they would be removing the benchmark cheating from future software versions, and that they weren't sure how it made it into a production build. OnePlus later reversed this decision with the OnePlus 5, reintroducing the software that locked clock speeds to their maximum while in a benchmark.

Preceded by OnePlus 3	OnePlus 3T; 2016	Succeeded by OnePlus 5
