= OnePlus 3 =

Smartphone made by the Chinese manufacturer OnePlus

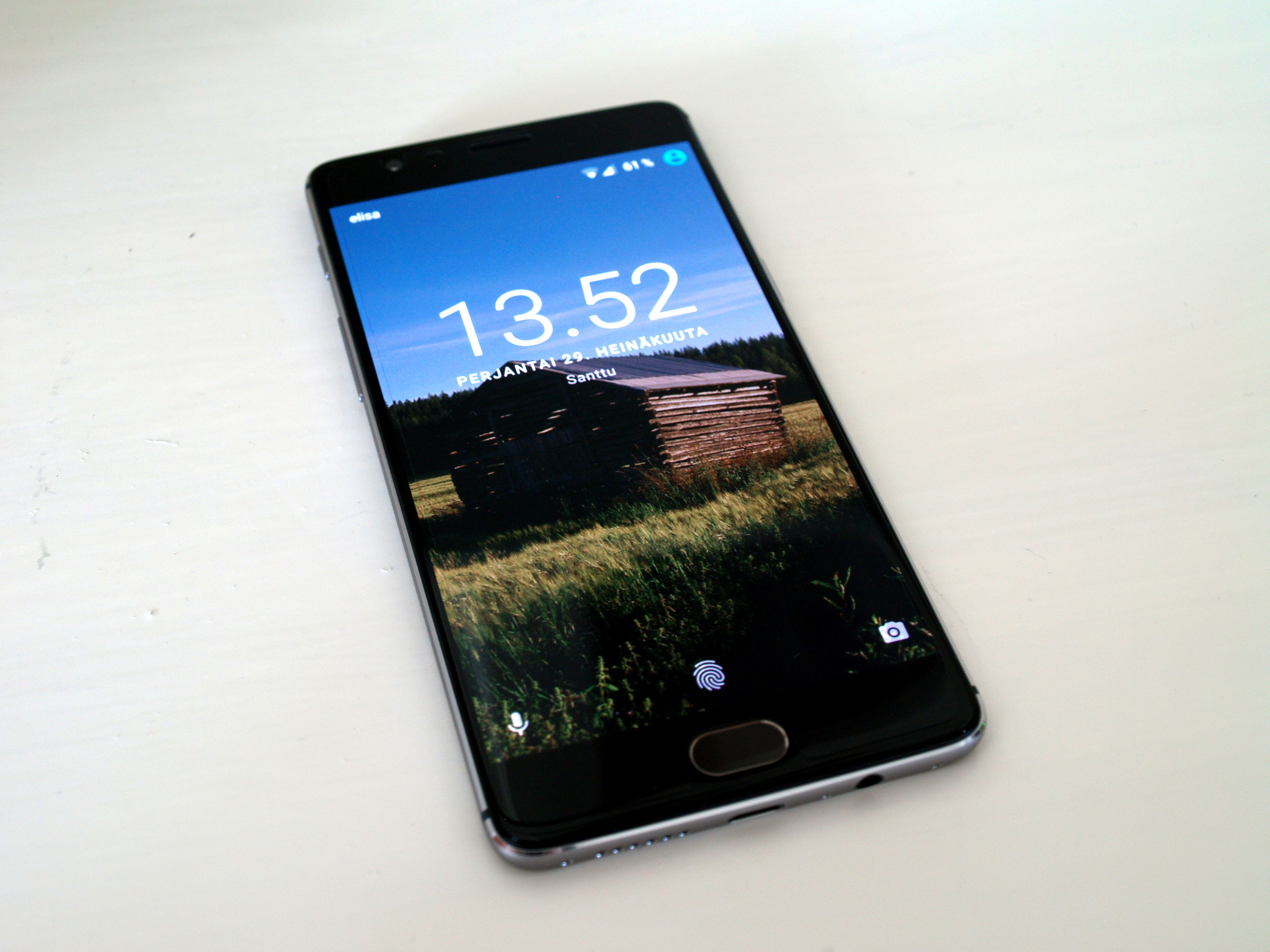
- Manufacturer: OnePlus
- Type: Smartphone
- First released: 14 June 2016
- Discontinued: 17 November 2016 (North America and Europe only)
- Predecessor: OnePlus 2
- Successor: OnePlus 3T
- Compatible networks: 2G, 3G and 4G
- Form factor: Slate
- Dimensions: 152.7 mm (6.01 in) H 74.7 mm (2.94 in) W 7.35 mm (0.289 in) D
- Weight: 155 g (5 oz)
- Operating system: OxygenOS (Global); HydrogenOS (Mainland China)
- System-on-chip: Qualcomm Snapdragon 820
- CPU: Kryo 2x2.2 GHz + 2x1.6 GHz
- GPU: Adreno 530
- Memory: 6 GB LPDDR4 RAM
- Storage: 64 GB UFS 2.0
- Battery: 3000 mAh
- Rear camera: 16 MP Sony IMX298
- Front camera: 8 MP Sony IMX179
- Display: 5.5 in 1920 x 1080 pixel resolution (401ppi) AMOLED
- Connectivity: 3G, 4G VoLTE, WiFi, NFC, Bluetooth 4.2, USB-C
- Data inputs: GNSS (GPS/GLONASS/BeiDou)
- Model: A3000; A3003
- Codename: oneplus3
- Website: oneplus.net/3

The OnePlus 3 (also abbreviated as OP3) is a smartphone produced by OnePlus. It was revealed on 14 June 2016. The phone was unveiled in a virtual reality event and OnePlus offered its customers Loop VR headsets to experience the event using their phones, giving away 30,000 free headsets in lieu of a traditional press conference.

== History ==
=== Release ===
The OnePlus 3 is the first OnePlus device to not be part of the invite system, which OnePlus had used for its last three devices to regulate flow with inadequate manufacturing for the inevitable high demand.

Following some controversy, the OxygenOS 3.2.1 update began rollout on 7 July 2016, with improved RAM management, an alternate sRGB display mode in developer options, and various bug fixes.

=== Discontinuation ===
An updated version of the device, called the OnePlus 3T, was announced by the company on 15 November 2016 and released on 22 November. It improves upon the OnePlus 3 by including the newer Snapdragon 821 chipset, a 16MP front camera, along with a 3400mAh non-removable battery. Sales of the OnePlus 3 were discontinued on 17 November with the OnePlus 3T replacing it. It was also announced the phone will share the same software update cycle with its successor starting from Android N.

After owners of the phone expressed concern whether their phone would be abandoned after the release of the OnePlus 5, it was confirmed by OnePlus CEO Pete Lau that the phone and its predecessor would eventually receive a software update to Android O. It was also announced that it would be the last major update. On 8 September 2017, the phone started receiving Android O in closed beta with public beta updates following soon after as part of their community beta program. As of 19 September 2017, Android 8.0 Oreo has been delivered via software update.

==== Android 9 Update ====
On 30 June 2018, OnePlus updated their update policy for the OnePlus 3 and 3T, opting to update to Android Pie (9.0) instead of Android 8.1, and discontinued their Android 8 OpenBeta program. The first stable Android Pie update was rolled out to devices in May 2019. Including security updates and bug fixes, the latest firmware for the 3/3T is OxygenOS 9.0.6 based on Android 9.

== Specifications ==
The OnePlus 3 features a new metal back design, similar to that of an HTC M9 or later, with anodised aluminium and curved edges. The device is available in two colors, Graphite (black/gray) and Soft Gold (white/gold, released later in August 2016). Additionally, users can purchase protective covers in Kevlar or black apricot wood, bamboo, rosewood, and sandstone which takes care of the camera hump and evens it with the phone.

The device is slightly smaller than its predecessor, the OnePlus 2. It is 2.5mm thinner, 0.9mm shorter, and 0.2mm narrower, but still has the same screen size, at 5.5 inches (140 mm) across diagonally. The display is still 1920×1080 px, comparable to that of the previous two models, but the 3 is the first flagship OnePlus to have an optic AMOLED display. As is typical for most smartphones, the OnePlus 3 features Corning Gorilla Glass 4 protection.

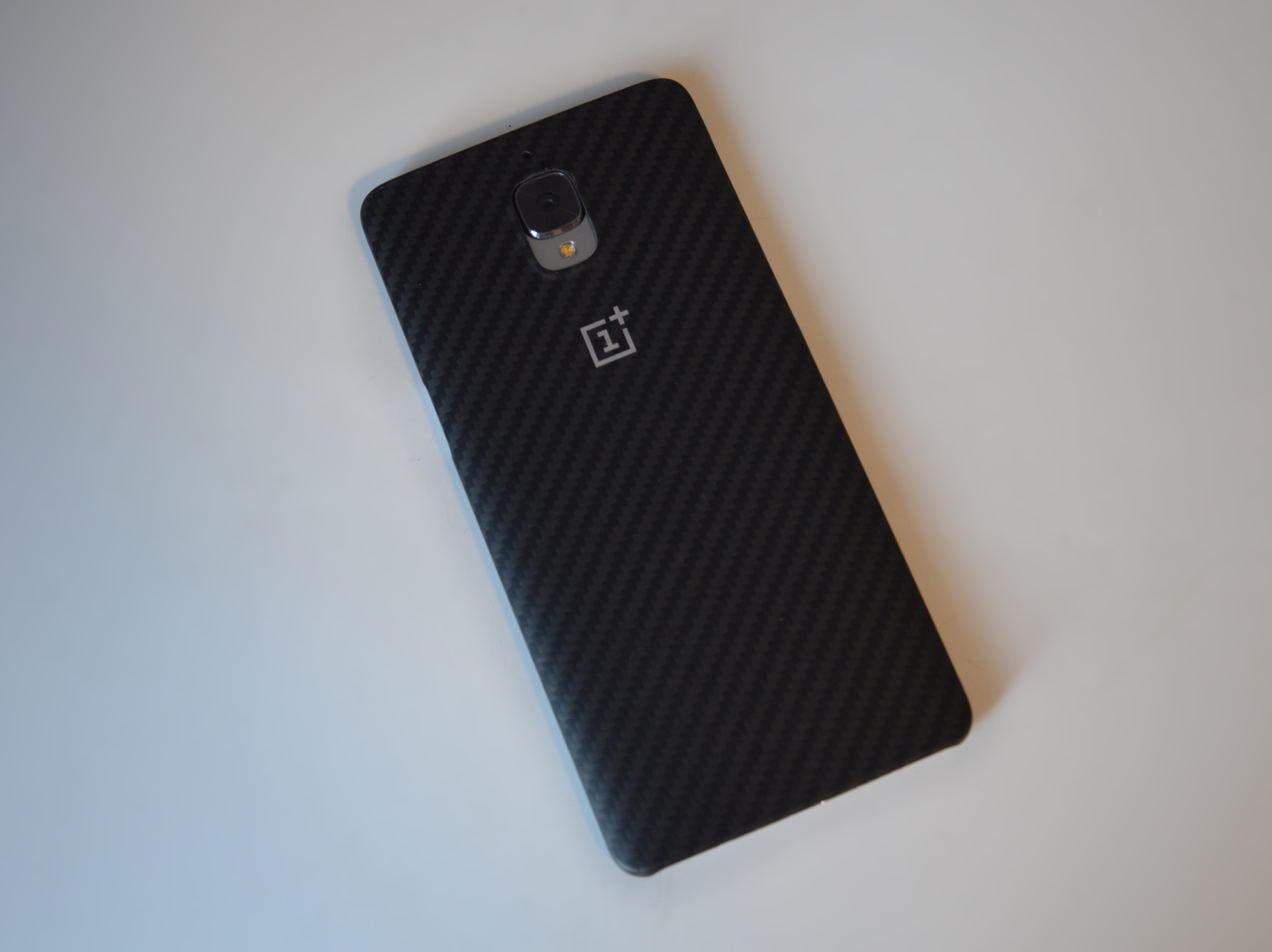
The OnePlus 3 in OnePlus' StyleSwap cover.

The OnePlus 3 is also the first OnePlus phone to ship with only 64 GB of storage available, as all other OnePlus devices have shipped with a 16 GB option also. The onboard storage is UFS 2.0, but there is no option for memory expansion via an SD card. The OnePlus 3 supports Dual SIM cards, but lacks LTE band 13, which means it will not work with Verizon. The OnePlus 3 will also not work with Sprint due to Sprint's use of an IMEI/MEID whitelist which does not include most OnePlus devices.

For the rear-facing camera, the OnePlus 3 has a 16 MP f/2.0 Sony IMX 298 sensor, with both optical image stabilisation and electronic image stabilisation. It is capable of 4K video at 30fps, and 720p slo-mo video at 120fps. Further, it includes support for shooting RAW images, allowing greater control of the image to the user. The front camera is an 8 MP f/2.0 Sony IMX179 sensor, with 1080p at 30fps video and fixed focus.

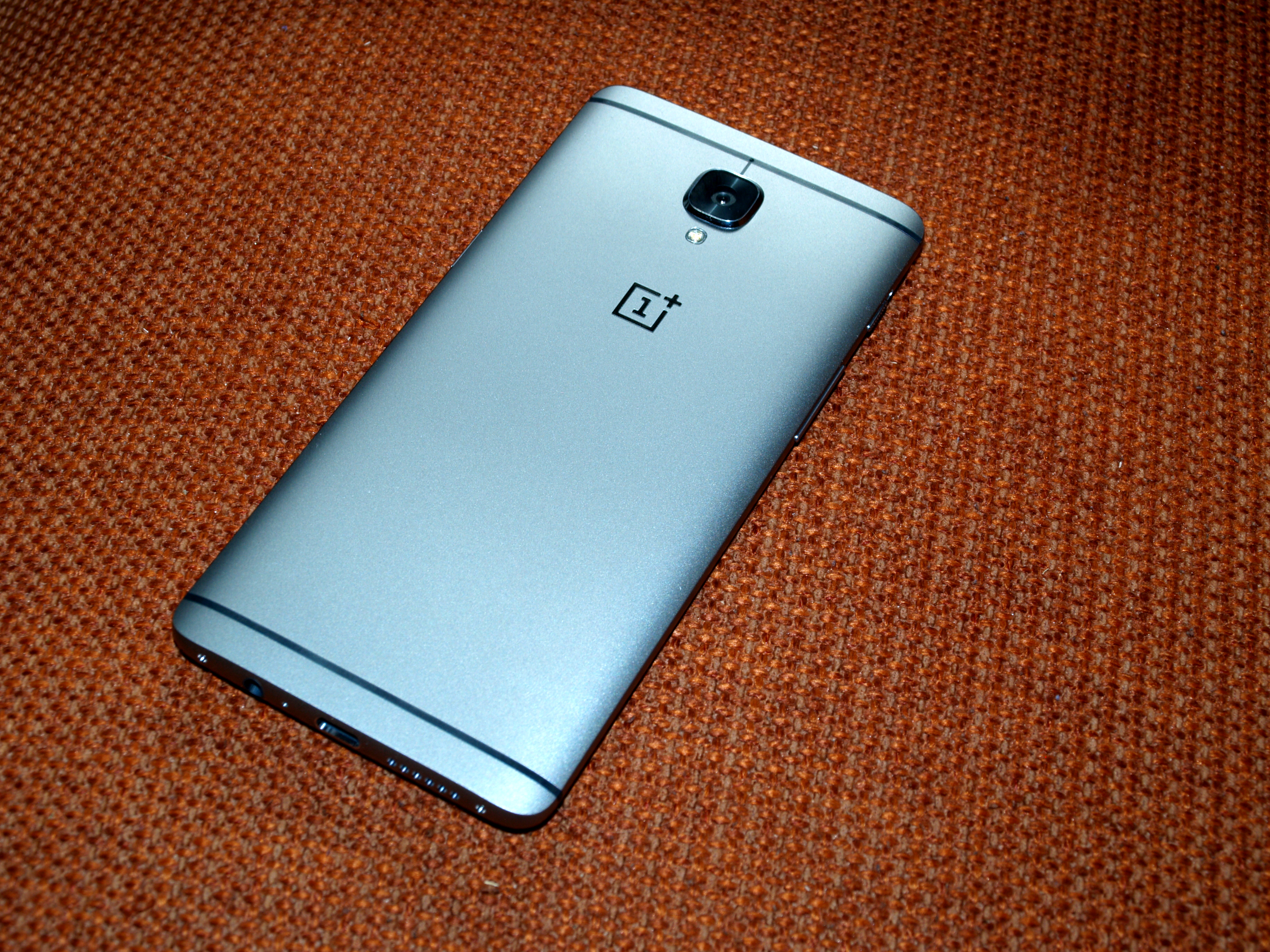
Rear of the phone.

One new feature to the OnePlus 3 is Dash Charge. It is a custom version of OnePlus' parent company's (OPPO Electronics) VOOC Charging. The feature is made possible by the processor, which has Quick Charge 3.0 support. According to the company, the battery can achieve a 60% or more charge within 30 minutes. This is accomplished by doing all the power transforming required for direct input to the battery in the power brick supplied, not within the phone itself, reducing heat on the device. Additionally, the power brick can contain larger, dedicated electronics, whereas any power processing on a phone has to use smaller and cooler equipment, reducing the speed of charging.

Other features include the alert slider, originally added to the OnePlus 2. NFC was added again from the OnePlus One (as it was absent from OnePlus 2).

A fingerprint scanner is also found at the bottom of the screen. It is estimated to unlock after approximately 0.3 seconds, becoming one of the fastest scanners on a phone. The fingerprint scanner also has a ceramic coating to avoid scratches.

=== Network compatibility ===
| Model | id | Carriers/Regions | GSM bands | CDMA bands | UMTS bands (3G) | TD-SCDMA (3G) | LTE bands | Notes |
|---|---|---|---|---|---|---|---|---|
| A3000 | TENAA id:02-B182-161638 | China | Quad | BC0 | 1 / 2 / 5 / 8 | 34 / 39 | FDD 1 / 3 / 7 TDD 38 / 39 / 40 | Factory OS is HydrogenOS, but can be changed to OxygenOS. |
| A3000 | FCC id:2ABZ2-A3000 | North America | Quad | BC0 | 1 / 2 / 4 / 5 / 8 | —N/a | FDD 1 / 2 / 4 / 5 / 7 / 12 / 17 / 30 | Factory OS is OxygenOS, but can be changed to HydrogenOS. |
| A3003 | —N/a | Europe / Asia | Quad | —N/a | 1 / 2 / 5 / 8 | —N/a | FDD 1 / 3 / 5 / 7 / 8 / 20 TDD 38 / 40 | Factory OS is OxygenOS, but can be changed to HydrogenOS. |

== Reception ==
General reception included positive reviews from both critiques and reviewers for a premium designed phone for an affordable price. But reviewers were quick to point out the camera bezel with a subpar camera. Reviewers also critiqued the phone not having an SD card slot as the phone only came with 64 GB of storage. Reports also claim that the phone experienced heating issues. Several reports also claimed that despite the OnePlus 3's 6 GB of RAM, the phone could not handle more than 3 or 4 applications at one time. Ars Technica added that OnePlus configured its build of Android to impose an artificial limit of 20 applications stored in RAM at a time. OnePlus indicated this was a deliberate choice to maximize battery life.

The Verge gave the OnePlus 3 an 8.6/10, praising its great build quality, high performance and sharp display. However, The Verge had some reservations about the phone, noting that it does not work on the US Verizon or Sprint networks, it does not have an SD Card slot, and the quick charging is limited to a OnePlus-specific cable and power brick. Nonetheless, they conclude that "The OnePlus 3 is the rare kind of phone [we] can recommend without reservations".

On launch, XDA Developers called the OnePlus 3 the "Perfect Canvas for the Spec-Hungry Tinkerer". In January they discovered that with the launch of the Android 7.0 Nougat update, OnePlus introduced a software defeat device into the code of the OnePlus 3 and the OnePlus 3T, relaxing thermal throttling and increasing clock speeds when the phone detected that it was in a benchmark app, in order to boost benchmark scores. This came as a bit of a shock to much of the Android enthusiast community, as every major manufacturer had removed their benchmark cheating code following the massive backlash that occurred when it was originally discovered on other devices in 2013. OnePlus immediately stated that they would be removing the benchmark cheating from future software versions, and that they weren't sure how it made it into a production build. OnePlus later reversed this decision with the OnePlus 5, reintroducing the software that locked clock speeds to their maximum while in a benchmark.

| Preceded by OnePlus 2 | OnePlus 3; 2016 | Succeeded by OnePlus 3T |
