= OnePlus Nord 2T 5G =

OnePlus smartphone

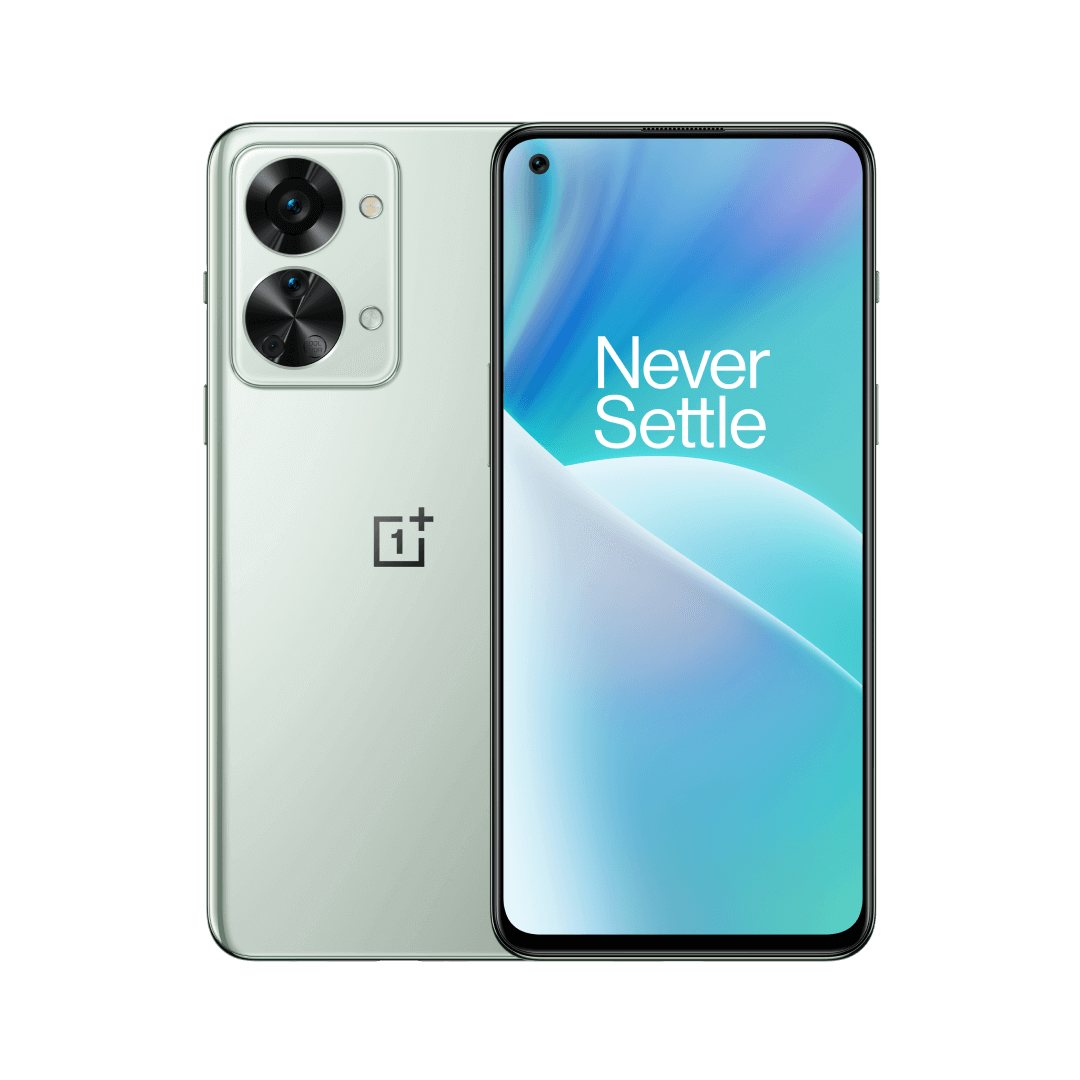
- OnePlus Nord 2T in Jade fog
- Brand: OnePlus
- Type: Smartphone
- Series: Nord
- First released: May 19, 2022; 4 years ago
- Predecessor: OnePlus Nord 2 5G
- Successor: OnePlus Nord 3 5G
- Related: OnePlus Nord CE 2 5G; OnePlus Nord CE 2 Lite 5G
- Compatible networks: GSM bands: 850/900/1800/1900 MHz; CDMA bands: 800/1700/1900 MHz; UMTS bands: B1, B2, B4, B5, B8, B9, B19; CDMA2000 bands: 1×EVDO; LTE bands: 1-5/7/8/12/17-20/26/28/32/34/38-41/66; 5G bands: 1/3/5/7/8/20/28/38/40/41/66/77/78/79
- Form factor: Slate
- Colors: Gray Shadow, Jade Fog
- Dimensions: 159.1×73.2×8.2 mm (6.26×2.88×0.32 in)
- Weight: 190 g (6.7 oz)
- Operating system: Original: Android 12 with OxygenOS 12.1; Current: Android 14 with OxygenOS 14.1
- System-on-chip: MediaTek Dimensity 1300 (6 nm)
- CPU: Octa-core (1x 3.0 GHz Cortex-A78, 3x 2.6 GHz Cortex-A78, 4x 2.0 GHz Cortex-A55)
- GPU: Mali-G77 MC9
- Memory: 8 or 12 GB LPDDR4X RAM
- Storage: 128 or 256 GB UFS 3.1
- Removable storage: None
- SIM: Dual SIM (Nano-SIM)
- Battery: Non-removable, Li-Po 4500 mAh
- Charging: 80 W SUPERVOOC fast charging Power Delivery
- Rear camera: 50 MP Sony IMX766, f/1.8, 24 mm (wide), 1/1.56", 1 μm, PDAF, OIS + 8 MP, f/2.2, 120° (ultrawide) + 2 MP, f/2.2 (depth); Dual-LED flash, HDR, panorama Video: 4K@30fps, 1080p@30/60/120/480fps, 720p@30/60/240/960fps, gyro-EIS
- Front camera: 32 MP Sony IMX615, f/2.4 (wide), 1/2.8", 0.8 μm Auto-HDR; Video: 1080p@30fps, gyro-EIS
- Display: AMOLED capacitive touchscreen 6.43 in (163 mm) 2400 × 1080 1080p, (409 ppi with 20:9 aspect ratio), 90 Hz refresh rate, Gorilla Glass 5, 16M colors, HDR10+/HLG, DCI-P3 support
- Sound: Stereo speakers
- Connectivity: USB-C 2.0, Bluetooth 5.2 (A2DP, LE, aptX HD), NFC, Wi-Fi 802.11 a/b/g/n/ac/6 (dual-band, Wi-Fi Direct), GPS, GLONASS, BeiDou, Galileo, NavIC
- Codename: Karen
- Made in: China
- Other: Fingerprint (under display, optical), proximity, accelerometer, gyroscope, compass
- Website: Official website

The OnePlus Nord 2T 5G is a mid-range smartphone developed by OnePlus. It is part of the Nord series and serves as the successor to the OnePlus Nord 2 5G. It was unveiled on May 19, 2022, alongside the OnePlus Nord CE 2 Lite 5G and the OnePlus Nord Buds.

== Specifications ==
=== Design ===
The front and back panels are made of Corning Gorilla Glass 5, while the frame is made of plastic. The bottom features a slot for two SIM cards, a microphone, a USB-C port, and a speaker, while the top houses a second microphone. The volume buttons are located on the left side, and the alert slider and power button are on the right. The smartphone features dual speakers forming a stereo pair, with the earpiece doubling as the second speaker. The smartphone was sold in the following colors:

Color	Name
	Gray Shadow
	Jade Fog

=== Hardware ===
The OnePlus Nord 2T 5G was the first smartphone to feature the MediaTek Dimensity 1300 processor with a Mali-G77 MC9 GPU, which is a slightly improved version of the Dimensity 1200-AI found in its predecessor. The battery has a capacity of 4500 mAh and supports 80 W SUPERVOOC fast charging.

The display is a 6.43" AMOLED panel with Full HD+ resolution (2400 × 1080), a pixel density of 409 ppi, a 20:9 aspect ratio, a 90 Hz refresh rate, and a circular punch-hole cutout for the front camera located in the top-left corner. An optical fingerprint scanner is also built into the display.

The OnePlus Nord 2T 5G was sold in 8 GB/128 GB and 12 GB/256 GB configurations.

=== Camera ===
The smartphone features a triple main camera setup consisting of a 50 MP Sony IMX766 wide-angle lens with an f/1.8 aperture, phase-detection autofocus (PDAF), and optical image stabilization, an 8 MP ultrawide lens with an f/2.2 aperture and a 120° field of view, and a 2 MP depth sensor with an f/2.2 aperture. The OnePlus Nord 2T 5G also has a 32 MP wide-angle front camera with an f/2.4 aperture. The main camera can record video at 4K@30fps, while the front camera records at 1080p@30fps.

=== Software ===
The smartphone was released running OxygenOS 12.1 based on Android 12 and was updated to OxygenOS 14.1 based on Android 14.
