= N200 =

N200 may refer to:

- N200 (neuroscience), a neurological event
- OnePlus Nord N200 5G, a smartphone model by OnePlus
- Wuling Hongtu, a motor vehicle which is marketed as Chevrolet N200 in certain markets
