= OnePlus Nord N10 5G =

Android-based smartphone manufactured by OnePlus

- Brand: OnePlus
- Manufacturer: OnePlus
- Successor: OnePlus Nord N20 5G
- Related: OnePlus Nord N100 and OnePlus Nord
- Dimensions: 163 mm (6.4 in) H 74.7 mm (2.94 in) W 9 mm (0.35 in) D
- Weight: 190 g (6.7 oz)
- Operating system: OxygenOS 10.5 (based on Android 10)
- System-on-chip: Qualcomm Snapdragon 690 5G (8nm)
- CPU: Octa-core (2x2.0 GHz Kryo 560 Gold & 6x1.7 GHz Kryo 560 Silver)
- GPU: Adreno 619L
- Memory: 6 GB LPDDR4x RAM
- Storage: 128 GB UFS 2.1
- Removable storage: microSD
- Battery: 4,300 mAh
- Charging: 30 W fast-charging
- Rear camera: Quad: 64 MP f/1.79 wide, 1/1.72", 0.8 μm, PDAF; 8 MP f/2.25 119˚ ultrawide; 5 MP f/2.4 depth sensor; 2 MP f/2.4 macro
- Front camera: 16 MP f/2.05
- Display: 6.49 in (165 mm) (~83.5% screen-to-body ratio) 1080 × 2400 FHD+ 90Hz IPS LCD, 20:9 ratio (~406 ppi density)
- Sound: Stereo speakers
- Data inputs: USB-C, 3.5mm audio jack: Fingerprint (rear-mounted); Accelerometer; Electronic Compass; Gyroscope; Ambient Light; Proximity; SAR sensor
- Codename: Billie
- Website: www.oneplus.com/n10-5g

The OnePlus Nord N10 5G is an Android smartphone manufactured by OnePlus as part of its Nord series. It was released in October 2020 alongside the Nord N100.

== Specifications ==
=== Hardware ===
The OnePlus Nord N10 5G has a 6.49 in (165 mm) 1080 × 2400 FHD+ 90Hz IPS LCD with a 20:9 aspect ratio, ~83.5% screen-to-body ratio, and a ~406 ppi pixel density. The front glass is Gorilla Glass 3, while the back and frame are constructed of plastic. The phone itself measures 163 x 74.7 x 8.95 mm (6.4 x 2.94 x 0.35 in) and weighs 190 g (6.7 oz). It has a 4,300 mAh non-removable battery capable of up to Warp Charge 30T (30 W). The phone is powered by the Qualcomm Snapdragon 690 5G chip (8nm), with an octa-core processor (2x2.0 GHz Kryo 560 Gold & 6x1.7 GHz Kryo 560 Silver) and an Adreno 619L GPU. The phone comes with 128 GB of UFS 2.1 storage (which can be expanded via microSD) and 6 GB LPDDR4x RAM.

=== Camera ===
The Nord N10 5G has a quad-camera setup on the rear, consisting of a 64 MP f/1.8 wide (1/1.72", 0.8 μm, PDAF), an 8 MP f/2.3 119˚ ultrawide, a 2 MP f/2.4 depth sensor, and a 2 MP f/2.4 macro camera (for close-up shots). The cameras are arranged in an L shape in the top left corner of the back plastic, nearly identical to the camera setup of the Samsung Galaxy A51. The main camera can shoot 4K video at up to 30 frames per second (fps) and slow-motion video at up 240 fps. Other camera features include CINE aspect ratio video recording, UltraShot HDR, Nightscape, Macro, Portrait, Pro Mode, Panorama, AI Scene Detection, and RAW Image. There is a single front-facing, 16 MP f/2.05 selfie camera, which is located in a cutout in the top left corner of the display.

=== Software ===
The Nord N10 5G was released with OxygenOS 10.5, which was based on Android 10. In late July 2021 it was updated to OxygenOS 11.0, based on Android 11. According to the company, the phone will not receive an Android 12 update. The phone does, however, support the custom rom known as LineageOS, which does offer Android 17 as of right now.

== See also ==
- OnePlus Nord N100
- OnePlus Nord
- OnePlus 8T
