= OnePlus X =

Android smartphone

OnePlus X (Oppo A30 in China)
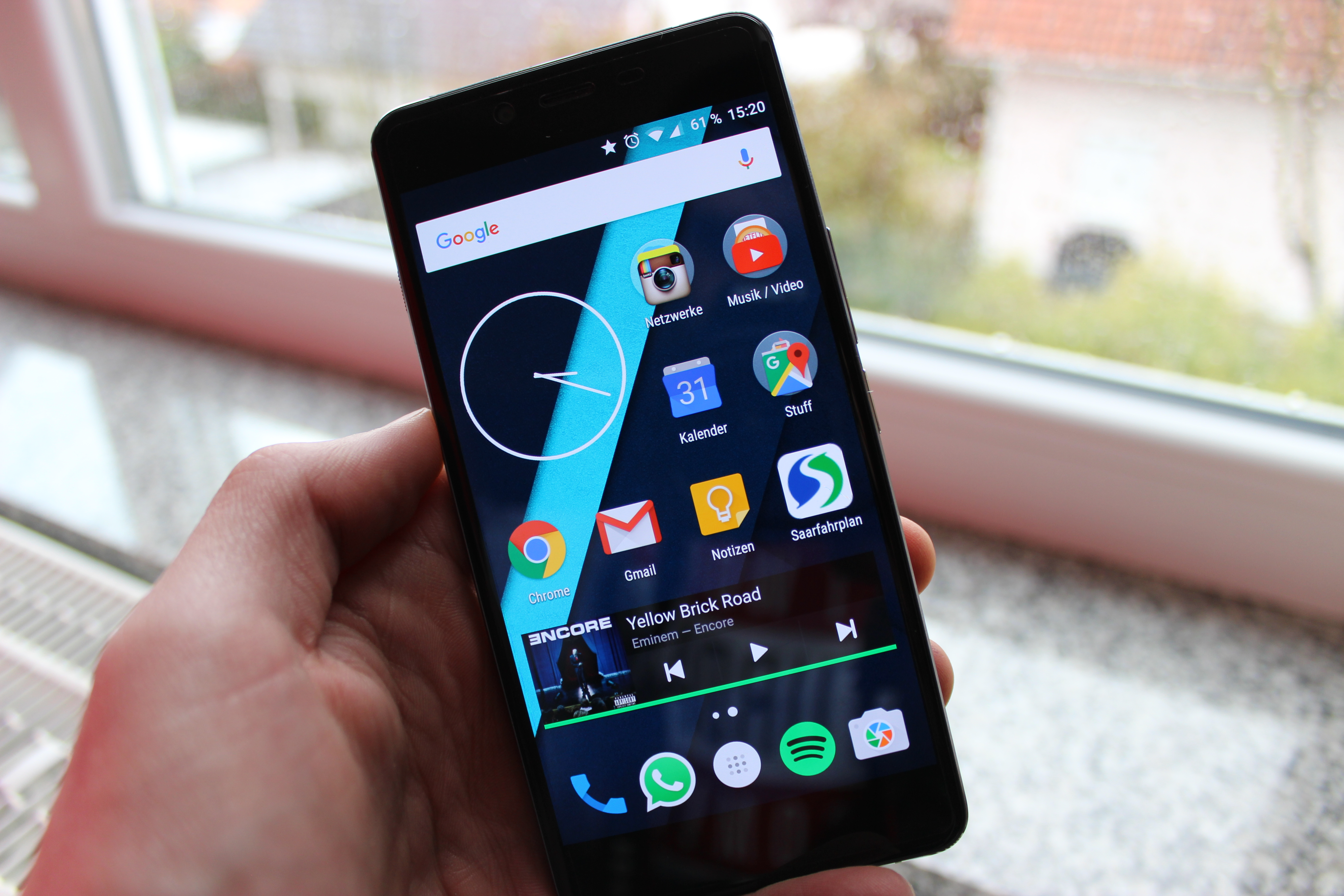
- Manufacturer: OnePlus
- Type: Smartphone
- First released: 29 October 2015; 11 years ago
- Availability by region: 5 November 2015 (EMEA release; Onyx only); 19 November 2015 (US & Can; Onyx Only); 24 November 2015 (EMEA release; Ceramic only)
- Discontinued: 15 June 2016
- Successor: OnePlus Nord (indirect)
- Related: OnePlus 2
- Form factor: Slate
- Dimensions: 140 mm (5.5 in) H 69 mm (2.7 in) W 6.9 mm (0.27 in) D
- Weight: 138 or 160 g (4.9 or 5.6 oz)
- Operating system: Android 5.1.1 "Lollipop": OxygenOS 2.2.2 (Global version); HydrogenOS (Chinese version); Current: Android 6.0.1 "Marshmallow": OxygenOS 3.1.4 (global version)
- System-on-chip: Qualcomm Snapdragon 801
- CPU: Quad-core 32-bit 28 nm • Quad-core 2.3 GHz Krait 400
- GPU: Adreno 330 578 MHz
- Memory: 3 GB LPDDR3 RAM
- Storage: 16 GB eMMC v5.0
- Removable storage: 2 removable nano-SIM card slots; 2nd SIM slot swappable with Micro SD up to 128 GB
- Battery: 2,525 mAh Li-Po
- Rear camera: 13 MP f/2.2 aperture, 1080p@30 fps (60 fps when low light), 720p@120 fps, phase autofocus, LED flash
- Front camera: 8 MP wide-angle lens, f/2.4 aperture
- Display: 5 in (130 mm) 1920 × 1080 pixel resolution (441 ppi); 1080p Full HD AMOLED
- Sound: Single mono speaker, 3.5 mm stereo audio jack
- Connectivity: All models: GSM/GPRS/EDGE: 850, 900, 1,800 and 1,900 MHz; Bands: 1/2/4/5/8; FDD-LTE: Bands: 1/2/4/5/7/8 Wi-Fi (802.11 b/g/n) (2.4 GHz), Wi-Fi Direct, Wi-Fi hotspot, DLNA, Bluetooth 4.0, A2DP, A-GPS, GLONASS & BDS, Micro USB, USB OTG, USB Host, 3.5 mm headphone jack
- Data inputs: List: Dual microphone with noise cancellation; 3-axis gyroscope; 3-axis accelerometer proximity sensor; Ambient light sensor; Multi-touch touchscreen display
- Model: E1001 (China); E1003 (EMEA and Asia); E1005 (North America)
- Codename: onyx
- Website: oneplus.net/x

The OnePlus X is an Android smartphone developed by OnePlus. It was released on 29 October 2015, three months after the release of the company's second flagship, the OnePlus 2 on 27 July. The OnePlus X's internals are similar to the OnePlus One.

The OnePlus X was available in three design options: Onyx (black), Champagne (white), and a limited edition Ceramic version. OnePlus has stated that the Ceramic OnePlus X will only be released in Europe with a limited run of only 10,000 units. The OnePlus X originally required an invitation to be purchased, but as of 28 January 2016, invitations are no longer necessary to purchase the device.

A China-only variant of the OnePlus X, the Oppo A30, was released in February 2016, four months after the OnePlus X's release.

== Development and launch ==
Shortly after the launch of the OnePlus 2, OnePlus co-founder Carl Pei hinted at the launch of a new device at the end of 2015 when interviewed at one of the popup events in New York City. After months of speculation by the media, the OnePlus X was officially unveiled on 29 October 2015. It was subsequently praised by reviewers and critics alike for its elegant looking design and high quality build. The Ceramic version of the phone features a ceramic back baked over a 25-day manufacturing process, which OnePlus claims was the first of its kind for a smartphone material.

Four days after the release of the phone, the company also released an extended warranty programme called On-Guard for users in Europe and India. It gives new OnePlus 2 and OnePlus X users coverage from device breakage, liquid damage, accidental damage, and vandalism among others. The On-Guard extended warranty can be purchased along with the device for an additional fee that entitles the user of the handset to free service and repairs for a period of either 12 or 24 months, depending on the warranty plan purchased.

== Release and distribution ==
=== Invitation system ===
As with all other OnePlus phones released thus far, the OnePlus X required an invitation to be purchased. Despite heavy criticism over the invitation system, OnePlus has claimed that it was necessary practice for the startup to manage product flow and prevent overstocks from occurring, hence the implementation of the system on all its phones.

=== Open sales ===
OnePlus has announced open sales for the OnePlus X after the initial month of sales that was strictly invitation based. Open sales will allow buyers to purchase the phone without an invitation, and will be held every week on specific dates of December that are yet to be announced by OnePlus. Open sales are also held in OnePlus' pop-up events in various cities held by company employees. The company was also keeping Open Sales events every Tuesday in India, while keeping invitation-system intact for rest of week days. Starting from 28 January 2016 it was completely invitation free.

== Specifications ==
=== Design and hardware ===
The design of the OnePlus X features a smooth glass back with textured aluminium bezels which provides a good grip on the frame of the phone. Both versions of the phone feature a dark glass back reminiscent of the glass back on the iPhone 4. The phone inherits the alert slider first found on the OnePlus 2 which toggles between All, Priority Only and No notifications. Due to the smaller form factor of the phone the internal battery was smaller compared to the OnePlus 2, coming in at 2,525 mAh compared to the latter's 3,300 mAh battery. The lower price of the phone also meant that the fingerprint sensor previously present on the OnePlus 2 has been omitted along with other features like optical image stabilization and swappable back covers. Oddly, the USB-C connector of the OnePlus 2 has not been carried over to the OnePlus X and the phone uses the micro USB instead of the newer USB-C connector. OnePlus has released textured back covers for the OnePlus X which resemble the styles of the swappable StyleSwap Covers for the OnePlus 2 with Bamboo, Rosewood, Black Apricot and Kevlar backs.

With a 5" AMOLED 1920 × 1080 Full HD resolution screen protected by Corning Gorilla Glass, the OnePlus X was a departure from both the OnePlus One and OnePlus 2 which featured a larger 5.5" LCD panel with the same resolution. Despite the smaller form factor, users still have the option of choosing between hardware capacitive buttons or on-screen customisable navigation "soft keys".

The OnePlus X was available in Onyx and Ceramic versions with each sporting different unique backs and a slightly different colour. Manufacturing the ceramic version requires a process which was 25 days long and the company has stated that it will have a limited run of only 10,000 units. The ceramic version was slightly heavier at 160 g (5.6 oz) and it will only be sold in Europe and India as announced by OnePlus. Despite being a design-centric device as advertised by OnePlus, the phone packs quite a punch with relatively powerful internal specs which was similar to last generation flagships like the OnePlus One and LG G3. The OnePlus X features 16 GB of internal storage with 3 GB LPDDR3 RAM and the handset was powered by the Qualcomm Snapdragon 801 32-bit quad-core chip clocked at 2.3 GHz with an Adreno 330 graphics processor.

Other features include FM radio and a dual SIM (nano SIM) card. This second card uses the micro SD storage card. As with the OnePlus 2, NFC was not available on the OnePlus X.

The OnePlus X has been tested on the AnTuTu Benchmark test and it yields a score of 45,000+ points, on par with similar devices powered by the Snapdragon 801 quad core processor.

Unlike the earlier OnePlus 2, since OnePlus X does not support any 700 MHz LTE frequency bands (namely, LTE Band 12 and 17, used by T-Mobile US and AT&T LTE networks, respectively), rural and indoor reception may be poor in the United States, especially in the case of T-Mobile US network, where LTE Band 12 was the only sub-1 GHz coverage option.

OnePlus X was also released in White (Champagne Edition) for other countries like India, after keeping it exclusive for home country China. Other than color difference, there isn't any difference in the device.

=== Software ===
The OnePlus X comes preloaded with Oxygen OS version 2.1.2, OnePlus's build of Android 5.1.1 "Lollipop".

On 4 August 2016, OnePlus began rolling out version 2.2.2 of Oxygen OS for OnePlus X. The update brings some bug fixes along with changes to camera UI and inclusion of Android's July security patch.

On 28 September 2016, OnePlus started rolling out version 2.2.3 of Oxygen OS for OnePlus X. The update comes with Android's September security patch and necessary dependencies for Android Marshmallow upgrade.

On 1 October 2016, OnePlus started rolling out version 3.1.3 of Oxygen OS for OnePlus X. The update comes with Android Marshmallow upgrade.
