= OnePlus Nord N100 =

Android-based smartphone manufactured by OnePlus

- Brand: OnePlus
- Manufacturer: OnePlus
- Successor: OnePlus Nord N200 5G
- Related: OnePlus Nord N10 5G
- Dimensions: 164.9 mm (6.49 in) H 75.1 mm (2.96 in) W 8.5 mm (0.33 in) D
- Weight: 188 g (6.6 oz)
- Operating system: OxygenOS 10.5 (based on Android 10)
- System-on-chip: Qualcomm Snapdragon 460 (11nm)
- CPU: Octa-core (4x1.8 GHz Kryo 240 & 4x1.6 GHz Kryo 240)
- GPU: Adreno 610
- Memory: 4 GB RAM
- Storage: 64 GB UFS 2.1
- Removable storage: microSD
- Battery: 5000 mAh
- Charging: 18 W fast-charging
- Rear camera: Triple: 13 MP f/2.2 wide, PDAF; 2 MP f/2.4 macro; 2 MP f/2.4 depth
- Front camera: 8 MP, f/2.0
- Display: 6.52 in (166 mm) (~82.9% screen-to-body ratio) 720 × 1600 IPS LCD, 20:9 ratio (~269 ppi density)
- Sound: Stereo speakers
- Data inputs: USB-C, 3.5mm audio jack: Fingerprint (rear-mounted); Accelerometer; Gyro; Proximity; Compass
- Codename: Clover
- Website: www.oneplus.com/n100

The OnePlus Nord N100 is an Android-based smartphone manufactured by OnePlus as part of their Nord series. The phone was announced on October 26, 2020, alongside the Nord N10 5G. It was available in North America from 15 January 2021.

== Specifications ==
=== Hardware ===
The OnePlus Nord N100 sports a 6.52 in (166 mm) 720 × 1600 (~269 ppi) display with a 20:9 aspect ratio. The front glass is Gorilla Glass 3 while the frame and back are constructed of plastic. The physical dimensions for the phone are 164.9 mm (6.49 in) X 75.1 mm (2.96 in) X 8.5 mm (0.33 in) and the weight is 188 g (6.6 oz). The phone is powered by the Qualcomm Snapdragon 460 (11nm) with an octa-core processor (4x1.8 GHz Kryo 240 & 4x1.6 GHz Kryo 240) paired with the Adreno 610 GPU. There is just one storage configuration available, which is 64 GB UFS 2.1 storage coupled with 4 GB RAM. Finally, it has a non-removable 5000 mAh battery capable of up to 18W Fast Charging. It also includes a rear-mounted fingerprint sensor.

==== Camera ====
The Nord N100 has three rear-facing cameras, arranged vertically in a black, rounded rectangle in the top left corner of the device. The camera array consists of a 13 MP (f/2.2) main sensor, a 2 MP (f/2.4) macro sensor, and a 2 MP (f/2.4) bokeh lens for portrait shots. The main camera can shoot up to 1080p video at 30fps and is flanked by an LED flash. The selfie camera is housed in a cutout in the top left corner of the display. The camera is an 8 MP (f/2.0) sensor which can be used for selfies and face unlock.

=== Software ===
The Nord N100 ships with OxygenOS 10.5, which is based on Android 10.

== See also ==
- OnePlus Nord N10
- OnePlus Nord
- OnePlus 8T
