= OnePlus 2 =

Android smartphone manufactured by OnePlus

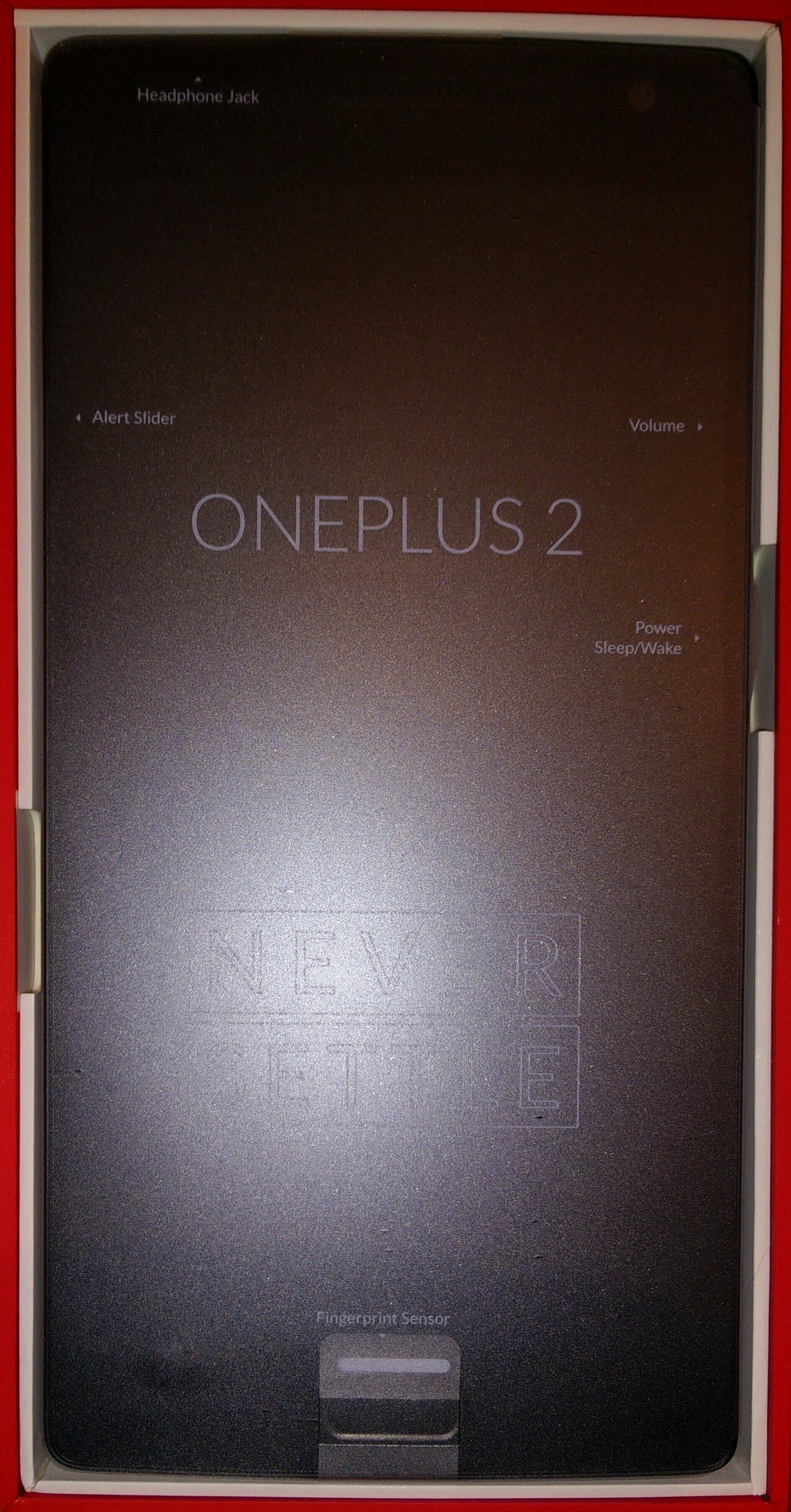
- Phone in packaging
- Manufacturer: OnePlus
- Type: Smartphone
- First released: 28 July 2015; 11 years ago
- Availability by region: August 11, 2015: China; Hong Kong; India; Canada; European Union; United States; September 22, 2015: Malaysia (via Maxis); Singapore (via Lazada SG); October 13, 2015: Israel; October 24, 2015: Saudi Arabia; United Arab Emirates
- Predecessor: OnePlus One
- Successor: OnePlus 3
- Related: OnePlus X
- Compatible networks: GSM, WCDMA, LTE
- Form factor: Slate
- Dimensions: 151.8 mm (5.98 in) H 74.9 mm (2.95 in) W 9.85 mm (0.388 in) D
- Weight: 175 g (6.2 oz)
- Operating system: Android based OxygenOS (global version) or HydrogenOS (Chinese version)
- System-on-chip: Qualcomm Snapdragon 810
- CPU: Octa-core 64-bit 20 nm • Quad-core 1.77 GHz Cortex-A57 • Quad-core 1.56 GHz Cortex A-53
- GPU: Adreno 430 630 MHz
- Memory: 3 or 4 GB LPDDR4 RAM
- Storage: 16 or 64 GB eMMC v5.0
- Removable storage: None; 2 removable nano-SIM card slots
- Battery: 3,300 mAh Li-Po
- Rear camera: 13 MP OmniVision Technologies PureCel-S™ OV13860 1.3 μm-pixel optical sensor, f/2.0 aperture, 2160p@30fps, 1080p@60fps, 720p@120fps, optical image stabilization, laser autofocus, dual LED flash
- Front camera: 5 MP OmniVision Technologies OV5648 1.4 μm-pixel optical sensor, wide-angle lens, 1080p@30fps, 720p@60fps
- Display: 5.5 in (140 mm) 1920 x 1080 pixel resolution (401 ppi); 1080p Full HD IPS LCD In-Cell
- Sound: Single mono speaker, 3.5 mm stereo audio jack
- Connectivity: All models: GSM/GPRS/EDGE: 850, 900, 1,800 and 1,900 MHz; Bands: 1/2/4/5/8; FDD-LTE: Bands: 1/2/4/5/7/8/12/17 Wi-Fi (802.11 a/b/g/n/ac) (2.4/5 GHz), Wi-Fi Direct, Wi-Fi hotspot, DLNA, Bluetooth 4.1, A2DP, A-GPS & GLONASS, USB-C, USB OTG, USB Host, 3.5 mm headphone jack
- Data inputs: List: Dual microphone with noise cancellation; 3-axis gyroscope; 3-axis accelerometer proximity sensor; Ambient light sensor; Multi-touch touchscreen display; Fingerprint reader; Compass
- Model: A2001 (China); A2003 (EMEA and Asia); A2005 (North America)
- Codename: oneplus2
- Website: oneplus.net/2

The OnePlus 2 (also abbreviated as OP2) is a smartphone designed by OnePlus. It is the successor to the OnePlus One. OnePlus revealed the phone on 28 July 2015 via virtual reality, using Google's Cardboard visor and its own app.

OnePlus sold out 30,000 units of the OnePlus 2 in China within 64 seconds after launching the product sale.

== Development ==
On 25 January 2015, OnePlus announced the smartphone's official name as OnePlus 2. It was also later reported that the OnePlus 2 would have a late 2015 release, possibly due to hardware issues with its processor.

In early April 2015, OnePlus confirmed that the OnePlus 2 would not feature wireless charging and NFC. On 29 June 2015, it was confirmed that the device would also feature a fingerprint sensor, which is similar to Apple's Touch ID.

In October 2015, OnePlus co-founder Carl Pei said that the OnePlus 2 will be the only flagship from the company for the year 2015, but another phone, called the OnePlus X, was released.

== Release and distribution ==
=== Invite system ===
OnePlus posted that it would use an invite system to handle sales of the OnePlus 2, exclusively through the company's website, like the OnePlus One. OnePlus claims that the invite system is more efficient than the invite system used for the sales of the OnePlus One, the OnePlus 2's predecessor. According to co-founder Carl Pei, there will be 30 to 50 times more invites from the start to match the greater demand for the OnePlus 2.

Within 72 hours of being launched, the OnePlus 2 had already accumulated over 1 million reservations. Within one week after being launched, the OnePlus 2 had accumulated over 2 million reservations. By September 2015, it had accumulated over 5 million reservations.

=== Open sales ===
In September, 2015, the OnePlus 2 became available in Israel without an invite, through its exclusive distributor, C-DATA. This came after buyers complained of buying the OnePlus 2 (without an invite) that came preloaded with malware.

On 12 October 2015, OnePlus held its first open-sale for 1 hour from 12-1 pm HKT/CEST/PDT exclusively to 32 countries via the company's website, with the exception of China, Malaysia, Indonesia, Israel and Singapore. This did not go flawlessly as the website's back-end could not handle the load. Due to this, the 1 hour sale was extended for another hour. In India, the sale ran for the entire day via sales partner Amazon.in.

A week later (on 19 October 2015), Malaysian carrier Maxis offered the OnePlus 2 invite-free for MYR 1788 ($420) exclusively via the Maxis Website.

== Specifications ==
=== Design and hardware ===
The OnePlus 2 has a revamped design meant to put it at the top with the rest of its flagship competitors. The handset incorporates an aluminum-magnesium alloy chassis, with the volume and power keys along with the new notifications control switch having a polished stainless steel accent and with the rear of the phone accompanied with a textured Sandstone Black plastic back cover. The user also have the choice to customize back covers with choices of Kevlar or assorted wood offerings including bamboo, black apricot and rosewood.

Compared to its predecessor the phone is 1 mm shrunken height and width-wise but 8% thicker and heavier due in part to its larger 3,300 mAh battery. The OnePlus 2 and its predecessor, the OnePlus One, have comparable displays, each 5.5" LCD 1920 x 1080 full HD resolution screens, with Corning Gorilla Glass protection. New to the OnePlus 2 is its fingerprint sensor which can optionally serve as a capacitive home button, along with back and multitasking navigation keys, but they can be disabled in favor of customizable navigation "soft keys" rendered on-screen.

There are two versions of the OnePlus 2. The White Basic version features 16 GB internal storage, and 3 GB LPDDR4 RAM. The Sandstone Black Premium version has 64 GB internal storage with 4 GB LPDDR4 RAM. The handset is powered by the Qualcomm Snapdragon 810 v2.1 64-bit octa-core chip purposefully underclocked to 1.8 GHz to avoid any overheating issues. The system on chip also includes an Adreno 430 graphics processor clocked at 630 MHz.

For its rear-facing camera, the OnePlus 2 utilizes an OmniVision OV13860 13-megapixel image sensor with features including a 1/2.6-inch sensor size, f/2.0 aperture, laser autofocus, optical image stabilization, dual tone LED flash, 4K and slow motion 720p video recording ability. Compared to its competitors the Samsung Galaxy S6 and LG G4 which both have 16-megapixel sensors, the smaller megapixel count of the OnePlus 2, "allows for individual pixels to be made bigger. Bigger pixels capture more light per pixel than smaller ones and this, in turn, reduces the amount of digital noise or 'grain' showing up in photos, especially in low light situations." The front-facing camera contains a wide-angle 5-megapixel camera.

Other features include a dual SIM (nano SIM) card layout with 4G LTE compatibility and the handset is the first smartphone with a worldwide release to feature a USB-C port. However, features left out with controversy include lack of NFC hardware and quick charge capabilities found on many other flagships and resulting in full charges that could exceed 3 hours according to OnePlus. OnePlus explained that NFC was not used by enough OnePlus One users for NFC to reasonably be added to the OnePlus 2.

Unlike the One Plus One, which shipped a single model worldwide, the 2 shipped different models per region (like most other manufacturers). As a consequence of this, 4G (LTE) connectivity may not be possible outside the region the phone was bought, due to different LTE standards.

The phone has an alert slider at the upper edge with 3 notification profiles : None, Priority and All.

=== Software ===
The OnePlus 2 comes preloaded with Android 5.1.1 "Lollipop" with OnePlus' OxygenOS version 2.0 on top of it. An update to OxygenOS version 2.2.1 was released for the OnePlus 2 in Feb 2016. In May 2016, OnePlus released an OTA update of Oxygen OS 3.0 with Android Marshmallow for its OnePlus 2 users.

Oneplus released an updated version of Oxygen OS (OOS3.5.5) on Christmas Eve, this update mainly covered VoLTE, gesture updates, enhanced UI and defect fixes. However, there were frequent network drop issues that led the Oneplus team to stop the OTA. The Oneplus Team quickly responded with fixing the defect and releasing the next version of Oxygen OS (OOS 3.5.6) that fixed all possible issues.

Despite telling consumers that the OnePlus 2 would be updated to Android 7 "Nougat", it was eventually confirmed that this was not to happen, leaving the device on the older Android 6.0.1.

OnePlus released OxygenOS 3.6.0 in July 2017, with included Android security patch level 1 June 2017 and small fixes.

It received an update OxygenOS 3.6.1 in October 2017, with included Android security patches, WPA2 security issues and general bug fixes & improvement.

Preceded by OnePlus One	OnePlus 2; 2015	Succeeded by OnePlus 3
