= OnePlus Nord 2 5G =

Android-based smartphone produced by OnePlus

- Brand: OnePlus
- Manufacturer: BBK Electronics
- Type: Phablet
- Series: Nord
- First released: 28 July 2021; 4 years ago
- Predecessor: OnePlus Nord
- Successor: OnePlus Nord 2T 5G
- Related: OnePlus 9
- Compatible networks: GSM bands: 850/900/1800/1900 MHz; CDMA bands: 800/1700/1900 MHz; UMTS bands: B1, B2, B4, B5, B8, B9, B19; CDMA2000 bands: 1×EVDO; LTE bands: 1-5/7/8/12/17-20/26/28/32/34/38-41/66; 5G bands: 1/3/5/7/8/20/28/38/40/41/66/77/78/79
- Form factor: Slate
- Dimensions: 158.9 mm × 73.2 mm × 8.3 mm (6.26 in × 2.88 in × 0.33 in)
- Weight: 189 g (6.7 oz)
- Operating system: Original: OxygenOS 11.3 based on Android 11; Current: OxygenOS 13 based on Android 13
- System-on-chip: MediaTek Dimensity 1200-AI
- CPU: Octa-core (1x 3.0 GHz Cortex-A78, 3x 2.6 GHz Cortex-A78, 4x 2.0 GHz Cortex-A55)
- GPU: Mali-G77 MC9
- Memory: 8 or 12 GB LPDDR4X RAM
- Storage: 128 or 256 GB UFS 3.1
- Removable storage: None
- Battery: 4500 mAh
- Charging: 65 W fast charging
- Rear camera: Sony Exmor IMX766 50 MP, ƒ/1.9, 24mm, 1/1.56", 1.0 μm (wide) + 8 MP, ƒ/2.3 (ultrawide) + 2 MP, ƒ/2.4 (monochrome) OIS, EIS, PDAF, dual-LED flash, Auto HDR, 4K@30 fps, 1080p@30/60/240 fps
- Front camera: Sony Exmor IMX615 32 MP, ƒ/2.5, 1/2.8", 0.8 μm (wide); 1080p@30 fps
- Display: Fluid AMOLED capacitive touchscreen 6.43 in (163 mm) 2400 × 1080 1080p, (409 ppi with 20:9 aspect ratio), 90 Hz refresh rate, Gorilla Glass 5, 16M colors, HDR10+/HLG, DCI-P3 support
- Sound: Stereo loudspeakers
- Connectivity: Bluetooth 5.2; Wi-Fi 802.11 a/b/g/n/ac/6; A2DP, LE, aptX HD
- Data inputs: Fingerprint scanner; Accelerometer; Gyroscope; Proximity sensor; Electronic compass
- Model: DN2101/DN2103
- Codename: Denniz
- Website: www.oneplus.com/uk/nord-2-5g

The OnePlus Nord 2 5G is an Android-based smartphone manufactured by OnePlus, unveiled on 22 July 2021. It succeeds the original Nord, and is the Second device in the Nord series.

== Specifications ==
=== Design ===
Like its predecessor, the One Plus Nord 2 5G has a plastic frame with a metallic finish and Gorilla Glass 5 protecting the screen and back panel. The power button and mute switch are located on the right side, while the volume key is located on the left side. The top has a secondary microphone, and the bottom has the primary microphone, USB-C port, loudspeaker, and dual-SIM card slot. The rear camera array is in the top corner, housing three sensors, and the dual-LED flash.

The device is available in Gray Sierra and Blue Haze, as well as Green-Wood which has artificial leather.

=== Hardware ===
==== Chipset ====
The OnePlus Nord 2 5G is powered by the MediaTek Dimensity 1200-AI processor with the Mali-G77 MC9 GPU. It has 128 or 256 GB of non-expandable UFS 3.1, and 8 or 12 GB of RAM.

==== Display ====
The One Plus Nord 2 5G has a 6.43-inch 1080p (2400 × 1080) AMOLED display with a 90 Hz refresh rate. There is a circular cutout at the top left corner for the front-facing camera, and an optical fingerprint scanner below the display. The display supports HDR and HDR10+, and has AI resolution boost and AI Color Boost video enhancement features.

==== Camera ====
The device has a triple camera setup on the rear, with a 50 MP Sony IMX766 wide sensor with PDAF and OIS, an 8 MP ultrawide sensor, and a 2 MP monochrome sensor. It can record video at a maximum of 4K at 30 fps, and also offers 1080p at 30, 60 or 240 fps. The front camera has a single 32 MP Sony IMX616 sensor, omitting the Nord's ultrawide lens.

==== Battery ====
The Nord 2 5G has a non-removable 4,500 mAh battery. It features Warp Charge 65, which is advertised as being capable of fully recharging the battery in 30 minutes, however it lacks support for wireless charging.

=== Software ===
The Nord 2 5G runs on OxygenOS 11.3, based on Android 11, and is upgradable to Android 13. OnePlus offers two years of Android updates and three years of security updates.
