= OnePlus Nord CE 3 Lite 5G =

2023 smartphone model

OnePlus Nord CE 3 Lite 5G OnePlus Nord N30 5G Oppo K11x
- Developer: OnePlus; OPPO Electronics
- Manufacturer: OPPO Electronics
- Type: Phablet
- Series: OnePlus Nord / Oppo K
- First released: Nord CE 3 Lite: April 4, 2023; 3 years ago Oppo K11x: May 25, 2023; 3 years ago Nord N30: June 6, 2023; 3 years ago
- Availability by region: Nord CE 3 Lite: Worldwide; Oppo K11x: China; Nord N30: United States
- Predecessor: OnePlus Nord CE 2 Lite 5G; OnePlus Nord N20 5G
- Successor: OnePlus Nord CE4 Lite
- Related: OnePlus Nord 3 5G; OnePlus Nord CE 3 5G; OnePlus Nord N300 5G
- Compatible networks: GSM, 3G, 4G (LTE), 5G
- Form factor: Slate
- Colors: Nord CE 3 Lite: Pastel Lime, Chromatic Gray; Nord N30: Chromatic Gray; Oppo K11x: Jade Black, Pearl
- Dimensions: 165.5×76×8.3 mm (6.52×2.99×0.33 in)
- Weight: 195 g (7 oz)
- Operating system: Nord CE 3 Lite/N30: Initial: Android 13 + OxygenOS 13.1; Current: Android 14 + OxygenOS 14.1; Oppo K11x: Initial: Android 13 + ColorOS 13.1; Current: Android 14 + ColorOS 14.1
- System-on-chip: Snapdragon 695 (6 nm)
- CPU: Octa-core (2×2.2 GHz Kryo 660 Gold & 6×1.7 GHz Kryo 660 Silver)
- GPU: Adreno 619
- Memory: Nord CE 3 Lite/N30: 8 GB; Oppo K11x: 8/12 GB; LPDDR4X
- Storage: Nord CE 3 Lite/Oppo K11x: 128/256 GB; Nord N30: 128 GB; UFS 2.2
- Removable storage: MicroSDXC up to 1 TB
- SIM: Hybrid Dual SIM (Nano-SIM)
- Battery: Non-removable, Li-Po 5000 mAh
- Charging: Nord CE 3 Lite/Oppo K11x: 67W fast charging Nord N30: 50W fast charging
- Rear camera: Wide: All models: 108 MP, 24 mm, 1/1.67", 0.64µm, PDAF; Nord CE 3 Lite/Oppo K11x: f/1.8; Nord N30: f/1.7; Macro: Nord CE 3 Lite/N30: 2 MP, f/2.4; Oppo K11x: N/A; Depth sensor: 2 MP, f/2.4; Other: LED flash, HDR, panorama; Video: 1080p@30fps
- Front camera: 16 MP, f/2.4 (wide), 1.0 µm HDR, panorama Video: 1080p@30fps
- Display: IPS LCD, 6.72", 2400 × 1080 (1080p), 391 ppi, 20:9, 120 Hz
- Sound: Stereo speakers 3.5 mm audio jack
- Connectivity: USB-C 2.0, Bluetooth 5.1 (A2DP, LE, aptX HD), NFC (except Oppo K11x), Wi-Fi 802.11 a/b/g/n/ac (dual-band, Wi-Fi Direct, hotspot), GPS, GLONASS, BeiDou, Galileo, QZSS
- Other: Fingerprint scanner (side-mounted), proximity sensor, accelerometer, gyroscope, compass
- Website: Official website for OnePlus Nord CE 3 Lite 5G; Official website for OnePlus Nord N30 5G; Official Chinese website for Oppo K11x

The OnePlus Nord CE 3 Lite 5G is a mid-range smartphone developed and manufactured by OnePlus as part of the Nord CE series, serving as a low-end version of the OnePlus Nord CE 3 5G. It was announced on April 4, 2023.

== Variants ==
In the United States, the smartphone is sold as the OnePlus Nord N30 5G, featuring lower charging speeds and limited color and memory options.

In China, the device is marketed as the Oppo K11x, which is identical to the OnePlus Nord CE 3 Lite 5G but with different color variants and the omission of the macro camera.

== Design ==
The display is made of glass, while the back panel and side frames are constructed from plastic.

The bottom of the device houses a USB-C port, speaker, microphone, and a 3.5 mm audio jack. The top features a secondary microphone. The volume buttons and a hybrid slot for two SIM cards (or one SIM card and a microSD card up to 1 TB) are located on the left side. The right side contains the power button, which doubles as a fingerprint scanner.

The color options may differ for the following models:

- The OnePlus Nord CE 3 Lite 5G is available in Pastel Lime and Chromatic Gray.
- The OnePlus Nord N30 5G is sold exclusively in Chromatic Gray.
- The Oppo K11x is available in Jade Black and Pearl.

== Technical specifications ==
=== Hardware ===
The smartphones are powered by the Snapdragon 695 processor and the Adreno 619 GPU.

=== Battery ===
The devices feature a 5000 mAh battery. The OnePlus Nord CE 3 Lite 5G and Oppo K11x support 67W fast charging, while the OnePlus Nord N30 5G supports 50W.

=== Camera ===
The OnePlus Nord CE 3 Lite 5G and Nord N30 5G feature a triple rear camera setup with a 108 MP (f/1.8 on Nord CE 3 Lite; f/1.7 on Nord N30) wide with PDAF, a 2 MP f/2.4 (macro) and 2 MP f/2.4 (depth sensor).

The Oppo K11x features a dual camera setup with 108 MP f/1.8 (wide) with PDAF and a 2 MP f/2.4 (depth sensor).

All models are equipped with a 16 MP f/2.4 (wide) front camera. Both the rear and front cameras are capable of recording 1080p video at 30fps.

=== Display ===
The display is a 6.72" IPS LCD with FullHD+ resolution (2400 × 1080), a pixel density of 391 ppi, a 20:9 aspect ratio, and a 120 Hz refresh rate. It features a centered punch-hole cutout for the front camera.

=== Audio ===
The smartphones feature stereo speakers, with the earpiece doubling as the second speaker.

=== Memory ===
- The OnePlus Nord CE 3 Lite 5G is available in 8/128 GB and 8/256 GB configurations.
- The OnePlus Nord N30 5G is available in an 8/128 GB configuration.
- The Oppo K11x is available in 8/128 GB, 8/256 GB, and 12/256 GB configurations.

=== Software ===
The OnePlus Nord CE 3 Lite 5G and Nord N30 5G were launched with OxygenOS 13.1, while the Oppo K11x launched with ColorOS 13.1, both based on Android 13. They were later updated to OxygenOS 14.1 and ColorOS 14.1 respectively, based on Android 14.
