= OnePlus Nord 3 5G =

2023 Android mid-range smartphone

OnePlus Nord 3 5G OnePlus Ace 2V
- Developer: OnePlus
- Manufacturer: Oppo
- Type: Phablet
- Series: Nord / Ace
- First released: Nord 3: July 5, 2023; 2 years ago Ace 2V: March 7, 2023; 3 years ago
- Availability by region: Nord 3: Worldwide; Ace 2V: China
- Predecessor: OnePlus Nord 2T
- Successor: OnePlus Nord 4 OnePlus Ace 3V
- Related: OnePlus Nord CE 3 5G; OnePlus Nord CE 3 Lite 5G; OnePlus 11R (OnePlus Ace 2); OnePlus Ace 2 Pro
- Compatible networks: GSM, 3G, 4G LTE, 5G
- Form factor: Slate
- Colors: Nord 3: Misty Green, Tempest Gray; Ace 2V: Green Glaze, Black Rock
- Dimensions: 162.6×75.1×8.15 mm (6.402×2.957×0.321 in)
- Weight: Nord 3: 191.5 g Ace 2V: 193.5 g
- Operating system: Nord 3: Initial: Android 13 with OxygenOS 13.1; Current: Android 16 with OxygenOS 16; Ace 2V: Initial: Android 13 with ColorOS 13; Current: Android 16 with ColorOS 16
- System-on-chip: MediaTek Dimensity 9000 (4 nm)
- CPU: Octa-core (1×3.05 GHz Cortex-X2 & 3×2.85 GHz Cortex-A710 & 4×1.80 GHz Cortex-A510)
- GPU: Mali-G710 MC10
- Memory: Nord 3: 8 or 16 GB; Ace 2V: 12 or 16 GB; LPDDR5X
- Storage: Nord 3: 128 or 256 GB; Ace 2V: 256 or 512 GB, 1 TB; UFS 3.1
- SIM: Dual SIM (Nano-SIM)
- Battery: Non-removable Li-Po 5000 mAh
- Charging: 80W wired SUPERVOOC
- Rear camera: Wide: Nord 3: 50 MP Sony IMX890, f/1.8, 24 mm, 1/1.56", 1 µm, multi-directional PDAF, OIS; Ace 2V: 64 MP, f/1.7, 25 mm, 81°, PDAF, OIS; Ultrawide: 8 MP, f/2.2, 16 mm, 112°, 1/4", 1.12 µm Macro: 2 MP, f/2.4 Features: LED flash, HDR, panorama Video: 4K@30/60fps, 1080p@30/60/120fps, gyro-EIS
- Front camera: Nord 3: 16 MP, f/2.4, 24 mm (wide), 1 µm Ace 2V: 16 MP, f/2.4, 26 mm (wide), 1 µm Features: HDR, panorama Video: 1080p@30fps, gyro-EIS
- Display: AMOLED, 120 Hz, 6.74 in, 2772 × 1240 pixels, 20:9 ratio, 451 ppi
- Sound: Stereo speakers
- Connectivity: USB-C 2.0, Bluetooth 5.2 (Nord 3) / 5.3 (Ace 2V) (A2DP, LE, aptX HD), NFC, Infrared port, Wi-Fi 6 (dual-band, Wi-Fi Direct), GPS (L1+L5), GLONASS (G1), BeiDou (B1I+B1c+B2a), Galileo (E1+E5a), QZSS (L1+L5)
- Model: Nord 3: CPH2491, CPH2493; Ace 2V: PHP110
- Website: Official website of OnePlus Nord 3 5G; Official website of OnePlus Ace 2V

The OnePlus Nord 3 5G is a mid-range smartphone developed by OnePlus as part of its Nord series. It was unveiled on July 5, 2023, alongside the OnePlus Nord CE 3 5G.

In China, the phone is marketed as the OnePlus Ace 2V with the primary configuration difference being the rear camera sensors.

== Design ==
The front panel is constructed from Asahi Dragontrail Glass, while the back glass panel utilizes Corning Gorilla Glass 5. The structural frame is made of polycarbonate plastic.

The aesthetic layout closely mimics the design language found on the OnePlus Nord CE 3 5G and OnePlus Nord CE 3 Lite 5G. The chassis features an IP54 rating for splash and dust resistance.

The bottom edge houses a USB-C interface port, main loudspeaker, microphone, and a dual Nano-SIM card tray slot. The top edge includes a secondary noise-canceling microphone, secondary speaker outlet, and an infrared blaster. Volume buttons are positioned on the left side, while the right side houses the signature Alert Slider physical toggle alongside the power/lock key.

The hardware configurations were distributed in the following color treatments:

Color	Marketing Name	
Color	OnePlus Nord 3 5G	OnePlus Ace 2V
	Misty Green	Green Glaze
	Tempest Gray	Black Rock

== Specifications ==
=== Hardware and platform ===
Both devices run on the MediaTek Dimensity 9000 system-on-chip platform built on a 4 nm node process, paired with a Mali-G710 MC10 graphics processing unit.

=== Battery ===
The internal power system utilizes a non-removable 5000 mAh cell capacity. It supports proprietary 80W wired SUPERVOOC fast charging standards.

=== Camera ===
The main rear array features a triple-camera assembly. On the OnePlus Nord 3 5G, this consists of a 50 MP Sony IMX890 wide-angle lens with an aperture of f/1.8, multi-directional phase-detection autofocus (PDAF), and optical image stabilization (OIS). The OnePlus Ace 2V swaps this for a 64 MP wide-angle lens with an aperture of f/1.7, PDAF, and OIS.

Both variants share an identical 8 MP ultrawide lens with an aperture of f/2.2 and a 112° field of view, alongside a 2 MP macro lens with an aperture of f/2.4. The front-facing selfie assembly features a 16 MP wide-angle lens with an aperture of f/2.4.

The rear system is capable of video capture up to 4K at 60 frames per second (fps), while the front sensor handles up to 1080p at 30 fps with gyro-assisted EIS.

=== Display ===
The display features a 6.74-inch AMOLED panel delivering a native resolution of 2772 × 1240 pixels at a pixel density of roughly 451 ppi. It operates at an adaptive 120 Hz refresh rate using a 20:9 aspect ratio configuration with a centered punch-hole cutout for the secondary camera assembly.

=== Audio ===
Acoustic performance is delivered via dedicated stereo speakers located on the upper and lower edges of the device chassis.

=== Memory and storage ===
The OnePlus Nord 3 5G was available in 8 GB RAM / 128 GB storage and 16 GB RAM / 256 GB storage tiers. The Ace 2V variant offered expanded tiers including 12 GB/256 GB, 16 GB/256 GB, 16 GB/512 GB, and 16 GB/1 TB options. Both configurations leverage high-performance LPDDR5X RAM paired with integrated UFS 3.1 flash storage architectures.

=== Software ===
The OnePlus Nord 3 5G shipped with OxygenOS 13.1 out of the box, whereas the regional Ace 2V device loaded with ColorOS 13, both software skins running over an underlying Android 13 base operating system layer. The Nord 3 5G was subsequently updated to OxygenOS 16, and the Ace 2V to ColorOS 16, both operating under an Android 16 environment.
