= OnePlus Nord CE4 =

2024 5G Smartphone

OnePlus Nord CE4 (CPH2613) Oppo K12 (PJR110)
- Brand: OnePlus; OPPO Electronics
- Manufacturer: OPPO Electronics
- Type: Phablet
- Series: OnePlus Nord / Oppo K
- First released: Nord CE4: April 1, 2024; 2 years ago Oppo K12: April 24, 2024; 2 years ago
- Availability by region: Nord CE4: India; Oppo K12: China
- Predecessor: OnePlus Nord CE 3 5G
- Successor: OnePlus Nord CE5
- Related: OnePlus Nord 4 OnePlus Nord CE4 Lite
- Compatible networks: GSM, 3G, 4G, LTE, 5G
- Form factor: Slate
- Colors: Nord CE4: Celadon Marble, Dark Chrome; Oppo K12: Starry Night, Green Cloud
- Dimensions: 162.5×75.3×8.37 mm (6.398×2.965×0.330 in)
- Weight: 186 g (7 oz)
- Operating system: Nord CE4: Android 14 with OxygenOS 14; Oppo K12: Android 14 with ColorOS 14
- System-on-chip: Qualcomm Snapdragon 7 Gen 3 (4 nm)
- CPU: Octa-core (1× 2.63 GHz Cortex-A715 & 4× 2.4 GHz Cortex-A715 & 3× 1.8 GHz Cortex-A510)
- GPU: Adreno 720
- Memory: Nord CE4: 8 GB; Oppo K12: 8/12 GB; LPDDR4X
- Storage: Nord CE4: 128/256 GB; Oppo K12: 256/512 GB; UFS 3.1
- Removable storage: microSDXC up to 1 TB (uses shared SIM slot)
- SIM: Hybrid Dual SIM (Nano-SIM)
- Battery: Non-removable, Li-Po 5500 mAh
- Charging: 100W wired, SUPERVOOC
- Rear camera: 50 MP, f/1.8, 26mm (wide), 1/1.95", 0.8µm, PDAF, OIS + 8 MP, f/2.2, 16mm, 112° (ultrawide), 1/4", 1.12µm Dual-LED flash, HDR, panorama Video: 4K@30fps, 1080p@30/60/120fps, gyro-EIS
- Front camera: 16 MP, f/2.4, 26mm (wide), 1/3", 1µm Panorama; Video: 1080p@30fps
- Display: AMOLED, 6.7", 2412 × 1080 (Full HD+), 394 ppi, 20:9 ratio, 120 Hz, HDR10+
- Sound: Stereo speakers
- Connectivity: USB-C 2.0, Bluetooth 5.4 (A2DP, LE, aptX HD, LHDC), NFC (Oppo K12 only), IR blaster, Wi-Fi 6 (802.11 a/b/g/n/ac/ax), GPS, GLONASS, BeiDou, Galileo, QZSS
- Water resistance: IP54
- Other: Fingerprint (under display, optical), proximity, accelerometer, gyroscope, compass
- Website: Official website (OnePlus Nord CE4); Official Chinese website (Oppo K12)

The OnePlus Nord CE4 is a mid-range Android smartphone developed by OnePlus as part of the Nord series. It was announced on April 1, 2024. In China, the smartphone was introduced on April 24, 2024, as the Oppo K12, featuring larger internal storage configurations and NFC support.

== Specifications ==
=== Design & appearance ===
The screen is made of glass, while the back panel and frame are made of plastic.

The design of the smartphones is similar to the OnePlus Ace 3V.

The bottom features a USB-C port, speaker, microphone, and a hybrid slot for two SIM cards or one SIM card and a microSD card up to 1 TB. On top, there is a second microphone, a second speaker, and an IR blaster. The volume buttons and power button are located on the right side.

The OnePlus Nord CE4 is sold in Celadon Marble and Dark Chrome colors. On the Oppo K12, these colors are branded as Green Cloud and Starry Night, respectively.

=== Hardware ===
The smartphones are powered by the Qualcomm Snapdragon 7 Gen 3 processor and Adreno 720 GPU, with an octa-core composed with one Cortex-A715 core clocking at 2.63 GHz, four Cortex-A715 cores clocking at 2.4 GHz, and three Cortex-A510 cores clocking at 1.8 GHz.

The devices feature a 5500 mAh battery with support for 100W SUPERVOOC fast charging.

Both phones were installed with a 6.7-inch AMOLED panel with Full HD+ resolution (2412 × 1080), 394 ppi pixel density, a 20:9 aspect ratio, and a 120 Hz refresh rate. It supports HDR10+ and features a centered punch-hole cutout for the front camera.

The smartphones feature stereo speakers located at the top and bottom edges of the device.

The OnePlus Nord CE4 is available in 8/128 GB and 8/256 GB configurations, while the Oppo K12 comes in 8/256 GB, 12/256 GB, and 12/512 GB variants.

=== Cameras ===
The devices are equipped with a dual rear camera setup:

- 50 MP, f/1.8 (wide) main sensor with phase detection autofocus and optical image stabilization,
- 8 MP, f/2.2 (ultrawide) sensor with a 112° field of view

The front camera is a 16 MP, f/2.4 (wide) sensor. The main camera supports video recording up to 4K@30fps, while the front camera records at 1080p@30fps.

=== Software ===
The OnePlus Nord CE4 is pre-installed with OxygenOS 14, while the Oppo K12 is pre-installed with ColorOS 14. Both user interfaces are installed on Android 14.
