= OnePlus Nord CE4 Lite =

2024 Android smartphones developed by OnePlus & Oppo

OnePlus Nord CE4 Lite Oppo K12x
- Brand: OnePlus; OPPO
- Manufacturer: OPPO Electronics
- Type: Phablet
- Series: OnePlus Nord/Oppo K
- First released: Oppo K12x: March 14, 2024; 2 years ago Nord CE4 Lite: June 24, 2024; 2 years ago
- Availability by region: Nord CE4 Lite: Worldwide; Oppo K12x: China
- Predecessor: OnePlus Nord CE 3 Lite 5G
- Related: OnePlus Nord 4 OnePlus Nord CE4
- Compatible networks: GSM, 3G, 4G (LTE), 5G
- Form factor: Slate
- Colors: Nord CE4 Lite: Mega Blue, Ultra Orange, Super Silver; Oppo K12x: Condensed Green, Titanium Air Grey
- Dimensions: 162.9×75.6×8.1 mm (6.41×2.98×0.32 in)
- Weight: 191 g (7 oz)
- Operating system: Nord CE4 Lite: Original: Android 14 + OxygenOS 14; Oppo K12x: Original: Android 14 + ColorOS 14
- System-on-chip: Qualcomm SM6375 Snapdragon 695 (6 nm)
- CPU: Octa-core (2×2.2 GHz Kryo 660 Gold & 6×1.7 GHz Kryo 660 Silver)
- GPU: Adreno 619
- Memory: Nord CE4 Lite: 8 GB; Oppo K12x: 8/12 GB; LPDDR4X
- Storage: Nord CE4 Lite: 128/256 GB; Oppo K12x: 256/512 GB; UFS 2.2
- Removable storage: MicroSDXC up to 2 TB
- SIM: Hybrid Dual SIM (Nano-SIM)
- Battery: Non-removable, Li-Po; Nord CE4 Lite: 5110 mAh; Nord CE4 Lite (India)/Oppo K12x: 5500 mAh
- Charging: 80 W fast charging Power Delivery 3.0; 5 W reverse wired charging
- Rear camera: Wide: Nord CE4 Lite: 50 MP Sony LYT-600, f/1.8, 25 mm, 1/1.95", 0.8 μm, PDAF, OIS; Oppo K12x: 50 MP, f/1.8, 1/2.76", 0.8 μm, PDAF; Depth sensor: 2 MP, f/2.4; Other: Dual-LED flash, HDR, panorama; Video: 1080p@30fps, gyro-EIS
- Front camera: 16 MP, f/2.4, 24 mm (wide); HDR, panorama Video: 1080p@30fps, gyro-EIS
- Display: AMOLED, 6.67", 2400 × 1080 (FullHD+), 395 ppi, 20:9, 120 Hz
- Sound: Stereo speakers
- Connectivity: USB-C 2.0, 3.5 mm audio jack, Bluetooth 5.1 (A2DP, LE, aptX HD), NFC (Nord CE4 Lite (CPH2621)), Wi-Fi 802.11 a/b/g/n/ac (dual-band), GPS, A-GPS, GLONASS, BeiDou, Galileo, QZSS
- Codename: Nord CE4 Lite: camry Oppo K12x: avatar-m
- Other: Fingerprint scanner (under display, optical), proximity sensor, accelerometer, gyroscope, compass
- Website: OnePlus Nord CE4 Lite Official Website; Oppo K12x Official Chinese Website

The OnePlus Nord CE4 Lite (models CPH2619 and CPH262; PJT110 for Oppo K12x) is a mid-range Android smartphone developed by OnePlus, part of the Nord series, and is a simplified version of the OnePlus Nord CE4. The smartphone is divided into an Indian model (CPH2619) and an international model (CPH2621), which differ in battery capacity and the presence of a NFC chip.

In China, the Indian model of the OnePlus Nord CE4 Lite was introduced as the Oppo K12x, with differences in the main camera, color options, and more memory configurations.

== Design ==
The One Plus Nord CE4 Lite and K12x have a plastic back and frame similar to their predecessors.

At the bottom, there's a USB-C port, a speaker, a microphone, and a 3.5 mm audio jack, while a second speaker is located at the top. On the left side, there's a hybrid slot for either two SIM cards or one SIM card and a microSD memory card up to 2 TB. On the right side, are the volume buttons and the power button.

Smartphones are available in the following colors:

| OnePlus Nord CE4 Lite | | | | Oppo K12x | |
| Global | | India | | Oppo K12x | |
| Color | Name | Color | Name | Color | Name |
|---|---|---|---|---|---|
| | Super Silver | | Super Silver | | Titanium Air Grey |
| | Mega Blue | | Mega Blue | | Condensed Green |
| | | | Ultra Orange | | |

== Technical specifications ==
=== Processor ===
The smartphones, like the predecessors, feature a Qualcomm Snapdragon 695 processor with an Adreno 619 GPU.

=== Battery ===
The international model of the OnePlus Nord CE4 Lite has a 5110 mAh battery, while the Indian model of the OnePlus Nord CE4 Lite and the Oppo K12x have a 5500 mAh battery. All models support 80 W fast charging and 5 W reverse wired charging. Additionally, in certain markets, the OnePlus Nord CE4 Lite ships without a charger.

=== Camera ===
==== Rear camera ====
The smartphones feature a dual main camera with a wide-angle lens: a 50 MP Sony LYT-600 with optical image stabilization and an aperture of f/1.8 on the OnePlus Nord CE4 Lite, or an unknown manufacturer's 50 MP sensor with an f/1.8 aperture on the Oppo K12x. Both models also include a 2 MP depth sensor with an aperture of f/2.4.

==== Front camera ====
All models come with a 16 MP wide-angle front camera with an f/2.4 aperture. Both the main and front cameras can record video at 1080p@30fps.

=== Display ===
The phone's display is a 6.67" AMOLED Full HD+ (2400 × 1080) with a pixel density of 395 ppi, a 20:9 aspect ratio, a 120 Hz refresh rate, and a circular cutout for the front camera located at the top center. An optical in-display fingerprint scanner is also integrated.

=== Audio ===
The smartphones feature two multimedia speakers, located on the top and bottom edges, forming a stereo pair.

=== Storage ===
The OnePlus Nord CE4 Lite is only available in an 8/256 GB configuration in the international market, while in India, it is also available in an 8/128 GB configuration. The Oppo K12x, meanwhile, is available in 8/256 GB, 12/256 GB, and 12/512 GB configurations.

=== Software ===
The OnePlus Nord CE4 Lite was released with OxygenOS 14, and the Oppo K12x with ColorOS 14. Both user interfaces are based on Android 14.
