= OnePlus One =

Android Smartphone

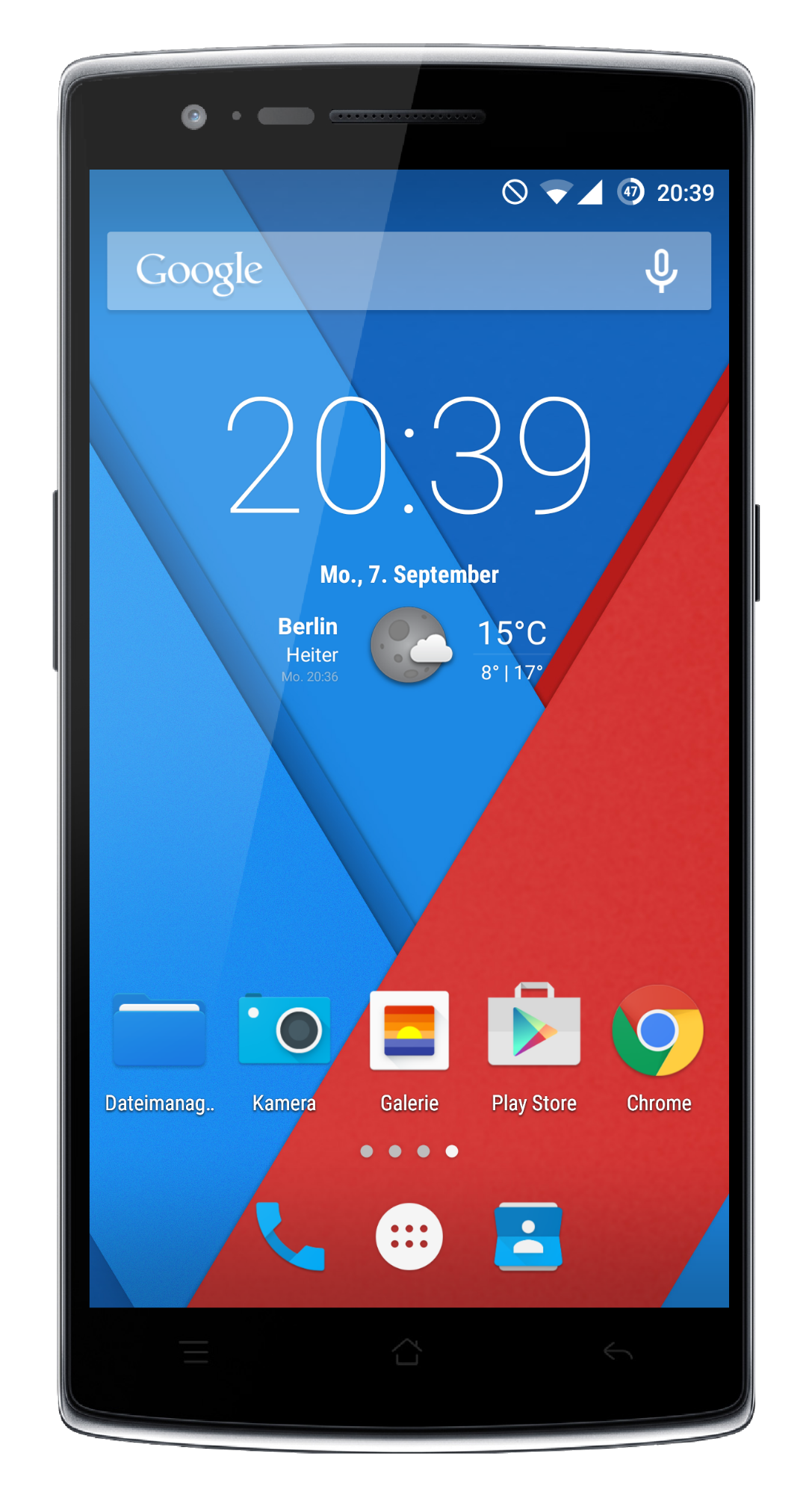
- The front face view of the OnePlus One ("Sandstone Black", 64 GB) running Cyanogen OS 12
- Brand: OnePlus
- Manufacturer: OnePlus
- Type: Phablet
- First released: 23 April 2014; 12 years ago
- Availability by region: 25 April 2014 (Invite-only release); 6 June 2014 (Worldwide release); 2 December 2014 (India)
- Discontinued: 26 April 2016
- Successor: OnePlus 2
- Compatible networks: GSM, WCDMA, LTE
- Form factor: Slate
- Dimensions: 152.9 mm (6.02 in) H 75.9 mm (2.99 in) W 8.9 mm (0.35 in) D
- Weight: 162 g (5.7 oz)
- Operating system: Original: Android 4.4.2 "KitKat": CyanogenMod 11S (global version); Android 4.3 "Jelly Bean": ColorOS (Chinese version); Current: Android 5.1.1 "Lollipop": OxygenOS 2.1.4 (global version); Android 6.0.1 "Marshmallow": HydrogenOS 2.0 (Chinese version); Unofficial: Android 11: LineageOS 18.1
- System-on-chip: Qualcomm Snapdragon 801 MSM8974PRO-AC r2p1
- CPU: 2.5 GHz (2457 MHz) quad-core Krait 400
- GPU: Adreno 330, 578 MHz
- Memory: 3 GB 1866 MHz LPDDR3 RAM
- Storage: 16 GB (Silk White), 64 GB (Sandstone Black)
- Removable storage: None; Removable SIM card slot
- Battery: Non-removable 3100 mAh Li-Po
- Rear camera: Sony Exmor RS IMX214 13 megapixels (4128×3096 px), autofocus, dual-LED flash, DCI 4K@24fps (native support, OpenCamera lets you do 30fps @ 100 Mbps) 2160p@30fps, 1080p@60fps, 720p@120fps, HDR
- Front camera: 5 megapixels, 1080p@30fps (extra-wide 80º viewing angle)
- Display: 5.46 in (139 mm) 1920x1080 pixel resolution, 401 ppi pixel density, 800:1 contrast ratio (typical); LED-backlit IPS capacitive touchscreen, 16:9 aspect ratio, 600 cd/m2 max brightness (typical), and oleophobic coating
- Sound: Dual mono speakers, 3.5 mm stereo audio jack
- Connectivity: GSM/GPRS/EDGE: 850, 900, 1800 and 1900 MHz; Bands: 1/2/4/5/8; 3G (HSDPA 42 Mbit/s, HSUPA 5.8 Mbit/s): 850, 900, 1700, 1900 and 2100 MHz; LTE: 700, 1700, 1800, 2100, 2300 and 2600 MHz; Bands: 1/3/4/7/17/38/40; Wi-Fi (802.11 a/b/g/n/ac) (2.4/5 GHz), Wi-Fi Direct, Wi-Fi hotspot, DLNA, Bluetooth 4.0, A2DP, NFC, A-GPS & GLONASS, microUSB 2.0, USB OTG, USB Host, 3.5 mm headphone jack
- Data inputs: Multi-touch touchscreen display, triple microphone configuration, 3-axis gyroscope, 3-axis accelerometer, digital compass, proximity sensor, ambient light sensor
- Model: A0001
- Codename: Bacon
- SAR: US 0.62 W/kg (head) 0.75 W/kg (body)
- Website: oneplus.net/one

The OnePlus One (colloquially abbreviated to OPO and also known as OnePlus 1) is an Android smartphone manufactured by OnePlus. Unveiled in April 2014, it is the first product by OnePlus. The OnePlus One was designed to compare favorably – in performance, quality, and price – to flagship devices by leading smartphone manufacturers. It was also intended to be developer friendly, and has since received a wide variety of ROMs and custom kernels from the community. The OnePlus One shipped to most markets with the Cyanogen OS operating system pre-installed, a commercial variant of CyanogenMod.

The phone was first made available for sale on 25 April 2014, exclusively from the OnePlus website, but initially required prospective customers to obtain an invitation before they could purchase it. These invitations were primarily distributed by the company through contests, some of which attracted attention for their unconventional or controversial nature. On 6 June 2014, the device was available for general sale. As of 20 April 2015, the device no longer required an invite to purchase.

== Development ==
The OnePlus company was founded on 16 December 2013 by former Oppo vice-president Pete Lau. The company's main goal was to design his "dream" smartphone; one that would balance the quality of high-end devices from its major competitors with a lower price than other phones in its class. He argued that, despite their lower cost, users would "never settle" for the lower-quality devices produced by other Chinese companies, and similar startups such as Blu and Yota. Lau compared the ideals of OnePlus with those of the Japanese company Muji, with a focus on high quality products with simplistic designs. The company's primary cost-cutting measure was a decision to exclusively sell the device online, rather than at retail or through wireless carriers, citing the success of a similar online sales model for Nexus devices. Continuing Lau's association with the platform from the Oppo N1, OnePlus entered into a non-exclusive licensing agreement with Cyanogen Inc. to base its product's Android software upon Cyanogen OS, a commercial variant of the popular custom ROM CyanogenMod, and use its trademarks outside China.

The OnePlus One was officially unveiled on 23 April 2014 for a limited release on 25 April: described as a "flagship killer", its prices were set at US$299 and US$349 for the 16 GB and 64 GB models respectively—which one critic estimated was roughly half the price of the then-new Samsung Galaxy S5.

== Release and distribution ==
The device was sold online exclusively through the OnePlus website. Stock of the device was previously limited through an invite system; the company had made the device available for purchase without an invitation during special promotions, however, such as on Black Friday, and in December 2014 for the holiday shopping season. On 9 February 2015, OnePlus announced that it would begin to hold such open sales every Tuesday. In an announcement on 20 April 2015 marking the one-year anniversary of its release, OnePlus announced that the One would be available without an invite "forever", but hinted that the requirement may return for its successor. Co-founder Carl Pei explained that "by rigorously testing and improving our logistical structure over the last one year, we are far more confident that our processes have matured enough for us to handle the increased production and after-sales support that comes along with opening up sales. It's what we've been working towards, and now we're ready."

Invites were first given out through a promotion known as "Smash the Past", in which 100 users would be selected to win an opportunity to purchase a 16 GB OnePlus One for only $1, along with three invites they can give to friends, if they record a video of themselves breaking their previous phone. Some users misinterpreted the promotion, however, and prematurely posted videos on YouTube of them breaking their phones. Users were later not required to destroy their phones, and could instead donate them to the charity Medic Mobile.

OnePlus launched a second contest, "Ladies First", on 12 August 2014, inviting women to take photos of themselves holding the OnePlus logo or having drawn it on their bodies, with the winners decided by a vote receiving an invite to buy the One, and a OnePlus T-shirt. The promotion was met with controversy, as others felt that the contest promoted the objectification of women: some users posted entries that consisted of existing photos of women with OnePlus logos edited onto them, while another posted a picture of herself performing middle finger gestures, accompanied by a comment denouncing the contest as sexist. In response to the criticism, the contest was pulled only hours after it was announced: the company stated that "we want to encourage even more women to get involved with and excited about the amazing things happening in tech right now. The 'Ladies First' contest was a very misguided effort by a few isolated employees to do just that, however there is no question the post not only failed to better include our female community but actually perpetuated a stereotype that OnePlus in no way supports or condones." On 25 August 2014, OnePlus began a summer-themed photography coverage as a replacement, giving away 10,000 invites.

In December 2014, the One was released in India exclusively through Amazon; invites were still necessary to purchase the device outside special promotions, which have been held occasionally since its launch. OnePlus also announced plans to establish a presence in the country, with plans to open 25 official walk-in service centres across India.

In August 2015, nearly 18 months after its release, the One was officially released in the United Arab Emirates exclusively through a local online retailer Souq.

=== Micromax conflict ===
Sales of the OnePlus One in India were temporarily halted following a temporary injunction granted to Micromax Mobile, alleging that the sale of the device in India violated its exclusive rights to distribute Cyanogen-branded products in South Asia—an agreement announced in November 2014 as part of a new joint venture, YU, and that its agreement superseded the agreement Cyanogen Inc. had established with OnePlus. The company disputed the arguments, noting that its Cyanogen-based software was different from that of Micromax's, and argued that the exclusivity agreement only meant that Cyanogen could not partner with any other company based in India, and did not inhibit the ability for OnePlus to market its products in the country with its trademarks.

In response to the partnership, OnePlus had already begun the development of a new, in-house Android distribution, known as "OxygenOS", which it planned to replace CyanogenMod with for the device that the company planned via software updates to models distributed in India, along with a version for Chinese models known as "H2OS". On 25 December 2014, the court reversed the sales ban, noting that YU and OnePlus were within different market segments—low-end and high-end devices respectively.

== Specifications ==
=== Hardware ===
The device's internal hardware includes a quad-core Qualcomm Snapdragon 801 system-on-chip clocked at 2.5 GHz, 3 GB of RAM, and a 5.5-inch, JDI 1080p IPS LCD. It includes either 16 or 64 GB of non-expandable storage. Its rear-facing camera features a 13 megapixel, Sony-manufactured Exmor IMX214 sensor, alongside a 5-megapixel front-facing camera. The OnePlus One supports LTE networks using bands 1, 3, 4, 7, 17, 38, and 40. Due to the company's startup stature, only one model of the device was released worldwide, without any additional regional SKUs like other smartphones.

=== Exterior ===
The chassis of the OnePlus One is constructed from magnesium, and is accompanied by a curved, textured rear cover in either black or white. Special denim, Kevlar, and bamboo wood covers were also unveiled as accessories, but the bamboo covers were temporarily cancelled due to quality issues. The device features capacitive navigation keys, but they can be disabled in favor of customizable navigation keys rendered on-screen. Anandtech characterized its design as being a "close cousin" to the Oppo Find 7A , although with a non-user-replaceable battery.

=== Software ===
Outside China, the OnePlus One shipped with CyanogenMod 11S, based on Android 4.4.4 "KitKat". The latest version of CyanogenMod 11S is 11.0-XNPH05Q. In China, OnePlus One ships with Oppo's ColorOS distribution, based on Android 4.3 "Jelly Bean". Alongside additional features added to the Android platform through Cyanogen (including wider customization options, an audio equalizer, encrypted messaging, and application privacy controls), the 11S software adds persistent voice commands, and gestures that can be performed while the phone is in standby to perform various functions, such as double-tapping the screen to turn it on, drawing a circle to go to the camera, and drawing a "V" to activate flashlight mode.

An upgrade to Cyanogen OS 12.0, based on Android 5.0.2 "Lollipop" was released for all OnePlus One devices outside China on 14 April 2015. The latest version of Cyanogen OS for this phone is 13.1.2-ZNH2KAS3P0-bacon based on Android Marshmallow 6.0.1(AOSP), released in August 2016. This brings latest September Security Patches for Android and improves the deep integration of "Cortana"-Microsoft's Digital Assistant into Cyanogen OS due to strategic partnership between Microsoft and Cyanogen; Microsoft also being an important investor in the company. Two in-house Lollipop-based distributions, OxygenOS and HydrogenOS, were released earlier, on 4 April 2015, outside and inside China respectively. On 9 April 2016, OnePlus One devices running Cyanogen OS started receiving Cyanogen OS 13.0.1 based on Android Marshmallow 6.0.1. Team Cyanogen started rolling out Cyanogen OS 13.1 on 10 June 2016. CyanogenOS 13.1 for OnePlus One includes mods for Skype, OneNote, Microsoft Hyperlapse and an updated Cortana mod.

Android 9.0 "Pie" is available for the device through the successor of CyanogenMod, LineageOS. The same applied for Android 10 and Android 11. Third-party operating systems such as Ubuntu Touch can also be installed on the OnePlus One.

== Reception ==
The OnePlus One has received a positive reception, notwithstanding occasional technical issues and lack of support. The design was unique compared to other smartphones, with the rear panel's "[white] crisp smooth plastic or the [black] sandpaper-like texture [that] feels good regardless of your preference", while "the front panel is also beautiful because of its minimalist style and lack of visible hardware buttons". There was much praise for the One's hardware, shared with contemporary devices that often cost up to twice as much. Tests found that the One usually performed as well as or even better despite being half the price of its rivals, not only due to its specs but also attributed to its largely bloatware-free CyanogenMod OS. In addition, its CyanogenMod operating system offers more customization options than stock Android albeit being less stable. The OnePlus One was one of the fastest phones upon its release and its specifications have aged well after a couple of years.

The OnePlus One was generally considered superior to its closest competition. The similarly-priced Nexus 5 was more widely available and had more guaranteed updates from Google, however it suffered from some design compromises including mediocre battery life and camera quality to keep the price low, plus its internal hardware was aging. In terms of specifications and size, the OnePlus One could be compared to the much pricier 5.5-inch LG G3 whose screen was higher resolution but inferior quality.

Similar to the Google Nexus line of devices, the One has expanded the trend of high spec but mid-priced Android devices; by 2015 when the succeeding OnePlus 2 was released there was competition from numerous affordable flagships including the Moto X Pure and Asus ZenFone 2.

The OnePlus One's original distribution via an invite-only order system made the device difficult to acquire, so some reviewers decided against recommending it.

The OnePlus One, in retrospect, has been considered one of the best-supported community developer phones, with a wide variety of ROMs and custom kernels. The succeeding OnePlus 2 and subsequent OnePlus phones have not amassed such third-party support, furthermore their pricing has risen to mainstream.

=== Sales ===
As of the end of 2014, the OnePlus One has sold over one million units, despite only planning to sell up to 50,000 units. The East Asian market accounted for 39% of the company's shipments in 2014, followed by Europe with 33%, 22% in North America, and 7% in India. In total, the device generated a total revenue of $300 million through December 2014.

== Gallery ==
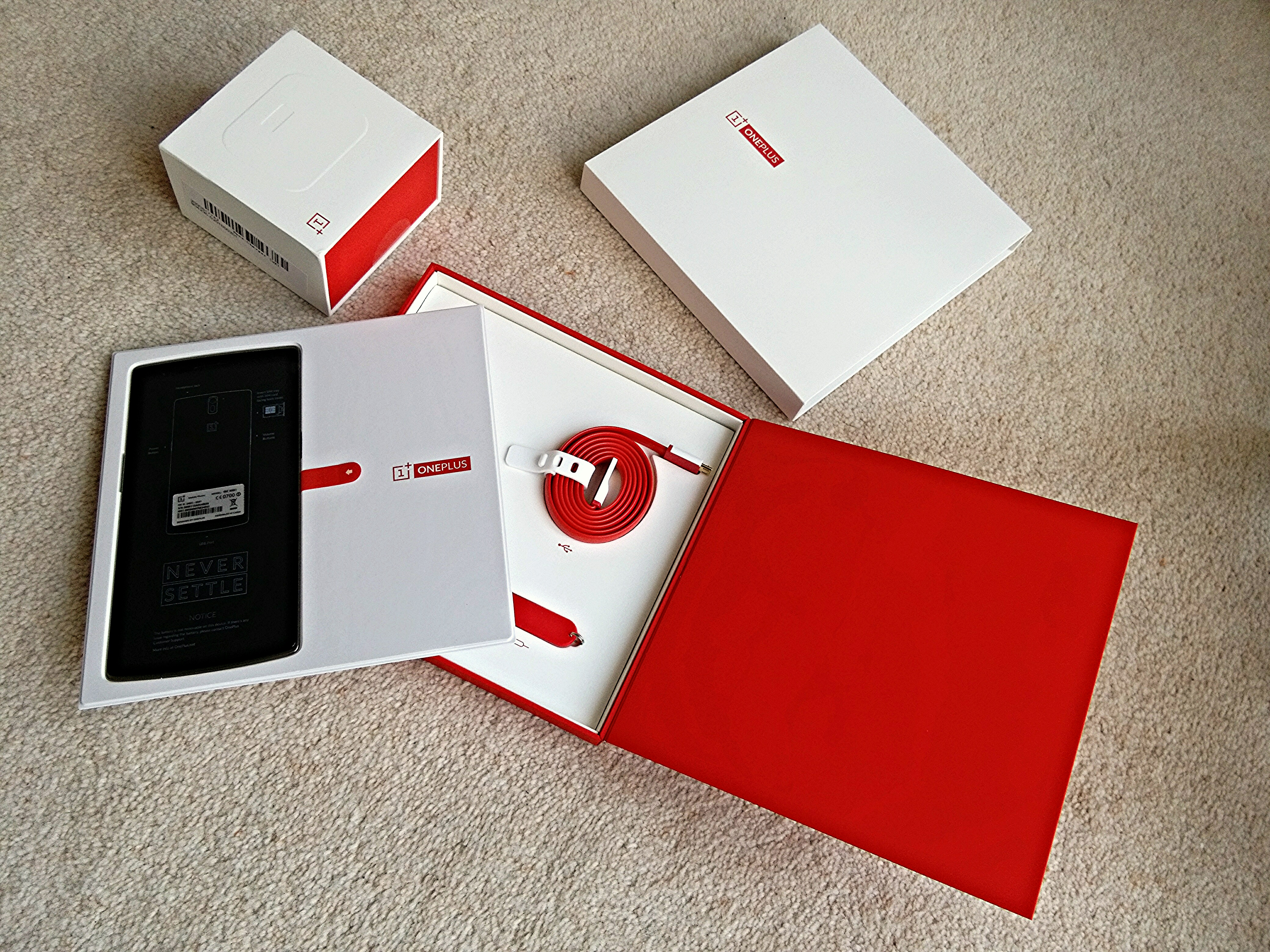
OnePlus One (unboxed set)

== See also ==
- ZUK Z1 – another CyanogenMod-powered smartphone

Preceded by First model	OnePlus One; 2014	Succeeded by OnePlus 2
