= OnePlus Nord N200 5G =

Android-based smartphone manufactured by OnePlus

- Brand: OnePlus
- Manufacturer: OnePlus
- First released: June 25, 2021; 5 years ago
- Predecessor: OnePlus Nord N100
- Successor: OnePlus Nord N300 5G
- Related: OnePlus Nord N20 5G
- Dimensions: 163.1 mm (6.42 in) H 74.9 mm (2.95 in) W 8.3 mm (0.33 in) D
- Weight: 189 g (6.7 oz)
- Operating system: Original: OxygenOS 11 (based on Android 11); Current: OxygenOS 12 (based on Android 12)
- System-on-chip: Qualcomm Snapdragon 480 (8 nm)
- CPU: Octa-core (2×2.0 GHz Kryo 260 & 6×1.8 GHz Kryo 260)
- GPU: Adreno 619
- Memory: 4 GB RAM
- Storage: 64 GB UFS 2.1
- Removable storage: microSDXC
- Battery: 5000 mAh Li-Ion
- Charging: 18 W fast-charging
- Rear camera: Triple: 13 MP f/2.2 wide, PDAF; 2 MP f/2.4 macro; 2 MP f/2.4 depth
- Front camera: 16 MP, f/2.1
- Display: 6.49 in (165 mm) (~83.2% screen-to-body ratio) 1080 × 2400 90Hz LTPS IPS LCD, 20:9 ratio (~406 ppi density)
- Sound: Stereo speakers
- Data inputs: USB-C; 3.5mm audio jack; Fingerprint sensor (side-mounted); Accelerometer; Gyro; Proximity; Barometer; Compass; NFC
- Website: www.oneplus.com/n200-5g

The OnePlus Nord N200 5G is a budget Android-based smartphone. It is the successor to the OnePlus Nord N100 released in North America in 2020. It is also the fifth phone in the Nord series by OnePlus. It runs OxygenOS 11 (Android 11) out of the box, though the device can be upgraded to OxygenOS 12 (Android 12). The device is powered by Snapdragon 480 5G (8 nm) processor. It is amongst the cheapest 5G smartphones in the Android smartphone market.

== Specifications ==
=== Hardware ===
==== Design ====
The OnePlus Nord N200 5G has a plastic frame build complemented by Gorilla Glass 3 on the front. The camera modules on the front and rear are inspired by the OnePlus 9 series. It comes in Blue Quantum color only.

==== Chipset ====
The OnePlus Nord N200 uses the Qualcomm SM4350 Snapdragon 480 processor (octa-core CPU with two 2.0 GHz Kryo 460 & six 1.8 GHz Kryo 460 and an Adreno 619 GPU), which has a 5G modem, making it the second cheapest 5G smartphone, alongside the Nokia G50.

==== Display ====
The Nord N200 5G has a 6.49 inches 90 Hz LTPS IPS LCD. 20:9 aspect ratio, 2400×1080 pixels resolution (408 ppi), with Corning Gorilla Glass 3.

==== Camera ====
The Nord N200 features a primary 13 MP (f/2.2), a macro 2 MP (f/2.4) and a 2 MP depth (f/2.4) camera on the rear. It can shoot video 1080p/30fps, and slow-motion video up to 720p/120fps.

On the flip side, it sports a 16 MP (f/2.1) camera with HDR support. It can shoot videos in 1080p/30fps.

==== Battery ====
The OnePlus Nord N200 uses a non-removable 5000 mAh Li-Ion battery. It has Fast Charge support of up to 18 W. It takes 75 minutes to reach 100% from zero. Other flagship OnePlus smartphones like OnePlus 7 series or above support Warp Charging which starts at 30 W. It lacks wireless charging support.

==== Connectivity ====
The OnePlus Nord N200 has 5G connectivity, just like the OnePlus 9 series and OnePlus 8 series.

It has support for nano-SIM and microSD, but not for dual SIM. It also supports dual band Wi-Fi 802.11 a/b/g/n/ac standards and NFC.

==== Sensors ====
The OnePlus Nord N200 has a side mounted fingerprint scanner, ambient light sensor, barometer sensor, SAR sensor, an accelerometer, a magnetic compass, gyroscope, and a proximity sensor.

==== Ports ====
In terms of ports, the Nord N200 has a USB-C 2.0 port, 3.5mm headphone jack, and a support for a microSD card (nano-SIM + microSD).

=== Software ===
The OnePlus Nord 2 5G launch is expected soon and before that, OnePlus has announced the Nord Ambassador program to attract its potential customers and enthusiasts and bring them together in a community. The Chinese company has promised benefits including free access to OnePlus Nord devices to Nord Ambassador program participants. OnePlus is essentially aiming to make Nord fans by hosting the new event – an approach that competitors including Xiaomi have used to promote products from their loyal customers and enthusiasts.

== Reception ==
Tom's Guide has called the Nord N200 as the "best budget 5G phone". As reported by The Verge, "you will get a good screen, long battery life and a 5G device that should last a few years." Android Central said, "The biggest letdown here... is that the N200 5G is only scheduled to get one major Android platform update."
