= OnePlus Nord CE 3 5G =

2020 mid-range smartphone

OnePlus Nord CE 3 5G Oppo K11
- Developer: OnePlus; Oppo
- Manufacturer: Oppo
- Type: Phablet
- Series: OnePlus Nord / Oppo K
- First released: Nord CE 3: July 5, 2023; 3 years ago Oppo K11: July 25, 2023; 3 years ago
- Availability by region: Nord CE 3: India; Oppo K11: China
- Predecessor: OnePlus Nord CE 2 5G; Oppo K10 5G
- Successor: OnePlus Nord CE4
- Related: OnePlus Nord 3 OnePlus Nord CE 3 Lite
- Compatible networks: GSM, 3G, 4G, LTE, 5G
- Form factor: Slate
- Colors: Nord CE 3: Aqua Surge, Gray Shimmer; Oppo K11: Moonshadow Gray, Glacier Blue
- Dimensions: 162.7×75.5×8.2 mm (6.41×2.97×0.32 in)
- Weight: 184 g (6 oz)
- Operating system: Nord CE 3: Initial: Android 13 with OxygenOS 13.1; Oppo K11: Initial: Android 13 with ColorOS 13.1
- System-on-chip: Qualcomm Snapdragon 782G (6 nm)
- CPU: Octa-core (1×2.7 GHz Cortex-A78 & 3×2.4 GHz Cortex-A78 & 4×1.8 GHz Cortex-A55)
- GPU: Adreno 642L
- Memory: 8/12 GB LPDDR4X
- Storage: Nord CE 3: 128/256 GB; Oppo K11: 256/512 GB; UFS 3.1
- Removable storage: microSDXC up to 1 TB
- SIM: Hybrid Dual SIM (Nano-SIM)
- Battery: Non-removable Li-Po 5000 mAh
- Charging: Nord CE 3: 80W wired SuperVOOC; Oppo K11: 100W wired SuperVOOC
- Rear camera: 50 MP Sony IMX890, f/1.8, 24 mm (wide), 1/1.56", 1µm, multi-directional PDAF, OIS + 8 MP Sony IMX355, f/2.2, 112° (ultrawide), 1/4", 1.12µm + 2 MP, f/2.4 (macro); LED flash, HDR, panorama Video: 4K@30fps, 1080p@30/60/120fps, gyro-EIS
- Front camera: 16 MP, f/2.4, 24 mm (wide), 1.0 µm HDR, panorama Video: 1080p@30fps, gyro-EIS
- Display: AMOLED, 6.7", 2412 × 1080 (Full HD+), 394 ppi, 20:9, 120 Hz
- Sound: Stereo speakers
- Connectivity: USB-C 2.0, Bluetooth 5.2 (A2DP, LE, aptX Adaptive/HD), NFC, IR blaster, Wi-Fi 802.11 a/b/g/n/ac/6 (dual-band, Wi-Fi Direct), GPS, GLONASS, BeiDou, Galileo, QZSS
- Other: Fingerprint (under display, optical), proximity, accelerometer, gyroscope, compass
- Website: Official website of OnePlus Nord CE 3 5G; Official Chinese website of Oppo K11

The OnePlus Nord CE 3 5G is a mid-range smartphone developed by OnePlus as part of the Nord CE series, serving as a simplified version of the OnePlus Nord 3.

In China, this model is sold as the Oppo K11 with differences in back panel design, higher memory configurations, and faster charging speeds.

== Design ==
The screen is protected by Corning Gorilla Glass 5, while the back panel and side frames are made of plastic.

The design of the smartphones is similar to the OnePlus Nord 3 and OnePlus Nord CE 3 Lite.

The bottom features a USB-C port, speaker, microphone, and a hybrid slot for two SIM cards or one SIM card and a microSD card up to 1 TB. The top houses a second microphone, a second speaker, and an IR blaster. The right side contains the volume buttons and the power button.

The color options differ from the following models:

- The OnePlus Nord CE 3 5G is available in Aqua Surge and Gray Shimmer colors.
- The Oppo K11 is available in Moonshadow Gray and Glacier Blue colors.

== Specifications ==
=== Platform ===
The smartphones are powered by the Qualcomm Snapdragon 782G processor and the Adreno 642L GPU.

=== Battery ===
The devices feature a 5000 mAh battery. The OnePlus Nord CE 3 5G supports 80W SUPERVOOC fast charging, while the Oppo K11 supports 100W charging.

=== Camera ===
The devices are equipped with a triple rear camera setup: a 50 MP Sony IMX890 sensor, f/1.8 (wide) with multi-directional PDAF and OIS; an 8 MP Sony IMX355, f/2.2 (ultrawide); and a 2 MP, f/2.4 (macro). The front camera is 16 MP, f/2.4 (wide). The main camera supports 4K video recording at 30fps, while the front camera supports 1080p at 30fps.

=== Display ===
The 6.7-inch AMOLED display has a Full HD+ resolution (2412 × 1080) with a pixel density of 394 ppi, a 20:9 aspect ratio, a 120 Hz refresh rate, and a centered hole-punch cutout for the front camera.

=== Audio ===
The smartphones feature stereo speakers located at the top and bottom edges.

=== Memory ===
The OnePlus Nord CE 3 5G is available in 8/128 GB and 12/256 GB configurations.

The Oppo K11 is available in 8/256 GB, 12/256 GB, and 12/512 GB configurations.

=== Software ===
The OnePlus Nord CE 3 5G launched with OxygenOS 13.1, while the Oppo K11 launched with ColorOS 13.1. Both skins are based on Android 13.
