= OnePlus Nord =

Android-based smartphone produced by OnePlus

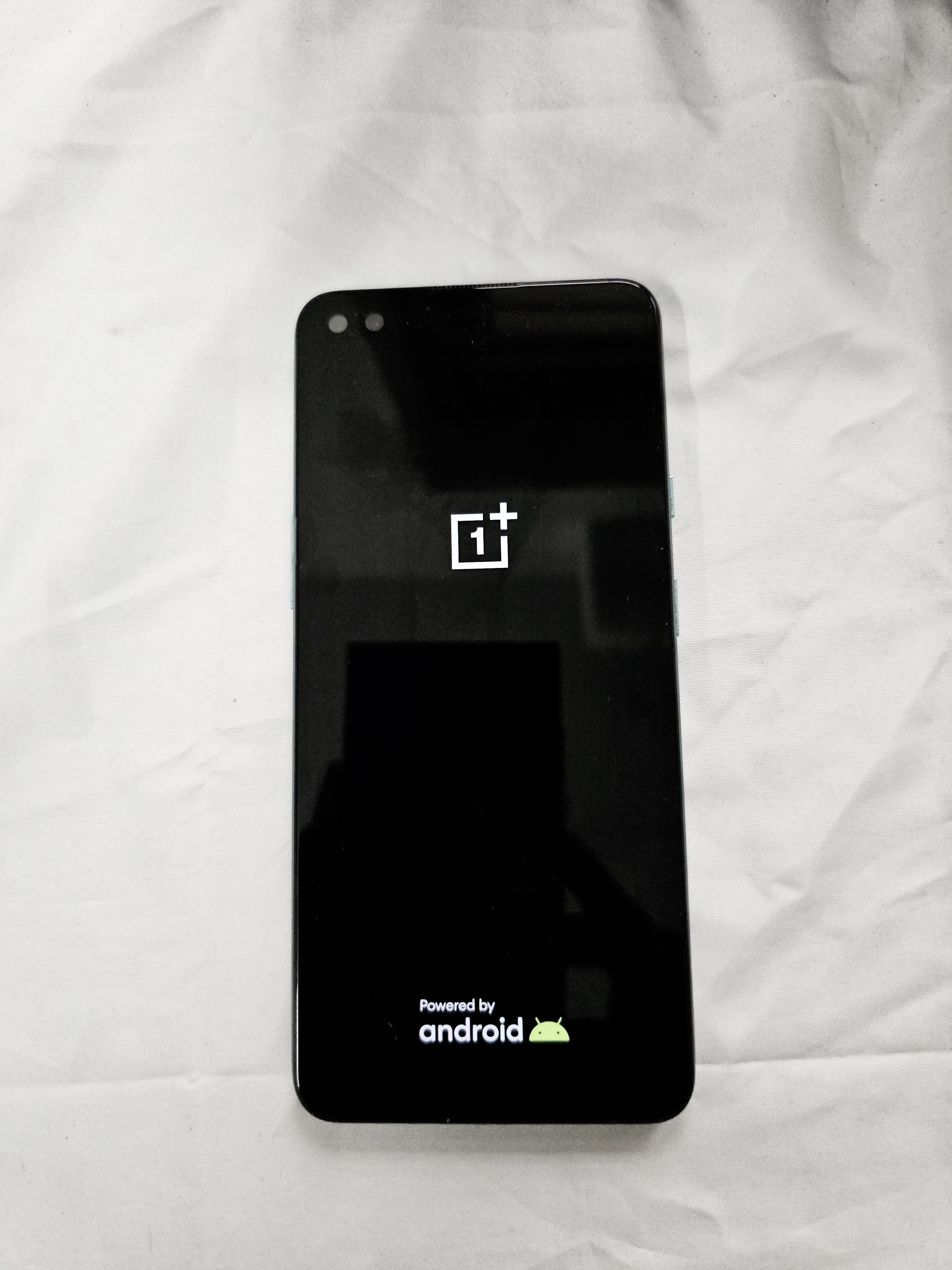
- OnePlus Nord, on the boot logo
- Brand: OnePlus
- Manufacturer: OnePlus
- Type: Phablet
- First released: 4 August 2020; 6 years ago (Note: The Blue Marble 12/256 GB variant of the phone was released on 6 August 2020 in India.)
- Availability by region: 31 countries (July 2020)
- Discontinued: July 28, 2021
- Predecessor: OnePlus X (indirect)
- Successor: OnePlus Nord 2 5G
- Related: OnePlus 8
- Compatible networks: GSM 850/900/1800/1900 MHz; CDMA bands: B1, B2, B4, B5, B8, B9, B19; LTE (US) bands: 1-5/7/8/12/17-20/26/28/32/34/38-41/66; 5G bands: 1/3/7/28/78
- Form factor: Slate
- Dimensions: 158.3 mm × 73.3 mm × 8.2 mm (6.23 in × 2.89 in × 0.32 in)
- Weight: 184 g (6.5 oz)
- Operating system: OxygenOS 10.0 (based on Android 10)
- System-on-chip: Qualcomm Snapdragon 765G
- CPU: Octa-core (1x 2.4 GHz Gold Prime, 1x 2.2 GHz Gold, 6x 1.8 GHz Silver) Kryo 475
- GPU: Adreno 620
- Modem: Dual SIM (Note: Two 4G SIM cards or one 5G SIM card, 5G+4G support available via a future update.)
- Memory: 6/8/12 GB LPDDR4X RAM
- Storage: 64/128/256 GB UFS 2.1
- Removable storage: None
- Battery: 4115 mAh; Warp Charge technology
- Rear camera: 48 MP, ƒ/1.8, 26mm, 1/1.72", 0.8 μm (wide) + 8 MP, ƒ/2.3 (ultrawide) + 5 MP, ƒ/2.4 (depth) + 2 MP, ƒ/2.4 (macro) OIS, EIS, PDAF, CAF, dual-LED flash, Auto HDR, 4K@30 fps, 1080p@30/60/240 fps
- Front camera: 32 MP, ƒ/2.5, 1/2.8", 0.8 μm (wide) + 8 MP, ƒ/2.5, 1/4", 1.12 μm (ultrawide); 4K@30/60 fps, 1080p@30/60 fps
- Display: Fluid AMOLED capacitive touchscreen 6.44 in (164 mm) 2400 × 1080 1080p, (408 ppi with 20:9 aspect ratio), 90 Hz refresh rate, Gorilla Glass 5, 16M colors, HDR10+/HLG, DCI-P3 support
- Sound: Mono super linear speaker
- Connectivity: Bluetooth 5.1; Wi-Fi 802.11 a/b/g/n/ac; A2DP, LE, aptX HD wifi 6
- Data inputs: Fingerprint scanner; Accelerometer; Gyroscope; Proximity sensor; Electronic compass
- Model: AC2001 (India); AC2003 (Europe)
- Codename: Avicii
- Website: www.oneplus.com/global/nord

The OnePlus Nord (code-named Avicii) is an Android-based smartphone manufactured by OnePlus, unveiled on 21 July 2020. It is the first device in the Nord series. It is the first mid-range smartphone from OnePlus since the 2015 OnePlus X. It is available in Europe, India, Hong Kong, and Malaysia. Android Police has suggested that the OnePlus Nord is only launching in countries where cheap smartphones that can be bought outright are more popular than expensive ones that consumers can only afford via monthly payments and carrier subsidies.

There was a beta program in which OnePlus gave 50 people in the United States and Canada a OnePlus Nord for a review, letting some of them keep the phone afterwards, depending on the quality of said review.

When purchasing the phone, OnePlus offers three options: 6/64 GB, 8/128 GB, and 12/256 GB and more. The 6/64 GB variant is only available in India and will be available in September. Also, the Blue Marble 12 GB RAM / 256 GB storage variant of the phone was released on 6 August 2020 in India. Although the OnePlus Nord does not have an official IP rating, the co-founder Carl Pei in an interview with MKBHD stated that the phone could survive a 30 cm (one foot) drop in water for 30 seconds.

== History ==
On 7 December 2019, a render of a mid-range OnePlus phone was leaked. It looked like a Samsung Galaxy S20, with a hole-punch on the top-middle. There is also a SIM card slot on the top and two holes for the speaker on the bottom. The render appeared to have a laser for focusing. OnePlus Nord was previously rumored to be named the OnePlus 8 Lite or OnePlus Z. OnePlus officially confirmed the name Nord on 30 June 2020. The phone is codenamed Avicii, named after the stage name of Tim Bergling, a Swedish DJ.

In an interview with MKBHD, co-founder Carl Pei revealed the design. The camera setup was detailed in a forum announcement. Prototypes were later shown in a teaser video posted on Instagram. According to Pei, Nord is derived from the word for north (According to OnePlus, north on a compass "points towards growth and success") in several European languages, representing the North Star. OnePlus revealed the device both online and via an AR app. On 18 August a documentary ("New Beginnings") about the OnePlus Nord realization came exclusive on Amazon Prime Video.

The phone has been marked as EoL since January 2024.

== Specifications ==
=== Hardware ===
==== Design ====
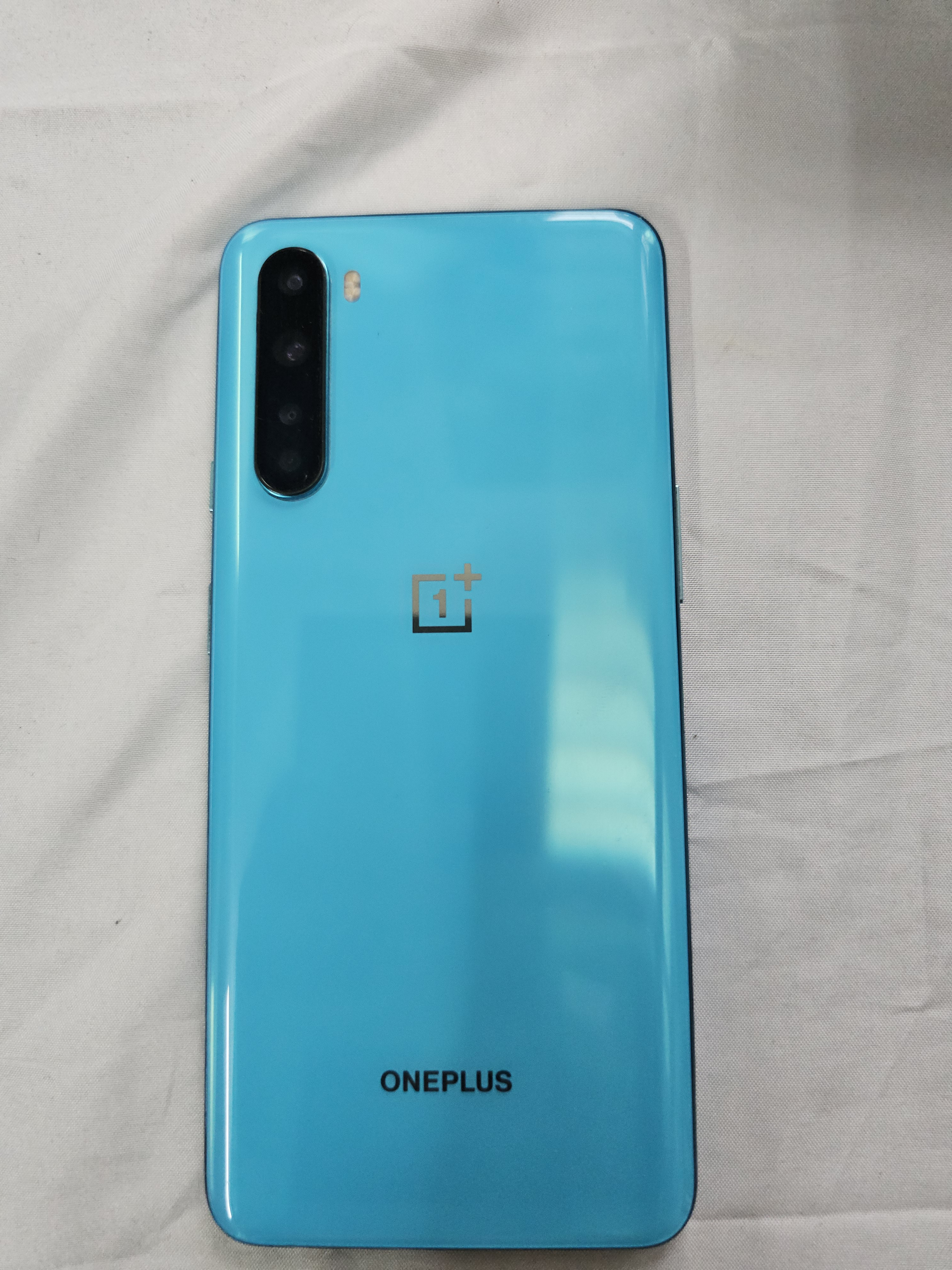
The back of OnePlus Nord in Blue Marble

The Nord has a plastic frame with a metallic coat applied to the plastic to give the appearance of real metal. It also has a raised plastic frame around the display. The device measures 158.3 mm × 73.3 mm × 8.2 mm (6.23 in × 2.89 in × 0.32 in) and weighs 184 grams (6.5 oz). It is considered a premium flagship-like build with a polished chassis between the front, made of Gorilla Glass 5, aluminum buttons, and a gloss finish and iridescent back. The smooth glass design of the phone means that sometimes it can be slippery. On 27 July 2020, it was reported that the device chassis was susceptible to bending under pressure. The pressure caused cracks to appear near the volume and power button and the display to die in extreme situations.

The OnePlus Nord design is similar to the design of the Realme X50 Pro. There are rumors that the OnePlus Nord is just a rebadged Oppo Reno4 5G smartphone.

In addition to the 6.44-inch (164 mm) touchscreen, it has a metallic power button located at the right side, the metallic alert slider just below it, metallic volume up/down button at the left side, and USB-C (USB 2.0) port, mono speaker and the plastic SIM card slot on the bottom. There is no 3.5 mm headphone jack.

The Nord does not have a curved display. The OnePlus Nord does not sit flush because of a camera bump in the left corner, raising the phone a few millimeters from the surface. The OnePlus Nord has two choices of colours: Blue Marble and Gray Onyx. There could be a third choice for future carrier launch, which is Gray Ash.

==== Chipset ====
The OnePlus Nord uses the Qualcomm Snapdragon 765G processor (octa-core CPU with a 2.4 GHz Kryo 475 Prime core, a 2.2 GHz Kryo 475 Gold core, 6 1.8 GHz Kryo 475 Silver core and an Adreno 620 GPU), which has a 5G modem, (Note: The maximum download speed of the chipset modem is 3.3 Gbps.) making it the cheapest 5G smartphone. It is slower than the Qualcomm Snapdragon 865 used in OnePlus 8. This is one way OnePlus manages to lower the cost of the Nord.

==== Display ====
The phone has a 6.44-inch 90 Hz (refresh rate) 20:9 aspect ratio, Fluid AMOLED, 2400 × 1080 pixels resolution (Full HD+ 2.592 megapixels at 408 ppi), HDR10/HDR10+/HLG, Gorilla Glass 5, and 180 Hz touch response rate display with sRGB and DCI-P3 support. The display has an in-display fingerprint sensor on the bottom and hole-punch at the top for the dual front camera system. The screen is similar but smaller than the OnePlus 8. The screen's maximum brightness is rated at 1000 nits of brightness with HDR, 700 nits in normal conditions, and can sustain close to 500 nits of brightness. Marques Brownlee reported that the screen has some minor rainbow and tint problems. Some owners complained that the OnePlus Nord has tinting problems at low brightness. Android Authority stated that the tinting problems at low brightness levels is common in OLED screens, across all smartphone or screen manufacturer.

The screen is pre-applied with a screen protector in place.

==== Camera ====
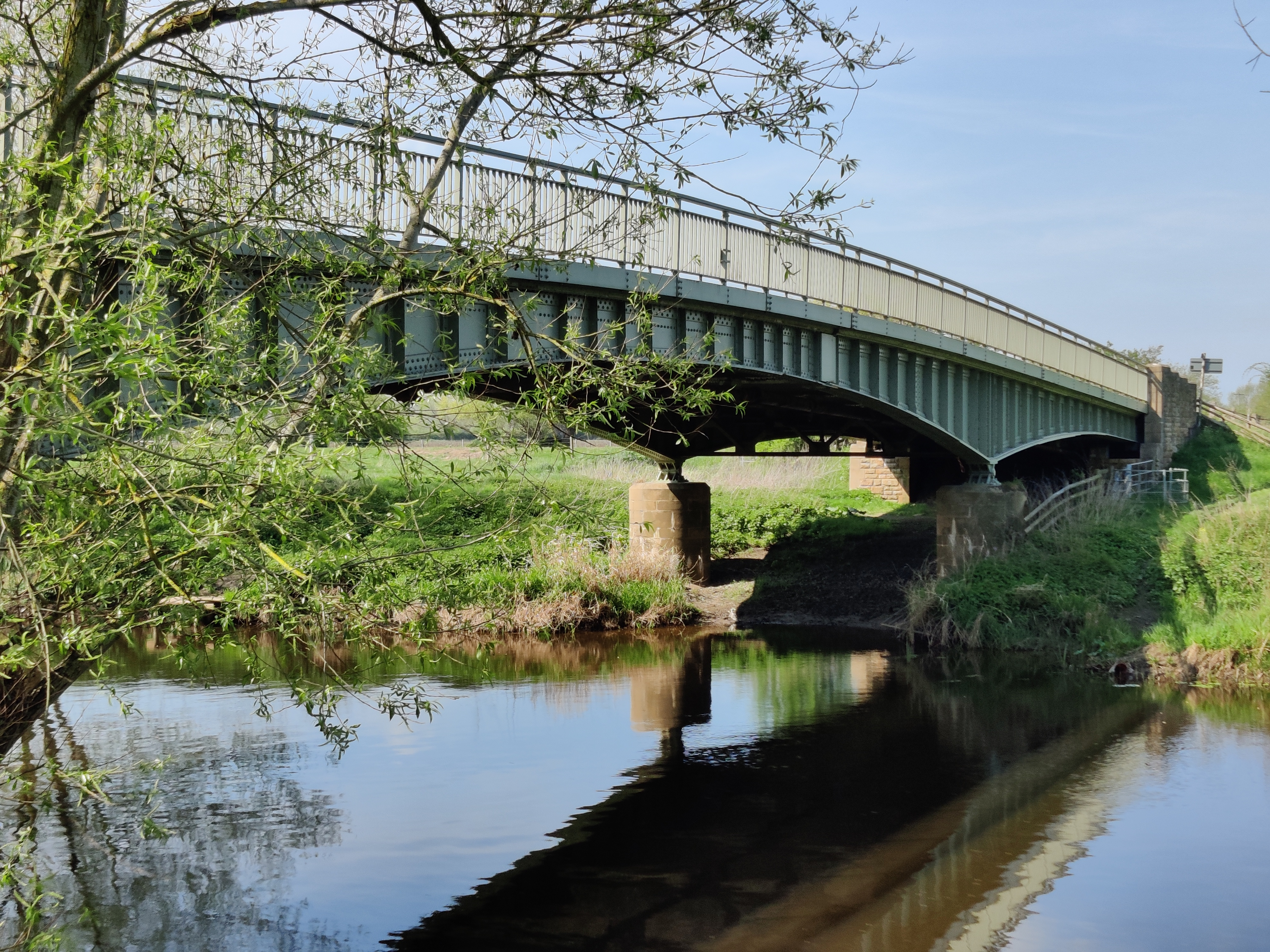
Jubilee Bridge, Worcestershire, England, taken with a OnePlus Nord

The primary camera is a 48 MP ƒ/1.8 0.8 μm Sony IMX586 main camera with OIS,. It also has an 8 MP ƒ/2.3 119° FOV ultrawide angle camera, a 5 MP ƒ/2.4 depth sensor and a 2 MP ƒ/2.4 macro camera. It can shoot video up to 4K/30 fps, and slow-motion video up to 1080p/240 fps.

OnePlus Nord has a dual front camera system. One is the 32 MP Sony IMX616 ƒ/2.5 0.8 μm primary camera; the other one is an 8 MP ƒ/2.5 105° FOV ultrawide angle camera.

It can shoot video up to 4K/60 fps with the primary camera and 4K/30 fps with the ultrawide angle camera. The front camera system as a whole cannot use Nightscape mode. In daylight, the main rear camera image quality is good and similar to the OnePlus 8. (Note: The pictures taken by OnePlus Nord has a little bit less saturation, a little bit more noise, and a little bit softer than the picture taken by OnePlus 8.) Low-light performance ranges from acceptable to good, though not flagship-like quality. The macro camera's quality is at best average, and at worst, poor. The portrait mode quality is mixed. The image quality is pretty good, but it has edge detection problems. Later, MKBHD stated that the portrait mode, even with the depth sensor covered up, works with similar quality. In terms of video quality, the video taken by OnePlus Nord is sharp and stable thanks to the stabilization.

The image quality taken with the front cameras ranges from poor to good. In low-light situations, the image quality is even worse.

Overall, the camera system on the OnePlus Nord is good, but not flagship-quality.

==== Battery ====
The OnePlus Nord uses a non-removable 4115 mAh Li-Po battery. It has Warp Charge 30T support, which charges the phone from empty to 70% in half an hour. It has no wireless charging. Charging from empty to 50% takes 25 minutes, and charging from empty to 100% takes around an hour. For heavy use, the phone lasted a day, and under normal conditions could last two days. The screen-time ranges from around 5–10 hours (6 hours for heavy use).

==== Connectivity ====
The OnePlus Nord has 5G connectivity, just like the OnePlus 8 and OnePlus 8 Pro, with five 5G bands. Despite early reports saying it might support millimeter-wave 5G, it only supports sub-6 GHz 5G and does not support millimeter-wave 5G, which has faster speeds. Therefore, it won't work with carriers that use the millimeter-wave 5G bands used by the Verizon Wireless in the US or Rogers in Canada as well as other 5G bands used by other carriers in North America (such as Band 71). It also supports dual band Wi-Fi 802.11 a/b/g/n/ac standards and NFC.

==== Sensors ====
According to currently released info from GSMArena, the OnePlus Nord has a Hall-effect sensor, an in-display fingerprint scanner, an accelerometer, a gyroscope, and a proximity sensor.

==== Accessories ====
At retail, the OnePlus Nord includes a clear silicone case, a red USB-C cable, and a Warp Charge (30 W) charger. In France, an earphone is also included. Accessories for the OnePlus Nord include the OnePlus Buds, and the cases from OnePlus (2 Sandstone cases in different colors, a clear bumper case, and three creator case with a JerryRigEverything, Finsta, and Camilla Engström theme, respectively.)

=== Software ===
==== User interface ====
The OnePlus Nord is powered by Android, a Linux-based, open-source mobile operating system developed by Google and introduced commercially in 2008. Among other features, the software allows users to maintain customized home screens, which can contain shortcuts to applications and widgets for displaying information. Shortcuts to frequently used applications can be stored on a dock at the bottom of the screen; swiping anywhere on the home screen up opens the application drawer displaying a menu containing all of the apps installed on the device. A tray accessed by dragging from the top of the display or dragging down anywhere on the home screen allows users to view notifications received from other apps. It contains toggle switches for commonly used functions.

The OnePlus Nord ships with OxygenOS 10.5, which is based on Android 10. In terms of preinstalled software, OxygenOS only has preinstalled Google communications apps, such as Google Duo, Phone, and Message. OnePlus claims the phone receives two years of updates and three years of security updates.

On 1 March 2021, OnePlus Nord started receiving first stable build for Android 11 via an OxygenOS 11 build.

==== Special features ====
OnePlus Nord includes wallpapers with elements of the Scandinavian region, and ringtones inspired by famous Scandinavian electronic musicians. In India, the phone also gets special features, like app-by-app notification muting in profiles, and an app for wallpaper sharing.

OxygenOS has an app locker, which secures the apps chosen by the user with a PIN or with fingerprint to avoid unwanted use, on-screen gestures to replace the standard three-button navigation button layout, off-screen gestures to launch essential apps quickly and to control music playback, Shelf which displays the weather, notes, and selected apps & contacts, Gaming mode to silence notifications except inbound calls & alarms and turn off automatic brightness adjusting, Fnatic mode to put all resources into a game, stop all non-essential process in the background, and block all notifications except alarms, Smart Boost feature to speed up loading times of a game, Zen mode to lockdown the phone for 20 minutes, fingerprint gesture to open apps without unlocking the phone, Hidden Space to hide apps from the application drawer without uninstalling them, and parallel apps to create a second app with different profiles than the first one.

==== Camera app ====
There are many modes available, such as Portrait Mode, which makes the background blurry, Cine Aspect Ratio to record video in 21:9 (cinematic) aspect ratio, and Nightscape Mode, which is similar to other smartphones in its price range, which lets the user take brighter pictures at low light environments. There is a 2x zoom icon that, when pressed, zooms the images in by 2x (digital zoom), and if flicked, will reveal a wheel that scrolls up to 10x. The 2x zoom images look good outdoors; else, the image will be dark and have noise. The 10x zoom images have decent detail in outdoor lighting. There are problems with the time it takes to switch from one camera to another, and that Nightscape Mode doesn't work in the ultrawide camera. Android Authority reported that the denoising processing ruined all pictures captured with the phone. The OnePlus Nord tends to make skins brighter, smoother, and more yellow, which is common for OnePlus devices.

==== Updates ====
On 22 July 2020, just one day after the phone's unveiling, an update was released that updated OxygenOS to OxygenOS 10.5.1. The update improved the depth effect, indoor picture quality, power efficiency when recording at 4K/60 fps, and the overall camera experience. It also improved system stability and video calling quality.

On 23 July 2020, an update was released that updated the firmware to 10.5.2 and patched security flaws. The update improved the pairing process of the OnePlus Buds, optimized a gesture to open the camera, and added 90 Hz support to Dailyhunt (India only), which is an Indian news app. The update also further optimized video calling performance and power efficiency when recording video at 4K/60 fps, and fixed general issues.

On 5 August 2020, a small update came out. The small update updated OxygenOS to 10.5.3 and improved the stability of the system.

On 10 August 2020, an update that updated the firmware to 10.5.4 was released. The update includes display and camera improvements, shortened the launch time of the gallery app, and it fixes an issue with background music playing while using the front camera. The update also improves the video call quality, color accuracy, and white balance while in low-light situations for the front cameras and the color accuracy and saturation of the macro camera.

On 7 September 2020, OxygenOS 10.5.7 rolled out, with improvements for/into 4K/60 fps stabilization, image clarity for the macro camera, Bluetooth, voice call stability, the display, and power consumption.

On 30 September 2020, OxygenOS 10.5.8 was released in a staggered fashion. This is a minor update, with increased stability for network, display, and camera OIS.

On 2 March 2021, OnePlus Nord gets a stable OxygenOS 11 update. This update brings major changes to the interface (including dark mode) and even enables the Always On Display feature.

== Reception ==
The OnePlus Nord received positive pre-release reviews from CNET reviewer Andrew Hoyle, citing the good specifications, 5G capability, and the affordability. They criticized the phone's lack of IP rating.

TechRadar reviewer John McCann recommended the phone to those who want a flagship-like experience but at affordable prices, affordable 5G phone, and want flexibility when taking images. They discouraged purchase by those who want water resistance, get many notifications, and want a long-lasting phone that lasts two days without a charge.

GSMArena rated the phone positive from initial impressions with the phone because of the flagship-like design and build, good screen, good performance, and bloatware-free OS. They criticized the lack of space for the notification bar, lack of IP rating, and lack of a headphone jack.

OnePlus Nord received positive reviews from Tom's Guide reviewer Richard Priday, citing its many cameras, 90 Hz display, great design for a mid-range phone, and excellent battery life. They criticized the macro camera, the average performance, the lack of wireless charging, and the fact that OnePlus Nord won't be coming to the United States.

The Verge reviewer Jon Porter recommended the phone to the vast majority of customers, with some minor caveats, like the mono, downward-firing, low bass, speaker, and the 90 Hz refresh rate screen not being fully utilized because of the not-quite-flagship processor.

In India, Beebom recommended the phone to every customer except those who play resource-demanding games, citing its all-round specs, good display, design, and the main rear and front (both primary and ultrawide) cameras. He experienced issues with noise in the macro camera.

== See also ==
- OnePlus Nord 2
- OnePlus 8
- OnePlus X
- iPhone SE 2020
