= Sony Ericsson Xperia Active =

Smartphone produced by Sony Ericsson

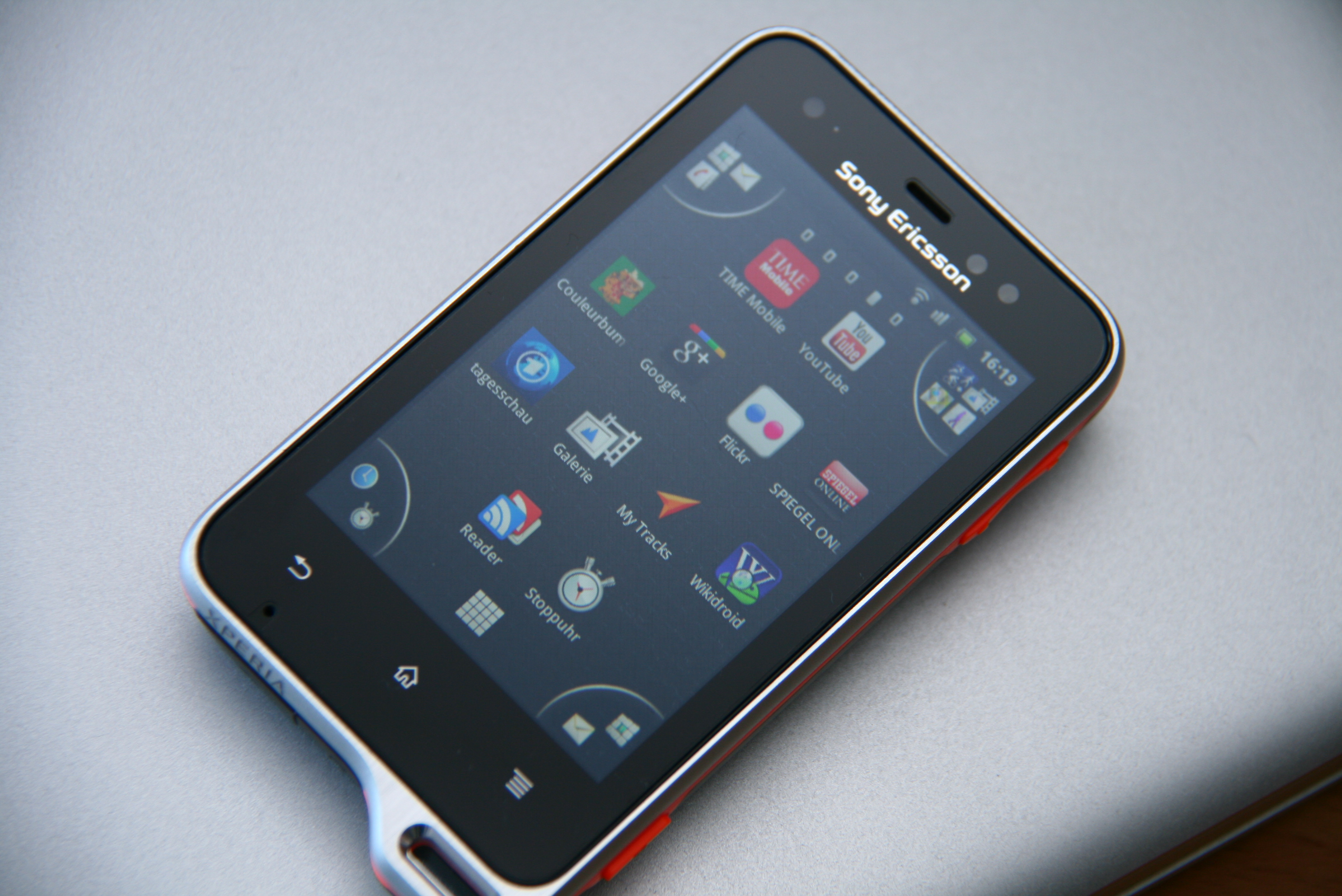
- Also known as: Sony Ericsson ST17i, Sony Ericsson ST17a
- Manufacturer: Sony Mobile Communications
- Type: Smartphone
- Series: Sony Xperia
- First released: 1 October 2011; 14 years ago
- Availability by region: October 2011
- Successor: Sony Xperia Go
- Related: Xperia mini
- Compatible networks: UMTS/HSPA
- Form factor: Slate Smartphone (Orange/Black, White/Black)
- Dimensions: 92.0 mm (3.62 in) H 55.0 mm (2.17 in) W 16.5 mm (0.65 in) D
- Weight: 110.8 g (3.91 oz)
- Operating system: Android 2.3.4 (Gingerbread); Officially upgradeable up to Android 4.0.4 (Ice Cream Sandwich); Unofficially upgradeable to: Android 4.0.4 (Ice Cream Sandwich) via CyanogenMod 9, Android 4.1.2 (JellyBean) via CyanogenMod 10, Android 4.2.2 (JellyBean) via CyanogenMod 10.1, Android 4.3.1 (JellyBean) via CyanogenMod 10.2, Android 4.4.2 (Kitkat) via CyanogenMod 11
- CPU: Qualcomm MSM 8255 1 GHz Scorpion (Snapdragon)
- GPU: Adreno 205
- Memory: 512 MB
- Storage: 1 GB (320 MB available to user)
- Removable storage: microSDHC, 2 GB (supports up to 32 GB)
- Battery: EP500; 1,200 mAh 4.5 Wh, 3.7 V Internal rechargeable li-po User replaceable Stand-by Up to 351 h (2G) / Up to 335 h (3G); Talk time Up to 4 h 53 min (2G) / Up to 5 h 31 min (3G); Music play Up to 25 h
- Rear camera: 5 MP 2592×1944 px 8× digital zoom Autofocus; Flash LED illumination 720p HD video recording Face recognition Geo-tagging; Image and video stabilizer Smile detection Touch focus, Video 720p HD (Android 2.3)
- Front camera: None
- Display: LED-backlit LCD "Reality Display" with Mobile BRAVIA Engine, 3.0 in (76 mm) diagonal 320×480 px HVGA; 3:2 aspect-ratio 16M colors Protection Scratch-resistant glass – Touch sensitive controls – Timescape UI
- Connectivity: Wi-Fi (802.11 b/g/n); Bluetooth 2.1 + EDR; Quad-band GSM/GPRS/EDGE; 850/900/1800/1900 MHz ST17a model: tri-band UMTS/HSPA; 850/1900/2100 MHz ST17i model: dual-band UMTS/HSPA; 900/2100 MHz
- Data inputs: Multi-touch capacitive touchscreen, accelerometer
- Codename: Satsuma
- Other: Sound Single loudspeaker Sony xLOUD enhancement 3.5 mm TRRS; Messaging SMS (threaded view), MMS, Email, Push email, IM; Browser HTML, Adobe Flash; Radio Stereo FM radio with RDS; GPS with A-GPS support Java via Java MIDP emulator – Dust and water resistant – Flashlight – SNS integration – TrackID music recognition – Google Search, Maps, Gmail, YouTube, Calendar, Google Talk – Document viewer – Voice memo – Predictive text input

The Sony Ericsson Xperia Active is a smartphone produced by Sony Ericsson. Released in October 2011, it was the last smartphone released under the Sony Ericsson brand before Sony bought out Ericsson's stake in the joint-venture. It runs the Android operating system. It contains similar hardware as other 2011 Xperia phones in a smaller package. The phone is marketed towards people with an 'active lifestyle', hence the name, and comes with a scratch resistant screen, dust and water resistant casing and pre-loaded fitness applications. It is small in size with a 3" touchscreen with wet finger tracking, similar to that of the Xperia Mini.

It has a two-layer removable rear cover.

== See also ==
- Motorola Defy
