= Imageon =

Defunct series of media coprocessors and chipsets

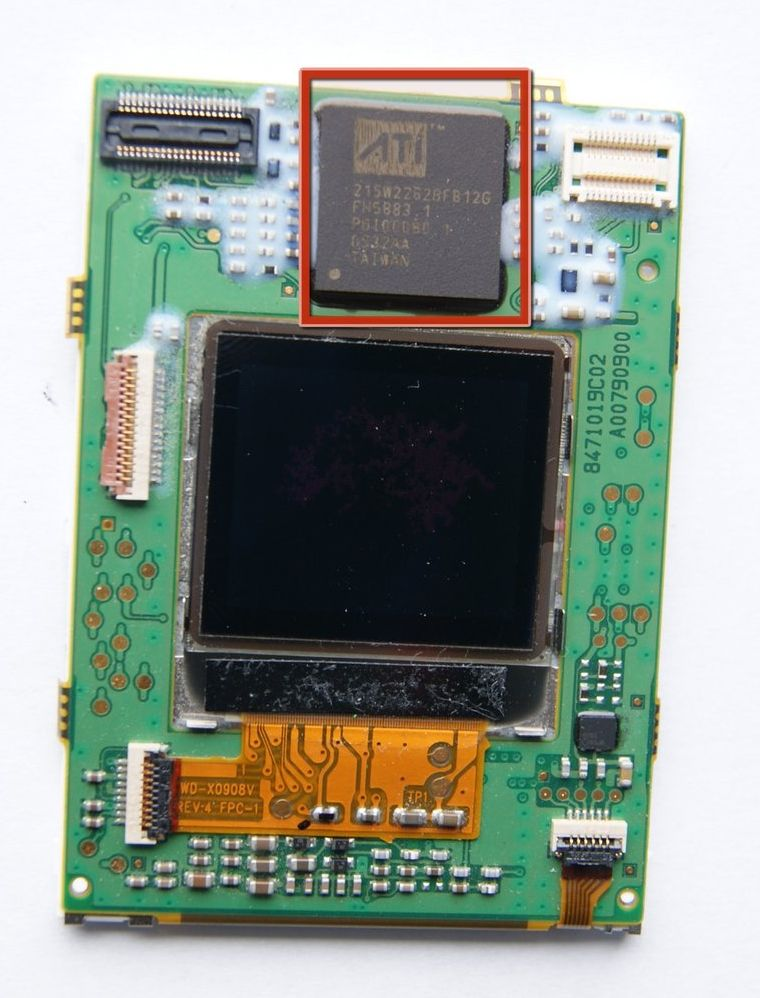
Photo from an iFixit Teardown, showcasing the ATI Imageon 2262 used inside a Motorola RAZR V3i

Imageon (previously ATI Imageon) was a series of media coprocessors and mobile chipsets produced by ATI (later AMD) in 2002–2008, providing graphics acceleration and other multimedia features for handheld devices such as mobile phones and Personal Digital Assistants (PDAs). AMD later sold the Imageon mobile handheld graphics division to Qualcomm in 2009, where it was used exclusively inside their Snapdragon SoC processors under the Adreno brand name.

== History ==
Many of the Imageon processors were simply camera, multimedia, and display ISP's. Most only provided basic acceleration for 2D graphics, photo, video and audio encoding and decoding. However, they still played an essential role in enabling broad adoption of multimedia (camera and video) capabilities in featurephones, having shipped over 100 million Imageon processors by the start of 2006, and 200 million by early 2007.

Since few of the early Imageon models offered full 3D hardware acceleration, ATI partnered with various middleware companies to offer software 3D rendering capabilities instead, such as the X-Forge 3D SDK produced by FatHammer, as used on the Symbian platform, and on the Tapwave Zodiac.

In 2006, ATI acquired BitBoys, adding additional talent and experience with vector graphics to their mobile and handheld graphics team.

After AMD's acquisition of ATI in 2006, AMD licensed their mobile graphics technology to Qualcomm in April 2007 who integrated it into their Snapdragon processor family under their Adreno brand name. AMD subsequently sold off the mobile handheld graphics division to Qualcomm in 2009 for $65M following an earlier sale of the Xilleon branch to Broadcom.

AMD retained the Imageon name and provided support for existing customers, although no future Imageon products were introduced. However, as a result of company restructuring, AMD divested the handheld chipset business starting from the second quarter of 2008, thus the line is deemed officially discontinued.

In total, the Imageon line-up was used in over 50 different mobile device models, and AMD claimed to have shipped nearly 250 million Imageon units to customers since 2003.

== Products ==
=== 2D Products ===
Product	Announced date	Fab (nm)	Memory	Max resolution	Codec Support	Devices
Imageon 1xx series
Imageon 100	January 2002		384 kB embedded and 8 MB Max	320×240 or 800×600	MPEG-4	Toshiba e740, e740 BT
Imageon 21xx series
Imageon 2182						Siemens SL75
Imageon 2192			8 MB			
Imageon 22xx series						
Imageon 2200				320×240		
Imageon 2240	2005 ?	130				Motorola SLVR L6 and L7
Imageon 2250				320×240		Motorola Razr V3
Imageon 2260	2004					
Imageon 2262						Motorola Razr V3i
Imageon 2282	2006					LG prada KE850, Samsung SPH-V7800
Imageon 2294						
Imageon 2298						
Imageon 4xxx series						
Imageon 4200	May 2003		8MB			Tapwave Zodiac (W4200)
Imageon M1xx series						
Imageon M100 (ex 22xx)						
Imageon M180 (ex 22xx)						LG KC550
Imageon Other						
Imageon A250				720 x 486	DivX	
Imageon D160						
Product	Announced date	Fab (nm)	Memory	Max resolution	Codec Support	Devices

=== 3D Products ===
Product	Announced date	Fab (nm)	Memory	Clock rate (MHz)	Fillrate			Max resolution	Supported API version			Devices
Product	Announced date	Fab (nm)	Memory	Clock rate (MHz)	Triangle [MT/s]	Pixel [GP/s]	Texture [GT/s]	Max resolution	OpenGL	OpenGL ES	OpenVG	Devices
Imageon 32xx series
Imageon 3200	November 2002		384 kB					320×480	Yes	Yes		
Imageon 3220			2 MB					480×640				HP ipaq hx4700
Imageon 23xx series
Imageon 2300	January 2004		8 MB	100	1		0.1	320×240 @ 16-bit	1.0	Yes		
Imageon 2302			2 MB									
Imageon W2300					1							
Imageon 2380	2006		16 MB					640×480	1.1	1.2		
Imageon 2388	2006							640×480	1.1	1.2		
Imageon Z4xx series
Imageon Z460	February 2008							854×480 or 640×360	1.x	2.0	1.0	
Imageon Z430	February 2008								1.x	2.0	1.0	
Product	Announced date	Fab (nm)	Memory	Clock rate (MHz)	Triangle [MT/s]	Pixel [GP/s]	Texture [GT/s]	Max resolution	OpenGL	OpenGL ES	OpenVG	Devices
Product	Announced date	Fab (nm)	Memory	Clock rate (MHz)	Fillrate			Max resolution	Supported API version			Devices

=== Physical Products ===
==== Imageon 100 ====
This was a display co-processor for handheld devices released in January 2002, offering both a 2D graphics engine and MPEG decoding support, supporting displays up to 320×240 (or 800×600 if additional RAM is provided). This processor was used in the Toshiba Pocket e740 to assist with video decoding, but required the use of specific software to provide a benefit.

==== Imageon 3200 ====
The 3200 series was announced in November 2002, and was targeted for use in PDAs, featuring a 2D graphics engine, multimedia playback (MJPEG/JPEG) capabilities, and additional peripheral functions. This processor supported displays up to 320×480. The Imageon 3220 was used in the HP iPAQ hx4700.

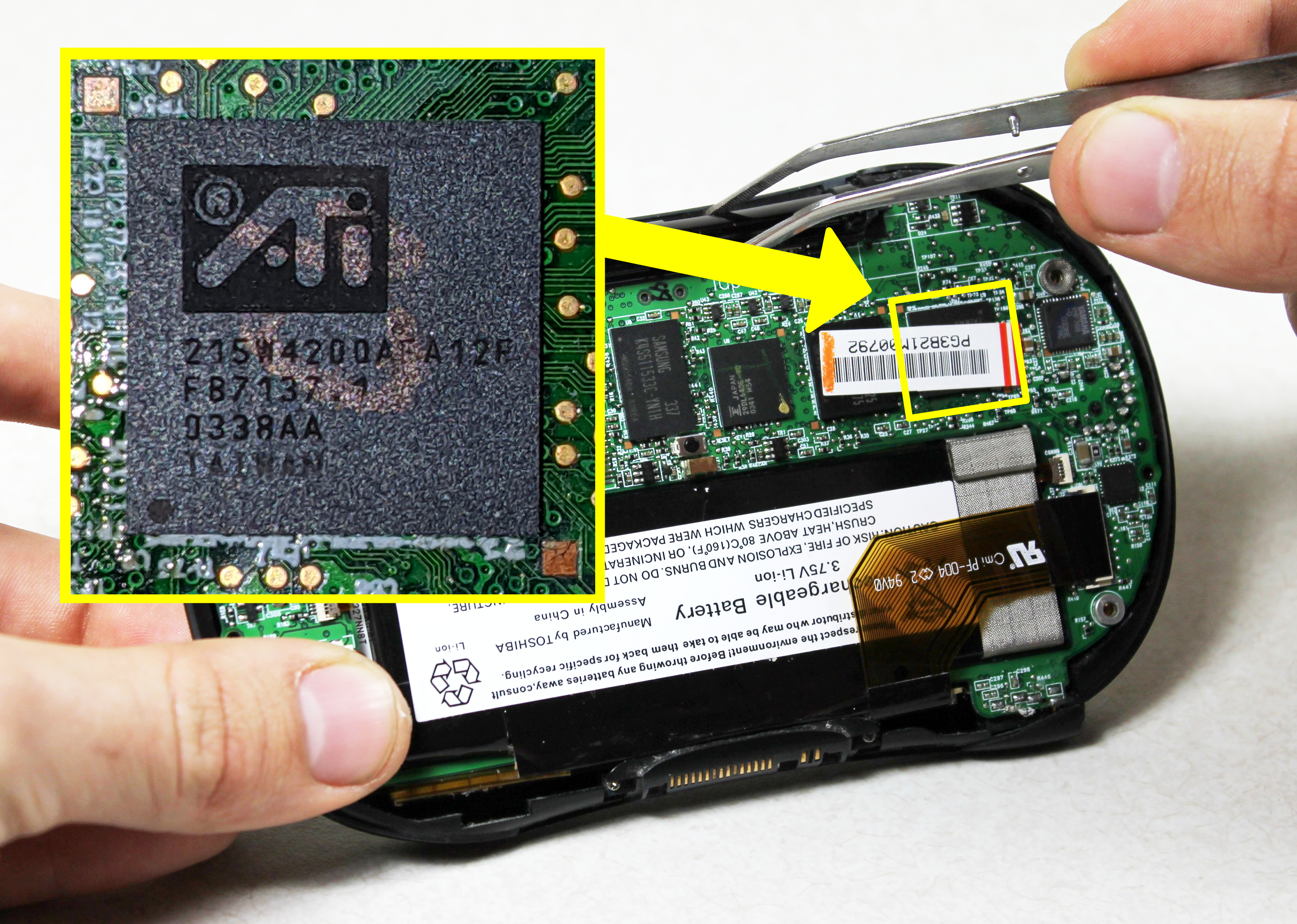
ATI Imageon W4200 from Tapwave Zodiac

==== Imageon 4200 ====
The ATI W4200 was used in the Tapwave Zodiac gaming handheld PDA, announced in May 2003. Featuring 8MB of RAM, the W4200 was exclusively a 2D graphics and multimedia accelerator, so Tapwave licensed the X-forge software 3D engine to provide 3D graphics capabilities. This product was also found in the Sigmarion 3 Palmtop.

==== Imageon 22x0 series ====
These models were primarily 2D graphics and multimedia accelerators, combined with image signal processor (ISP) functions. They improved upon the Imageon 100 and 3200, by offering support for capture of photos and videos from digital camera sensors, as well as supporting multimedia (MPEG4) playback, and higher resolution display screens. The capabilities varied from model to model. Models include the Imageon 2200, 2240, 2250, 2260, 2262, and later, the 2282, and 2182. These processors were used in numerous popular Motorola feature-phones, such as the Motorola Razr V3

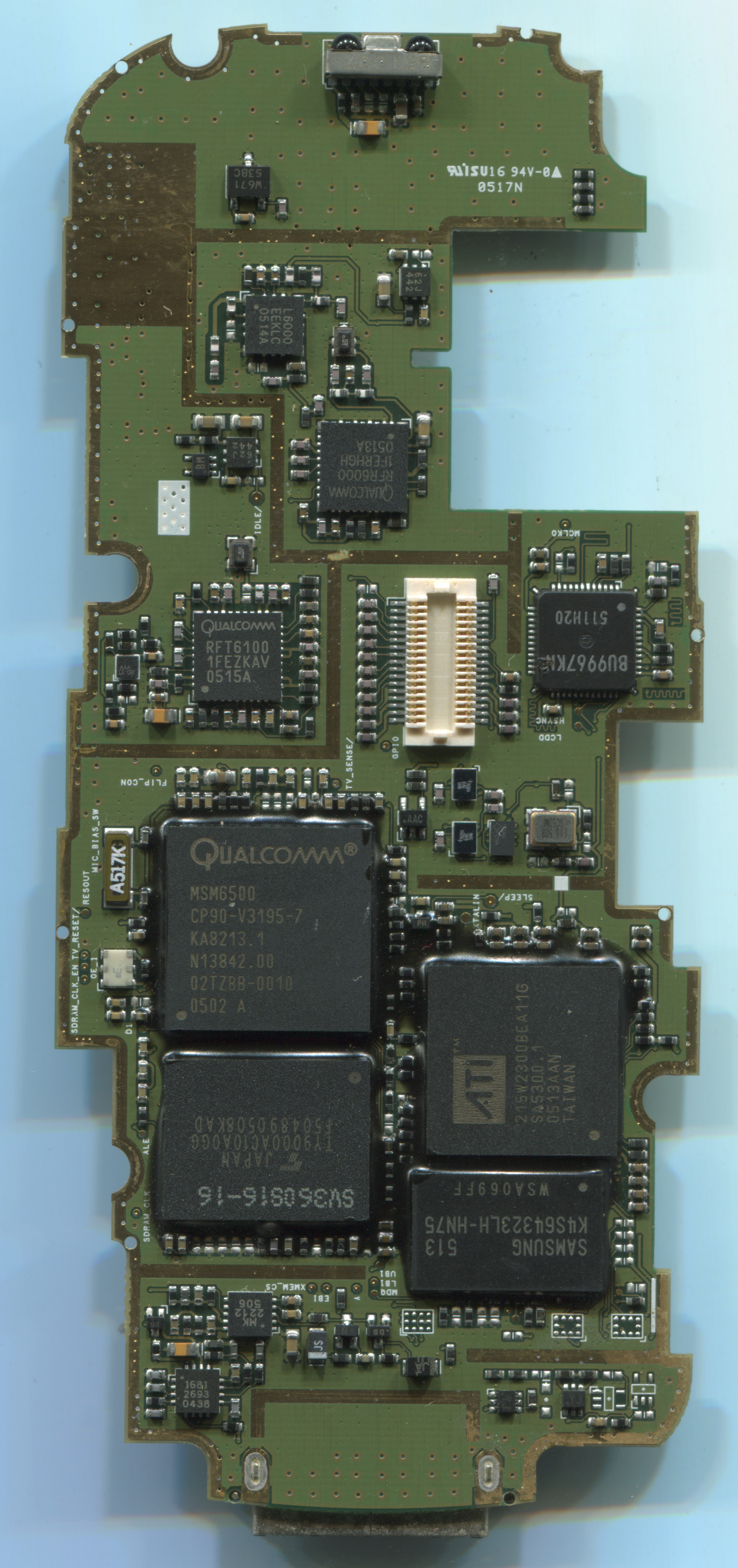
Photo of LG LG SV360 motherboard, showing the ATI Imageon 2300

==== Imageon 2300 ====
Announced in January 2004, the Imageon 2300 introduced full 3D hardware acceleration (100M-pix/sec), in addition to 2MP camera support, and multimedia (MPEG4) playback. Having full hardware 3D support enabled OpenGL ES 1.0 and JSR184 gaming on mobile devices via software engines such as Micro3D by Mascot Capsule.

These chips were used in the LG KV3600, and in the LG SV360, which were marketed as 3D gaming phones "offering a console-like gaming experience and ergonomics".

This model competed primarily with the Intel 2700G and GoForce 4500.

==== Imageon 2282 / 2182 ====
The 2282 and 2182 models were released later on, and enabled additional support for playback of various audio codecs, including AMR, AAC, MP3, Real Audio, WMA and MIDI, as well as support for 3MP camera image sensors. An Imageon 2284 was reportedly used in the HTC X7500, but no details on this model were publicly shared by ATI.

==== Imageon 2380 / 2388 ====
The 2380 and 2388 processors extend the 3D capabilities of the 2300 to support OpenGL ES 1.1+, as well as additional multimedia playback codecs such as MPEG4 H.264, AAC LC and aacPlus.

==== Imageon 2192 ====
Introduced with processing support for up to 3.1MP camera sensors.

==== Imageon TV & Multimedia Processors ====
Imageon TV. Announced in February 2006, as the first Imageon product in the line featuring Digital Video Broadcasting - Handheld (DVB-H) signal receiving support, allowing handhelds devices to receive digital broadcast TV (DVB-H) signals and enables watching TV programs on these devices, the chipset includes tuner, demodulator, decoder, and a full software stack.

In 2008 AMD launched several additional non-3D multimedia processors under the Imageon brand, including the D160 mobile TV decoder, M180 media processor, M210 audio decoder, A250 applications processor, and Z180 vector graphics (OpenVG 1.x) processor.

The A250 applications processor supported 8MP camera sensors, SD video, dual displays, vector graphics and DVB decoding. The M210 audio decoder enabled Multi-band equalizer, Automatic gain control, 99 db signal-to-noise ratio, and supported over 30 audio codecs including MP3, AAC, AAC+, WMA, AC3, DTS, MIDI with SMAF support, 3D audio, MPEG-4 SLS, FLAC, as well as other 3rd party codecs. Claimed energy efficiency of about 33 mW and featuring integrated power management.

==== Imageon M100 ====
The Imageon 2294 and 2298 were multimedia processors, but were later renamed under the Imageon M100 series banner. Current top-of-line product, processor includes DVD quality recording and playback, HD TV output, and supports up to a 12-megapixel camera sensor. Products include Imageon M180.

=== IP Products: Imageon Z4xx Series ===
With the growing trend of consolidating multiple IC components into one SoC, ATI began offered licensing of Imageon 3D graphics IP cores. These products were not provided as separate processors, but were delivered as IP cores for integration within other SoC or Application Processors.

The Imageon Z4xx series was launched in February 2008, with the Z430 and Z460 being the first Imageon graphics processors receiving certification with OpenGL ES 2.0. The Z4xx series was advertised by AMD as being based on the Xenos graphics chip architecture used on the Xbox 360, and was even referred to as the 'mini-Xenos'.

==== Imageon Z4xx Specifications ====
- 3D graphics core
  - OpenGL ES 2.0 support
  - Unified shader model
    - Programmable vertex shaders and pixel shaders
  - Support for WVGA (800×480, 848×480, or 854×480) and qHD (960×540) resolutions
  - Claimed on par with high-end portable game consoles in terms of performance
- Vector graphics core (Imageon Z180)
  - Hardware OpenVG 1.x rendering acceleration
  - Claimed 20-40× faster than software-based implementations
  - Support for HD resolution
  - 16× antialiasing for fonts and vector graphics
  - Flash support for web application
  - Energy efficiency

==== Imageon Z4xx Licensees ====
The Z430 IP was licensed by Freescale and the IP core was synthesized in the i.MX515 application processor from the i.MX 5 series.

The Z430 IP was also licensed by Qualcomm in 2007, to improve the graphics capabilities of their Snapdragon SoC's. The Imageon Z430 was incorporated into the Qualcomm MSM7x27 and QSD8x50 series of processors, being rebranded as the Adreno 200.

The Z460 IP was licensed by STMicroelectronics (later ST-NXP Wireless) in their ARM11 STn8820 'Nomadik' SoC processor in Feb 2008, but as of 2023 no products implementing this SoC have been identified. Following negotiations in June 2008, the later NovaThor processors from ST-Ericsson instead opted to use the Mali graphics core.

=== Sale of Imageon division to Qualcomm ===
In 2009 AMD sold their entire handheld graphics division to Qualcomm for $65 million, transferring all Imageon assets, IP and employees to Qualcomm. As of 2021, Qualcomm continues to produce mobile SoC's with graphics capabilities branded under the Adreno name.

== See also ==
- Adreno - The series of graphics processors developed by Qualcomm, starting from Imageon IP.
- Zeebo - An unspecific Imageon graphics processor was used in the Zeebo game console, launched in 2009.
- Intel 2700G - competing mobile graphics processors
- GoForce - competing mobile graphics processors
- PowerVR
- ARM Mali
