= ST-NXP Wireless =

Joint venture between STMicroelectronics and NXP Semiconductors

ST-NXP Wireless was a joint venture made up of the wireless operations of STMicroelectronics and NXP Semiconductors, existing between 2008 and 2009.

Formerly a division of the semiconductor firm Royal Philips Electronics, NXP was established as an independent company in 2006. STMicroelectronics was formed in June 1987 by the merger of semiconductor companies SGS Microelettronica of Italy and Thomson Semiconductors, the semiconductor arm of France's Thomson.

In April 2008, NXP and STMicroelectronics announced a merger of their wireless chip divisions, to create a joint-venture called ST-NXP Wireless. The merger was intended to combine their wireless operations in 2G, 2.5G, 3G, multimedia, connectivity and future wireless technologies, with both businesses contributing significant portfolios of communication and multimedia patents.

In August 2008, another 50/50 joint-venture was formed between ST-NXP Wireless and Ericsson, and in February 2009, STMicroelectronics purchased NXP's stake in the ST-NXP joint venture, resulting in the formation of ST-Ericsson.

== Products ==
Being intentionally mobile-focused, key products of ST-NXP included the Nomadik smartphone SoC platform, which was inherited from STMicroelectronics in the merger. For example, the Nomadik STn8820 was announced in February 2008, and featured an ARM11 processor, combined with an ATI Imageon Z460 3D graphics accelerator. However, no products are known to have ever used this processor, and the Nomadik name was later retired, with future SoC processors from ST-Ericsson launching instead under the NovaThor brand.

== See also ==
- ARM11
- Nomadik
- NovaThor
