= Samsung Galaxy Beam i8530 =

Samsung smartphone model

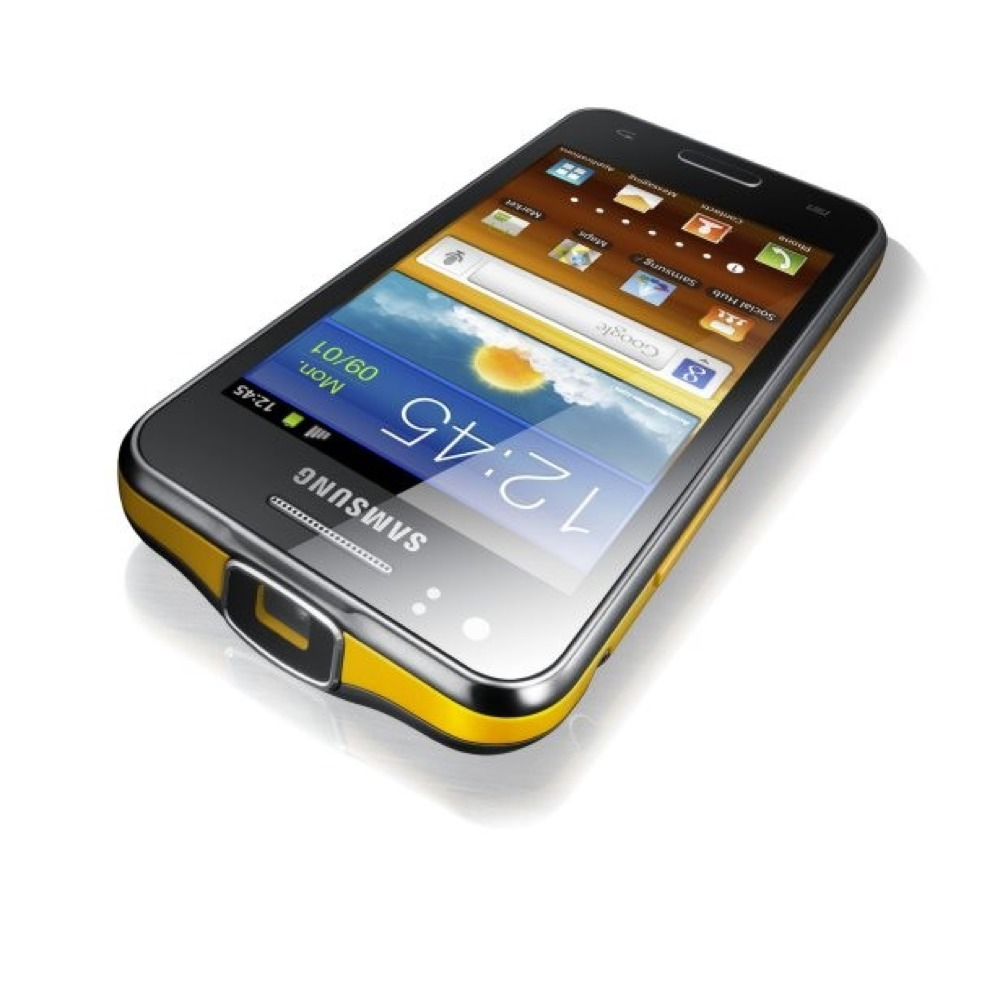
- Manufacturer: Samsung Electronics
- Type: Touchscreen smartphone
- First released: July 2012
- Predecessor: Samsung Galaxy Beam I8520
- Compatible networks: 2G GSM/GPRS/EDGE – 850, 900, 1,800, 1,900 MHz 3G UMTS/HSPA+ – 850, 900, 1,900, 2,100 MHz
- Form factor: Slate
- Dimensions: 124 mm (4.9 in) H 64.2 mm (2.53 in) W 12.5 mm (0.49 in) D
- Weight: 145.3 g (5.13 oz)
- Operating system: Android 2.3.6 "Gingerbread"
- System-on-chip: ST-Ericsson NovaThor U8500
- CPU: 1.0 GHz dual-core Cortex-A9
- GPU: Mali-400 MP
- Memory: 768 MB RAM
- Storage: 8 GB flash memory
- Removable storage: Up to 32 GB microSDHC
- Battery: 2,000 mAh, 7.6 Wh, 3.8 V Internal rechargeable Li-ion; User replaceable
- Rear camera: List: 5.0 megapixels back-side illuminated sensor; LED flash; HD video (720p) at 30 frames/s; Autofocus
- Front camera: 1.3 megapixels Video MPEG-4, H.264, H.263, DivX, DivX3.11, WMV7/8
- Display: List: 4.0 in (100 mm) diagonal with 15:9 aspect ratio widescreen TFT LCD touchscreen; 480x800 pixels (233 ppi); 16M colours
- Connectivity: List: 3.5 millimetres (0.14 in) TRRS; Bluetooth 3.0; Wi-Fi (802.11 a/b/g/n); DLNA; Samsung Kies
- Data inputs: List: Multi-touch capacitive touchscreen; 3 push buttons; aGPS; Gyroscope; Accelerometer; Digital compass
- Codename: Gavini
- Development status: Discontinued
- SAR: Intl version:Head: 0.35 W/kg 1 g Body: 0.7 W/kg 1 g Hotspot: 0.78 W/kg 1 g; US version: 0.36 W/kg (head) 0.78 W/kg (body)
- Other: List: Wi-Fi hotspot, AllShare; Online services Google Play, Samsung Apps, Samsung Music Hub; Available in Black and Yellow color
- Website: www.samsung.com/in/galaxybeam/

The Samsung Galaxy Beam i8530 (model GT-I8530), commonly known as the Galaxy Beam, is an Android smartphone manufactured by Samsung Electronics. It was announced in February 2012 ahead of Mobile World Congress in Barcelona. The phone incorporates a DLP pico projector capable of displaying content from the phone on a wall or other surface.

The projector has a resolution of 640 × 360 pixels and a rated brightness of 15 lumens. Samsung stated that it could produce an image up to 50 in (130 cm) diagonally.

== Release ==
Samsung had previously produced several projector-equipped phones, including the AnyCall W7900, AMOLED Beam W9600 and Galaxy Beam I8520. The i8530 was announced on 26 February 2012, shortly before Mobile World Congress 2012.

Samsung promoted the projector for displaying photographs, videos, games and business material without a separate projector or display.

The phone went on sale in India and the United Kingdom in July 2012. It was available through Samsung's Indian e-store for ₹29,990 by 20 July, and went on sale in the United Kingdom on 30 July. By November, it was also available in France, Singapore and Brazil. The publication also reported that customers in the United States could import an unlocked model with AT&T-compatible 3G.

== Hardware ==
The Galaxy Beam measures 124 mm × 64.2 mm × 12.5 mm (4.88 in × 2.53 in × 0.49 in) and weighs approximately 145 g (5.1 oz). The projector is housed in the upper edge of the phone. The handset reviewed by Engadget had a black textured rear cover with yellow trim; a white-and-grey version was also available in some markets.

The phone has a 4.0-inch TFT LCD with a resolution of 800 × 480 pixels. It uses the ST-Ericsson NovaThor U8500 system on a chip, with a 1 GHz dual-core ARM Cortex-A9 processor and Mali-400 graphics. It includes 768 MB of RAM and 8 GB of internal storage, with support for microSDHC cards of up to 32 GB.

The rear camera has a resolution of 5 megapixels, autofocus and an LED flash, and can record 720p video at 30 frames per second. A 1.3-megapixel front-facing camera is also included. Connectivity includes quad-band GSM/EDGE, HSPA, Wi-Fi 802.11b/g/n, Bluetooth 3.0, Micro-USB and a 3.5 mm headphone jack.

The phone uses a removable 2,000 mAh battery. Notebookcheck recorded slightly more than three hours of continuous projector operation in its testing, while Engadget recorded approximately four hours while repeatedly projecting a slideshow.

== Projector ==
The Galaxy Beam uses a Texas Instruments DLP pico projector with a resolution of 640 × 360 pixels and a rated output of 15 lumens. Samsung specified a projected image size of up to 50 in (130 cm) at a distance of approximately 2 m (6.6 ft).

The projector can display content from the phone, including applications, photographs, video and games. A dedicated projector button provides access to a menu for adjusting the focal length and image rotation and for opening Quick Pad.

Samsung included several projector-specific functions. Quick Pad provides a pointer and drawing tools for projected content. Visual Presenter activates the rear camera and projector simultaneously, allowing the phone to be used in a manner similar to an overhead projector. Ambience mode can display images or video together with audio, while Briefing mode can automatically activate the projector at a specified time and display information such as weather or a daily schedule. A torch mode projects one of several solid colors.

The projector performed best in dark surroundings. GSMArena found that a very dark room was necessary to obtain a clearly visible 50-inch image at a distance of two metres, while smaller projections could be used in brighter conditions by moving the phone closer to the projection surface. Notebookcheck similarly found the projector effective in darkened rooms but poor in bright surroundings. Business Today reported that the projected image was bright and clear in a dark room but deteriorated when ambient light was introduced.

== Software ==
The Galaxy Beam shipped with Android 2.3 "Gingerbread" and Samsung's TouchWiz 4.0 interface. A dedicated projector application provided additional settings and access to projector-specific functions.

The use of Gingerbread was criticized in contemporary reviews because newer versions of Android were already available by the time the phone reached the market. In November 2012, Samsung told Engadget that an update to Android "Jelly Bean" was planned, but did not give a release date.

== Reception ==
Reviews generally regarded the projector more favorably than the phone's conventional hardware.

GSMArena found the projector suitable for casual media sharing, but said that its low brightness and resolution limited its usefulness as a work tool. The publication also questioned whether the projector justified the price premium over smartphones with otherwise similar specifications.

Notebookcheck described the Galaxy Beam as a good mid-range smartphone and regarded the projector as a useful feature. It criticized the low brightness of the phone's display and the use of the older Android 2.3 operating system, and concluded that the recommended price of €539 was too high.

Engadget described the Galaxy Beam as being at the lower end of the mid-range, citing its 1 GHz dual-core processor, outdated operating system, display and 5-megapixel camera. It found that the projector worked well for displaying media, but concluded that the phone was primarily suited to users who valued the projector enough to accept compromises in other areas.

Business Today found that the phone's projector and smartphone functions worked well together but considered it unsuitable for professional projection.

== Successor ==
Samsung introduced the Galaxy Beam 2 (model SM-G3858) in China in April 2014. The phone used a 1.2 GHz quad-core processor, 1 GB of RAM and a WVGA display, and retained a built-in pico projector. Engadget reported a 4.66-inch display and a 2,600 mAh battery. The phone launched on China Mobile's 3G network.

== See also ==
- Projector phone
- Handheld projector
