= Samsung Gravity Q =

Phone with QWERTY keypad

- Brand: Samsung
- Manufacturer: Samsung Electronics
- Type: Feature phone
- Series: Samsung Gravity
- First released: United States July 2, 2013 (T-Mobile)
- Compatible networks: GSM quad-band, UMTS (3G) Bands 2, 4, 5
- Form factor: Side-sliding QWERTY
- Dimensions: 113 mm × 60 mm × 14 mm (4.45 in × 2.36 in × 0.55 in)
- Weight: 119 g (4.2 oz)
- CPU: 416 MHz ST-Ericsson U6805-Core
- Memory: 128 MB RAM
- Storage: 256 MB ROM
- Removable storage: microSDHC up to 32 GB
- Battery: 1,000 mAh Li-ion (removable)
- Rear camera: 2.0 MP
- Display: 3.0 in (76 mm) TFT LCD; 320 x 240 pixels (133 ppi)
- Connectivity: Bluetooth 2.1 + EDR, Micro-USB, 3.5 mm headphone jack Carrier: T-Mobile
- Model: SGH-T289
- SAR: Head: 0.96 W/kg; Body: 0.81 W/kg

The Samsung Gravity Q is a feature phone that was manufactured and branded by Samsung. It was released in July 2013 by T-Mobile, featuring a touchscreen and a side-sliding QWERTY keypad.

== Features ==
- 2-megapixel camera
- 3-inch TFT display
- 416 MHz U6805 CPU
- microSC up to 32GB
- QWERTY keypad (side-sliding)

== Reception ==
Due to small display as noticed by PCMag Australia reviewer, Rob Pegoraro, the 3-inch display makes users unfavorable in browsing with the Web Browser. In terms of camera, the 2-megapixel camera produced "grainy and ill-exposed" pictures despite the softness of the picture.

PhoneArena reviewer John Velasco noticed low quality display, which causes their eyes to "squirt in pain" while looking. Aside from browsing, it was consisdered as a negative feature, stating "You’ll want to stay far away from accessing the handset’s web browser, mainly due to the fact that it’s pointless to use with complex sites. First, it takes forever to load them. Secondly, navigational controls are so delayed that the experience simply becomes a test in futility."
