= Projector phone =

Mobile phone with a projector

A projector phone is a mobile phone that contains a built-in pico projector.

== List of projector phones ==
Model	Release	Availability	Projector technology
Logic Bolt V1.0 Prototype	May 2008	USA	640x480 LCOS 10 Lumens
Logic Bolt V1.0	January 2009	USA	640x480 LCOS 10 Lumens
Logic Bolt V1.5	October 2009	USA	640x480 LCOS 12 Lumens
Samsung Show / Samsung SPH-W7900 / Samsung Haptic Beam / Samsung i7410	August 2009	South Korea & Europe	480x320, 10 lumens, max image 50"
LG eXpo	December 2009	N/A	480x320, max image 40", 6 Lumens
Samsung AMOLED Beam / Samsung SPH-W9600	January 2010	South Korea	854x480, 15 lumens, max image 50"
Fujitsu / NTT DoCoMo F-04B	March 2010	Japan	854x480, 6 lumens
The Mighty	March 2010	China	640x480, max image 32"
Samsung Beam (Halo) i8520	July 2010	Singapore	800x480, 9 lumens
Intex V.Show IN 8810	November 2010	India	
Techberry ST200	December 2010	India	
VOX Mobile Q8	December 2010	India	
NTT DoCoMo SH-05C	January 2011	Japan	640×360, 9 lumens
Techberry ST100	February 2011	India	
Spice Popkorn Projector M9000	March 2011	India	
Intex V.Show Mini Theater IN 8809	March 2011	India	
G'Five G5	April 2011	India	
Videocon V4500	May 2011	India	
Micromax X40	August 2011	India	
Maxx Focus MTP9	December 2011	India	
Samsung Galaxy Beam i8530	July 2012	Global	360x640, 15 lumens
iBall Andi4a Projector	September 2013	India	640x480, 15 lumens
Akyumen Hawk V1.0 Projector Phone	October 2013	Global	480P HD, 20 Lumens
Akyumen Falcon V1.0 Projector Tablet	October 2013	Global	480P HD. 30 Lumens
ZFT K999	January 2014	China	
VVE We1	February 2014	China	DLP HD, 35 lumens, 30-150" image size
Samsung Galaxy Beam 2	April 2014	China	800x480, 20 lumens
VVE We8	2014	China	854x480, 45 lumens
Magicon Ayane QS4	April 2014	India	640x480, 35 lumens
Akyumen Hawk V2.0 Projector Phone	January 2016	Global	DLP HD 35 Lumens
Akyumen Falcon EDU Projector Tablet	January 2016	Global	DLP HD 35 Lumens
Akyumen Holofone Projector Phablet	February 2016	Global	DLP HD 35 Lumens
Akyumen Falcon M Projector Tablet	February 2016	Global	DLP HD 45 Lumens
Motorola Moto Z + Insta-Share Projector mod	September 2016	Global	480x854, 50 lumens, max 70” image
Ragentek Voga V	October 2017	China	MEMS laser, 720x1280, 50 lumens (MicroVision, Inc. PicoP PSE-0403-103)
VVETIME VM3	December 2017	China	DLP WVGA, 100 lumens, 30-100" image size, RGB LED
Blackview Max 1	February 2018	China	MEMS laser, 720x1280, 50 lumens, 0-200" image size (MicroVision PicoP PSE-0403-103)
Akyumen Hawk V3.0 Projector Phone	January 2021	Made in USA, Available: Global	DLP HD 60 Lumens
Akyumen Falcon V3.0 Projector Tablet	January 2021	Made in USA, Available: Global	DLP HD 90 Lumens
Unihertz 8849 TANK 2 / TANK 2 Pro	June 2023	Global	MEMS laser, 720x1280, 40 lumens
Oukitel WP100 Titan	February 2025		
Ulefone Armor 34 Pro, Ulefone Armor 34 Pro+	June 2025		
8849 TANK 3 Pro	2024		
8849 TANK 4 Pro			
8849 TANK X			
8849 TANK 5 / TANK 5 Pro			
Blackview Xplore 2 Projector			
Doogee V Max Play			
ShenZhen SWELL DX9			

== See also ==
- List of 3D-enabled mobile phones
- List of NFC-enabled mobile devices
