= Calao =

Calao may refer to:

- Calão language, a former name for the Caló language
- Calao River, a river in Luzon, Philippines
- Calao Systems, a defunct USB key manufacturer
- Calao, the French term for hornbill, as in Hornbill ivory
- Citroën Calao, a 1998 Citroën concept car, based on the Berlingo concept car
