= Samsung Beam i8520 =

Samsung smartphone

- Manufacturer: Samsung
- Availability by region: July 2010
- Successor: Samsung Galaxy Beam I8530
- Compatible networks: HSDPA (3.5G), Quad band GSM / GPRS / EDGE GSM 850, GSM 900, GSM 1800, GSM 1900
- Form factor: Candybar
- Dimensions: 123×59.8×14.9 mm (4.84×2.35×0.59 in)
- Weight: 156 g (6 oz)
- Operating system: Android OS, v2.1 (Eclair)
- System-on-chip: TI OMAP 3440
- CPU: 720 MHz ARM Cortex-A8
- GPU: PowerVR SGX530
- Memory: 384 MB RAM, 512 MB ROM, 16 GB internal, microSD expandable up to 32 GB
- Removable storage: microSD, microSDHC
- Battery: Standard battery, Li-Ion 1800 mAh
- Rear camera: 8 megapixels (3264×2448), autofocus, image stabiliser, video (720p@30 frame/s), LED flash, camera geo-tagging, auto-panorama shot, face, smile and blink detection
- Front camera: VGA video call (front)
- Display: 480×800 px, 3.7 in (252 ppi), Super AMOLED capacitive touchscreen, 16M colours
- Connectivity: microUSB 2.0, Bluetooth 3.0 with A1DP, Wi-Fi 802.11b/g/n
- Data inputs: Touchscreen
- SAR: 0.62 W/kg

The Samsung i8520 (also known as Beam, or previously Halo) is a projector-enabled smartphone produced by Samsung. Its main feature is a built-in DLP WVGA projector that is able to project images at up to 50 inches (1,300 mm) in size at 15 lumens. The i8520 also contains an 8-megapixel camera, that can be used along with the projector to allow the user to project directly what is in front of the camera (similar to the action of an overhead projector). The camera is also able to record HD video at a resolution of 720p at 30 frame/s. The phone also offers local Wi-Fi connectivity, e-mail, and web browsing, as well as containing a built-in GPS receiver. It was released initially in Singapore on 17 July 2010 with the carrier StarHub.

== Successor ==
In February 2012 the i8530 Galaxy Beam was presented at the Mobile World Congress in Barcelona. It has a 15 lumens projector inside and 8GB of internal memory. the phone is 12.5mm thick and weighs 145.3 grams. It will run Google's Android 2.3 Gingerbread OS, has a 1.0 GHz dual-core processor. An update to the newer version of Android 4.0 a.k.a. Ice Cream Sandwich is planned.

== Other features ==
- 3.5 mm audio jack
- Integrated DNSe (Digital Natural Sound Engine)
- Social networking integration with live updates
- Google Search, Maps, Gmail
- YouTube, Google Talk integration
- MP3/WMA/WAV/eAAC+ player
- MP4/H.263/H.264/Xvid/DivX player
- Image editor
- TV out
- Organizer
- Voice memo
- T9

== See also ==
- Handheld projector
- Projector phone
