= LG eXpo =

Projector-enabled mobile phone

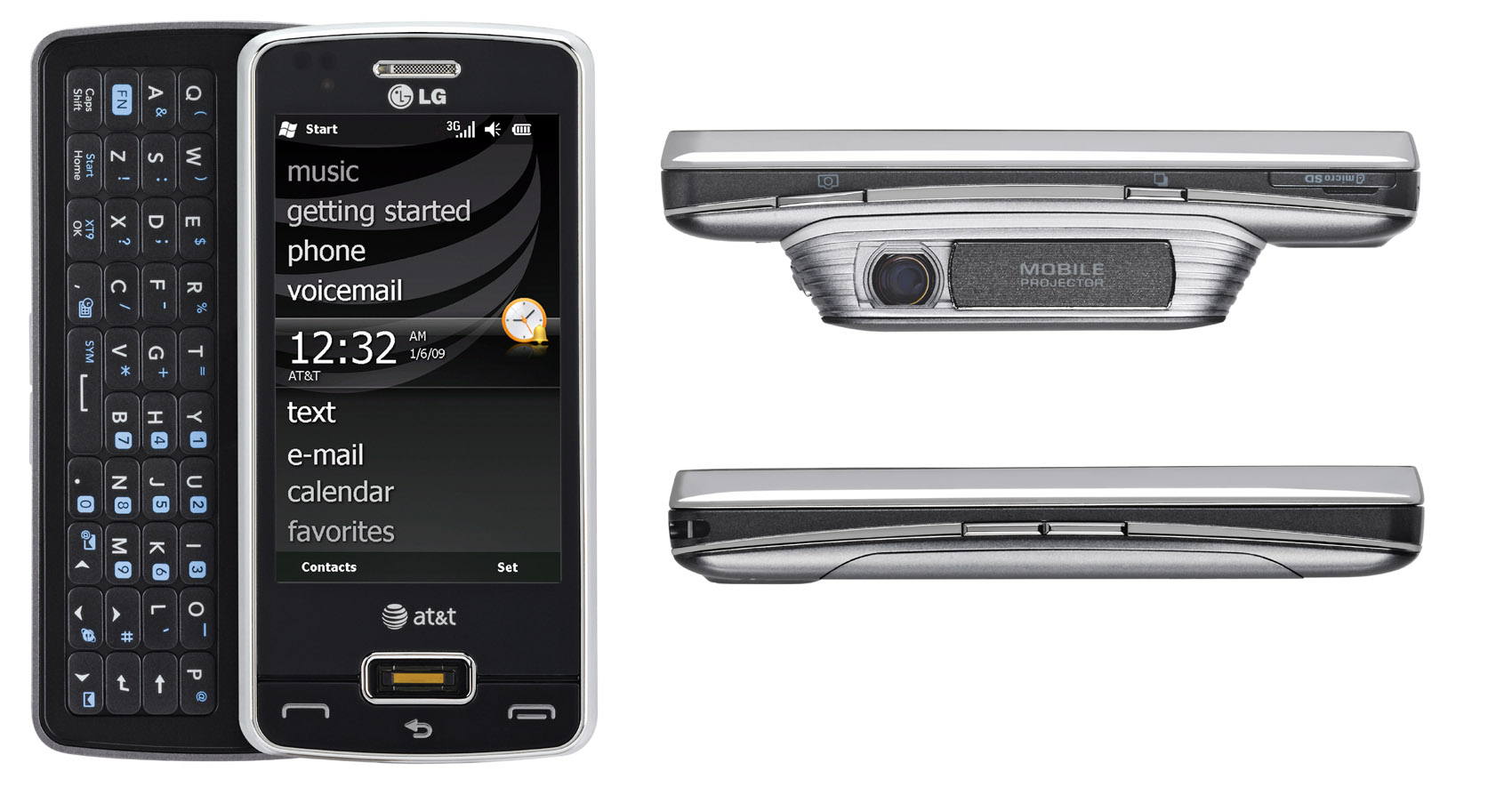
- Manufacturer: LG Electronics
- Type: Slider phone
- Released: December 2009
- Operating system: Windows Mobile 6.5
- CPU: 1 GHz Qualcomm QSD8250 Snapdragon
- Memory: 256 MB RAM / 512 MB ROM
- Storage: microSD/microSDHC
- Display: 3.2" Resistive screen, 480 x 800 pixels (WVGA). Also a projector attachment.
- Input: Stylus pen, QWERTY keyboard, fingerprint sensor
- Camera: 5-megapixel with LED flash
- Connectivity: HTML, WAP 2.0, USB, 802.11b/g, Bluetooth
- Power: Li-Po, 1500 mAh
- Dimensions: 113 x 55 x 16 mm
- Weight: 147 grams / 5.20 oz

LG eXpo (GW820) also known as LG GW820 is a projector-enabled mobile phone designed for business users, and manufactured by LG Electronics. It runs Microsoft's Windows Mobile operating system, and was released in December 2009.

The phone features a 3.2 inch resistive screen, which is operated by holding a stylus pen. It boasts a crisp screen with pixel density of 291.5 ppi (diagonal) which is very close to with iPhone 4's retina display at 329.6 ppi (diagonal). It has a fingerprint sensor which acts as D-pad and omits the need to input password as well as instil extra security for business users. The stylus is stored externally, in a cylindrical container with a cap. It is the first mobile phone to feature a handheld projector.
