= Sony Xperia Go =

Smartphone developed by Sony

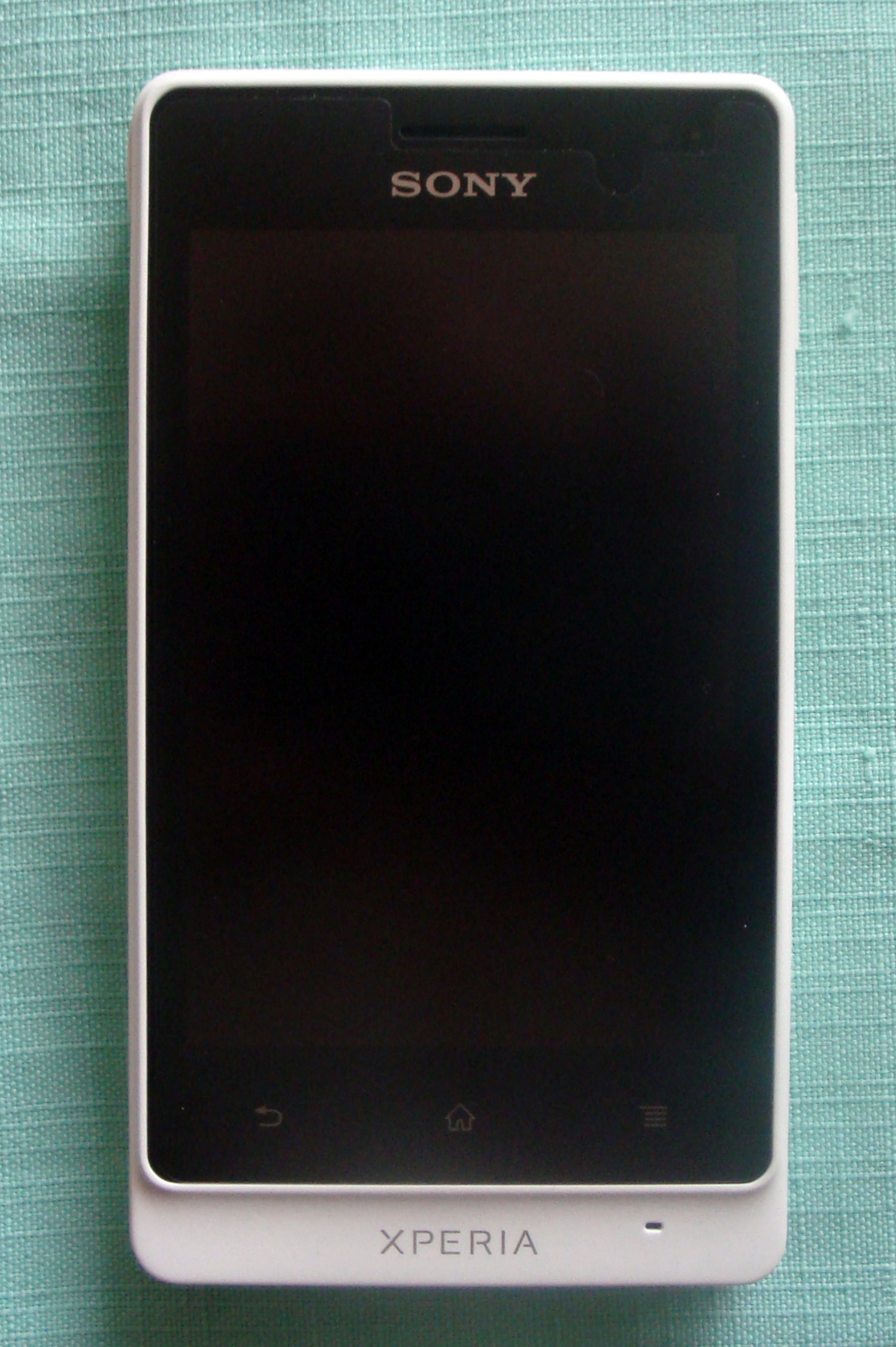
- "Made to Resist"
- Brand: Sony
- Manufacturer: Sony Mobile
- Type: Smartphone
- Series: Xperia
- Predecessor: Sony Ericsson Xperia active
- Successor: Sony Xperia tipo
- Related: Sony Xperia sola Sony Xperia U
- Form factor: Slate
- Dimensions: 111×60.3×9.8 mm (4.37×2.37×0.39 in)
- Weight: 110 g (4 oz)
- Operating system: Android 2.3.7 "Gingerbread", 4.0.4 "Ice Cream Sandwich, Upgradeable to Android 4.1.2 "Jelly Bean"; Unofficial upgrade to Android 4.4.4 ("KitKat") via XDA
- System-on-chip: ST-Ericsson NovaThor U8500
- CPU: 1 GHz dual core
- GPU: Mali 400
- Memory: 512 MB
- Storage: 8 GB
- Removable storage: Up to 32 GB using microSD cards
- Battery: 1305 mAh, stand by time up to 520 h (2G), up to 460 h (3G), talk time up to 6 h 60 min (2G), up to 5 h 36 min (3G)
- Rear camera: 5 MPx, 720p video recording @ 30 frames/s 16x Digital Zoom, autofocus, LED flash, face and smile detection, Panorama and geo-tagging
- Front camera: No
- Display: 3.5-inch HVGA (480x320 pixels) (165 ppi); 16,777,216 colour TFT; Bravia Engine
- Connectivity: 3G HSDPA up to 14.4 Mb/s, HSUPA up to 5.76 Mb/s Wi-Fi 802.11 b/g/n with Hotspot + Wi-Fi Direct, micro-USB v2.0 with USB OTG support, DLNA
- Data inputs: 3-axis accelerometer, Multi-Touch touchscreen, AK8975 Orientation sensor, headset controls, barometer, a-GPS, Gravity sensor & stereo FM radio
- Other: IP67 certified, water-resistant and dust-resistant (up to 1 meter for 30 minutes)
- References: http://www.sonymobile.com/global-en/products/phones/xperia-go/

The Sony Xperia Go, also known as ST27i, is a mid-range smartphone developed by Sony. The Xperia Go is IP67-certified, enabling water-resistance and dust-resistance (up to 1 meter for 30 minutes). It has a 3.5-inch HVGA capacitive display with multi-touch support and Sony Mobile Bravia engine. The phone is equipped with a 5 megapixel rear-facing camera capable of shooting up to HD videos and capturing high-resolution stills with autofocus and LED flash. The Xperia Go is powered by a ST-Ericsson NovaThor U8500 SoC with 1 GHz dual core CPU and Mali-400 MP1 GPU. It has 8 GB of internal storage (4 GB system-reserved + 4 GB usable) that can be further expandable up to 32 GB using microSD cards.

It ships with Android 2.3 Gingerbread, preloaded with an official OTA (Over The Air) upgrade to Android 4.0. It received Android 4.1.2 Jelly Bean on 24 April 2013 after a 1 month delay by Sony.

The Sony Xperia Go has limited amount RAM available for running applications, so the system frequently needs to swap out data to disk.
