= Motorola Defy =

Android smartphone developed by Motorola Mobility

Motorola Defy A8210
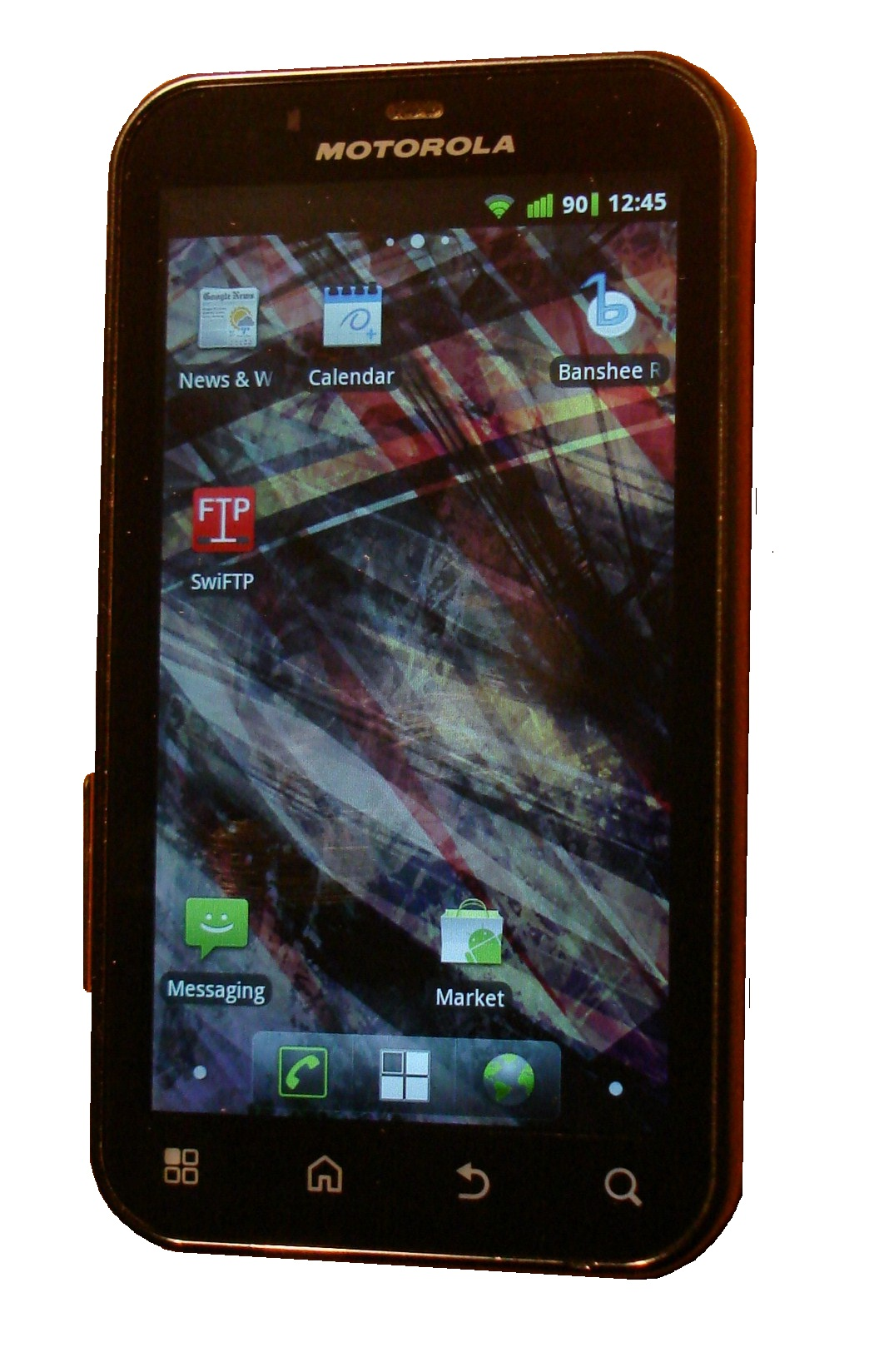
- Manufacturer: Motorola Mobility
- Type: Smartphone
- First released: 3 November 2010; 15 years ago
- Successor: Motorola Defy Plus; Motorola Defy (2021)
- Compatible networks: Quad band GSM with GPRS/EDGE (850/900/1800/1900 MHz in all regions); Dual band UMTS with HSPA+/HSUPA (850/1700/2100 MHz in the USA, 900/2100 MHz in Europe, and 850/2100 MHz in Australia, New Zealand and Thailand)
- Form factor: Slate
- Dimensions: 4.21 in (107 mm) H 2.32 in (59 mm) W 0.53 in (13 mm) D
- Weight: 118.0 g (4.16 oz)
- Operating system: Android 2.1-update1, 2.2.1, 2.2.2, 2.3.4 (beta) with enhanced Motoblur; 4.0.3 Ice Cream Sandwich (CyanogenMod) & MIUI; 4.1.2 ,4.2.1 Jelly Bean (CyanogenMod); 4.4 KitKat(CyanogenMod)
- CPU: 800 MHz TI OMAP3610-800 (or OMAP3630-800)
- GPU: PowerVR SGX 530
- Memory: 512 MB RAM
- Storage: 2 GB, internal storage (approx. 1.2 GB available)
- Removable storage: microSDHC supports up to 32 GB
- Battery: 1,540 mAh internal rechargeable Li-ion (replaceable)
- Rear camera: 5 megapixel (2,560 × 1,920); LED flash
- Display: 3.7 in (94 mm) S-TFT FWVGA 854×480 px using Gorilla Glass
- Data inputs: Capacitive touchscreen display
- SAR: 1.52 W/kg (head); 1.53 W/kg (body)
- Other: Built-in FM radio (requires headset/headphones cable to be plugged into the audio jack to function, as this cable serves as antenna)

The Motorola Defy (A8210/MB525) is an Android-based smartphone from Motorola. It filled a niche market segment, by being one of the few small, IP67 rated smartphones available at the time of its late 2010 release; it is water resistant, dust resistant, and has an impact-resistant screen. An updated version of the original model, Defy+ (MB526) was released in 2011. Other variants were also released before a revival of the Defy name in 2021.

== Description ==
The phone is a bar format with a touch screen and four Android touch buttons on the front. It has Wi-Fi (IEEE 802.11b-1999, IEEE 802.11g-2003, IEEE 802.11n-2009), 5-megapixel camera with LED flash, speakerphone, 800 MHz TI OMAP3630 processor, a 3.7 in (9.4 cm) FWVGA LCD. Lacking a physical keyboard, the phone instead provides the Swype virtual keyboard and an alternative multi-touch QWERTY keyboard. The Defy shares its platform with Motorola Bravo though there are minor differences in exterior design, 3G band, lower resolution camera without LED flash and non-weather resistance. The Defy is "water-resistant" with all covers closed (battery, USB, and audio jack).

The phone was launched unlocked in Germany, France, Italy, Hungary, India, Thailand, Spain, the UK, Turkey, Romania and Greece under various networks and was distributed exclusively by a number of carriers, including T-Mobile in the United States, Telus in Canada, and Telstra and Optus in Australia.

== Hardware ==
The Defy CPU/GPU is TI OMAP3 architecture OMAP3630 and the PowerVR SGX530. The OMAP 3 is the industry's first 45-nm CMOS processor set at 800 MHz in ARM Cortex-A8 superscalar microprocessor core. Under-clocked CPU frequencies (below ARM manufacturer specs of 1 GHz) & high CPU voltage levels on the stock phone led to much lower performance and battery life on stock settings than the hardware is capable of. This can be modified on rooted phones, using 3rd party tools (e.g. SetVSel app) or custom ROMs, with stable performance over 1 GHz being common.

A minor hardware change and possible hardware refresh on MB526 models was observed, mainly noticeable by the camera lens being red ('Bayer' camera), instead of green.

== Gallery ==
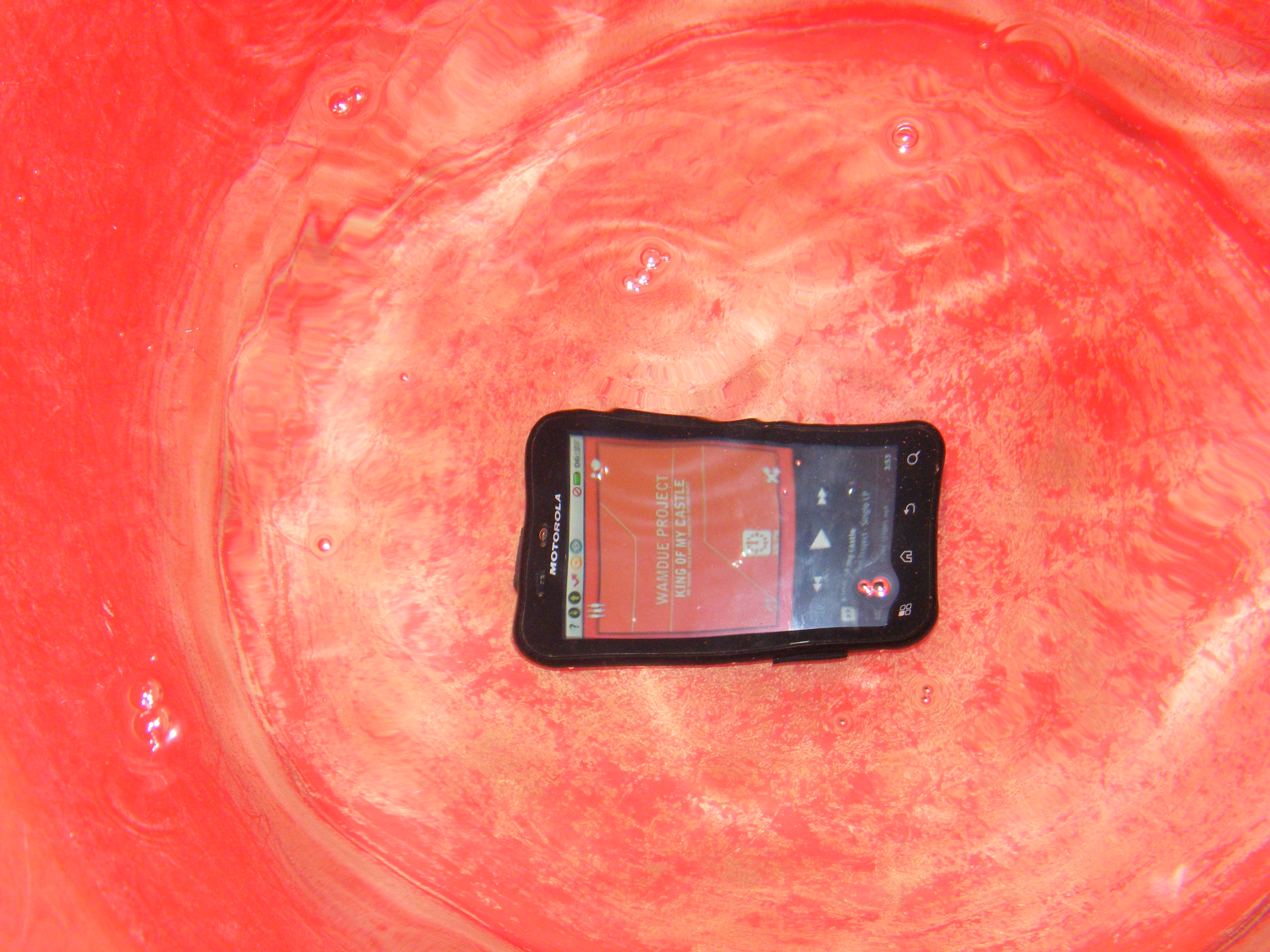
Defy submerged in water

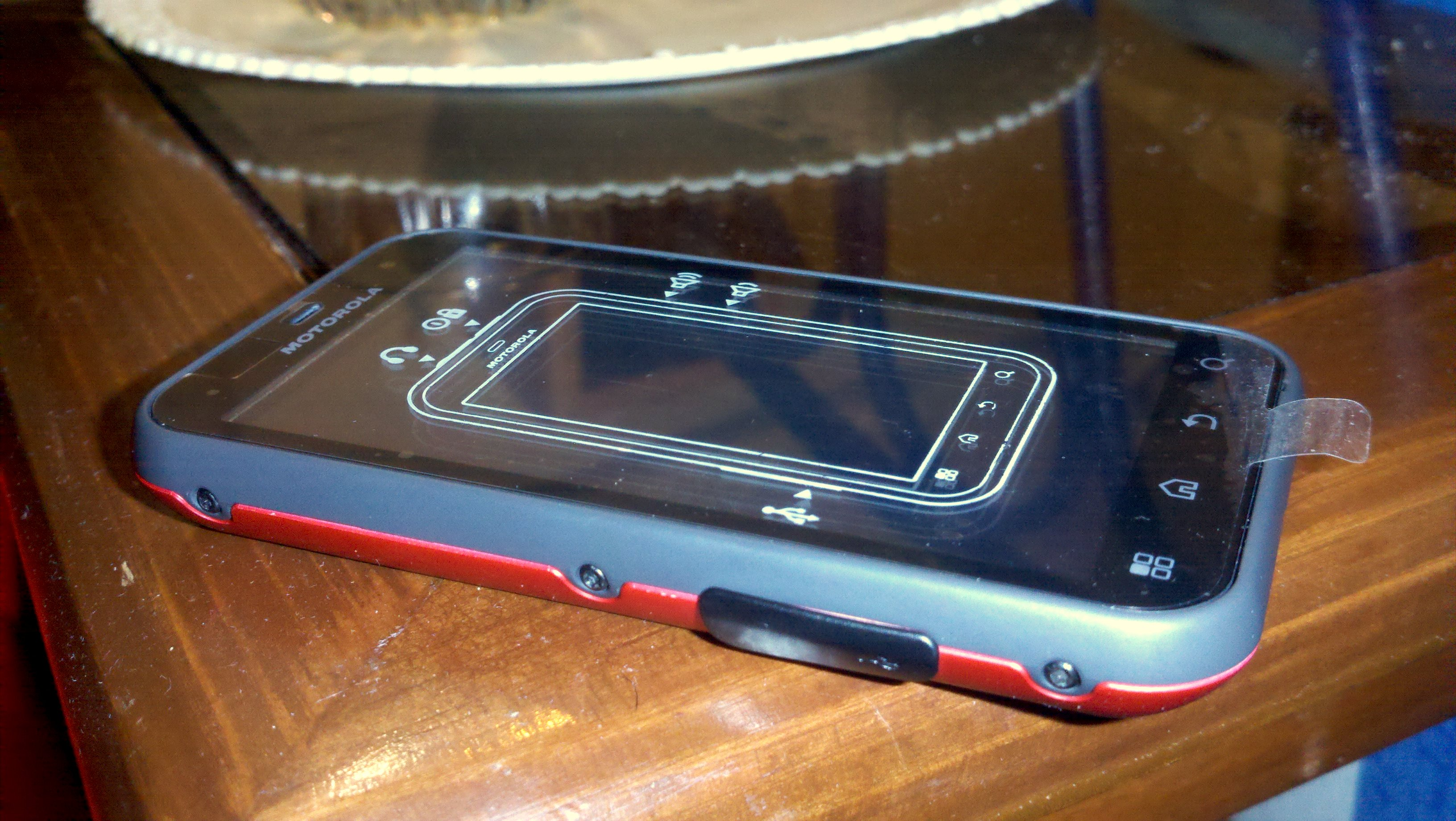
Defy red

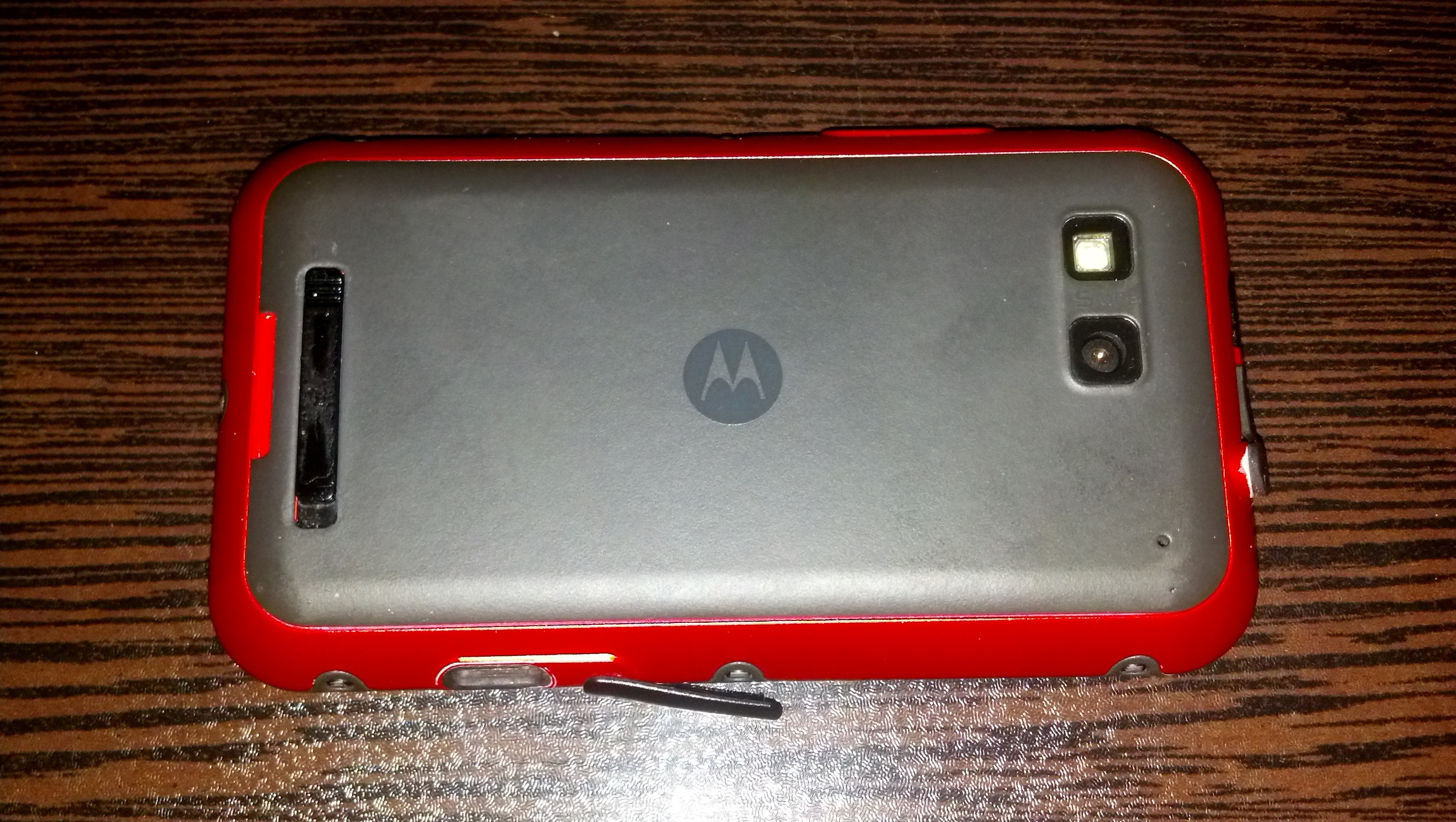
Defy red back

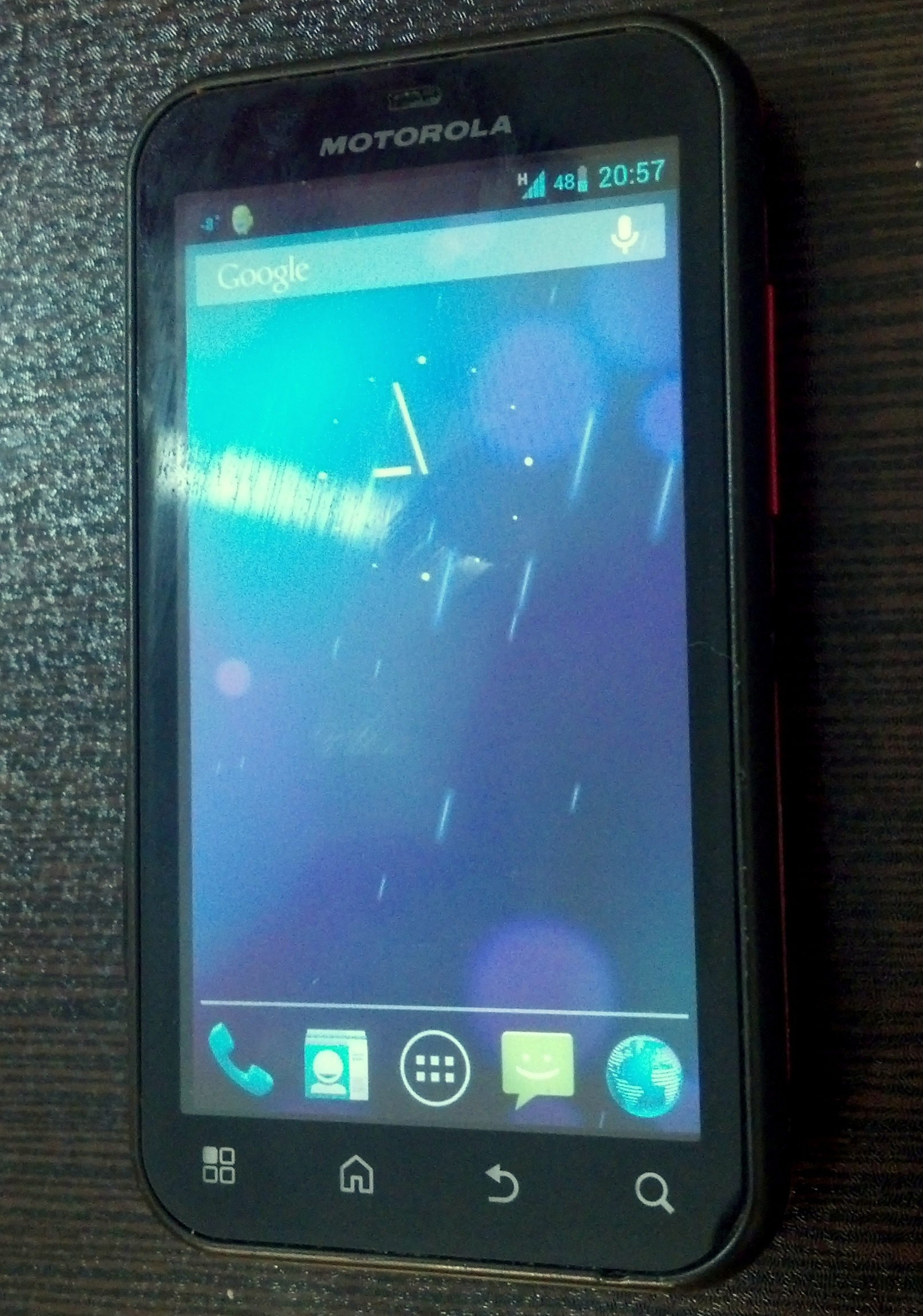
Defy runs under Jelly bean (4.1.2)

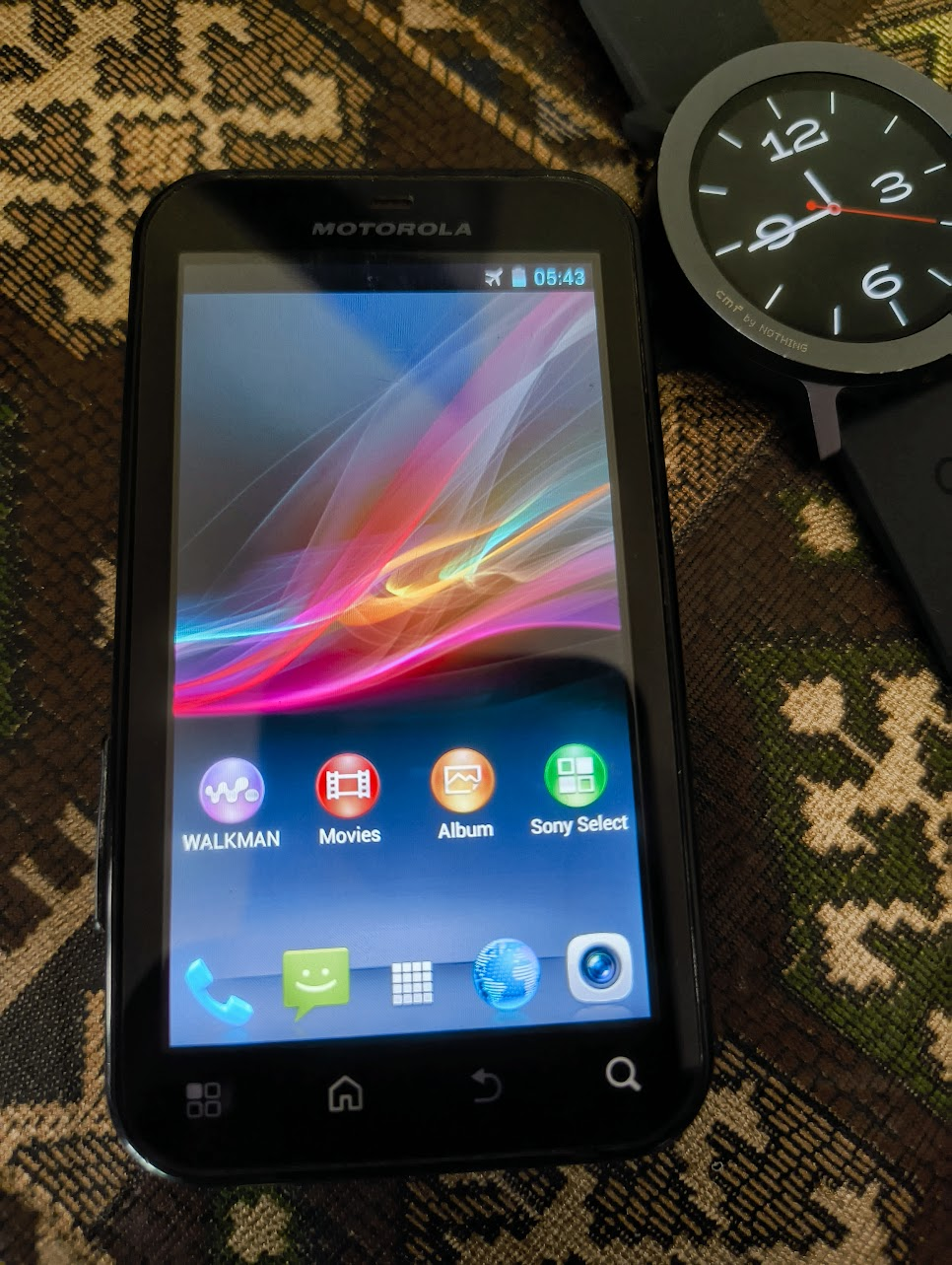
Motorola Defy running Xperia D, a custom CyanogenMod ROM based on Android 4.2 (Jelly Bean)

== Defy+, XT, Mini, Pro ==
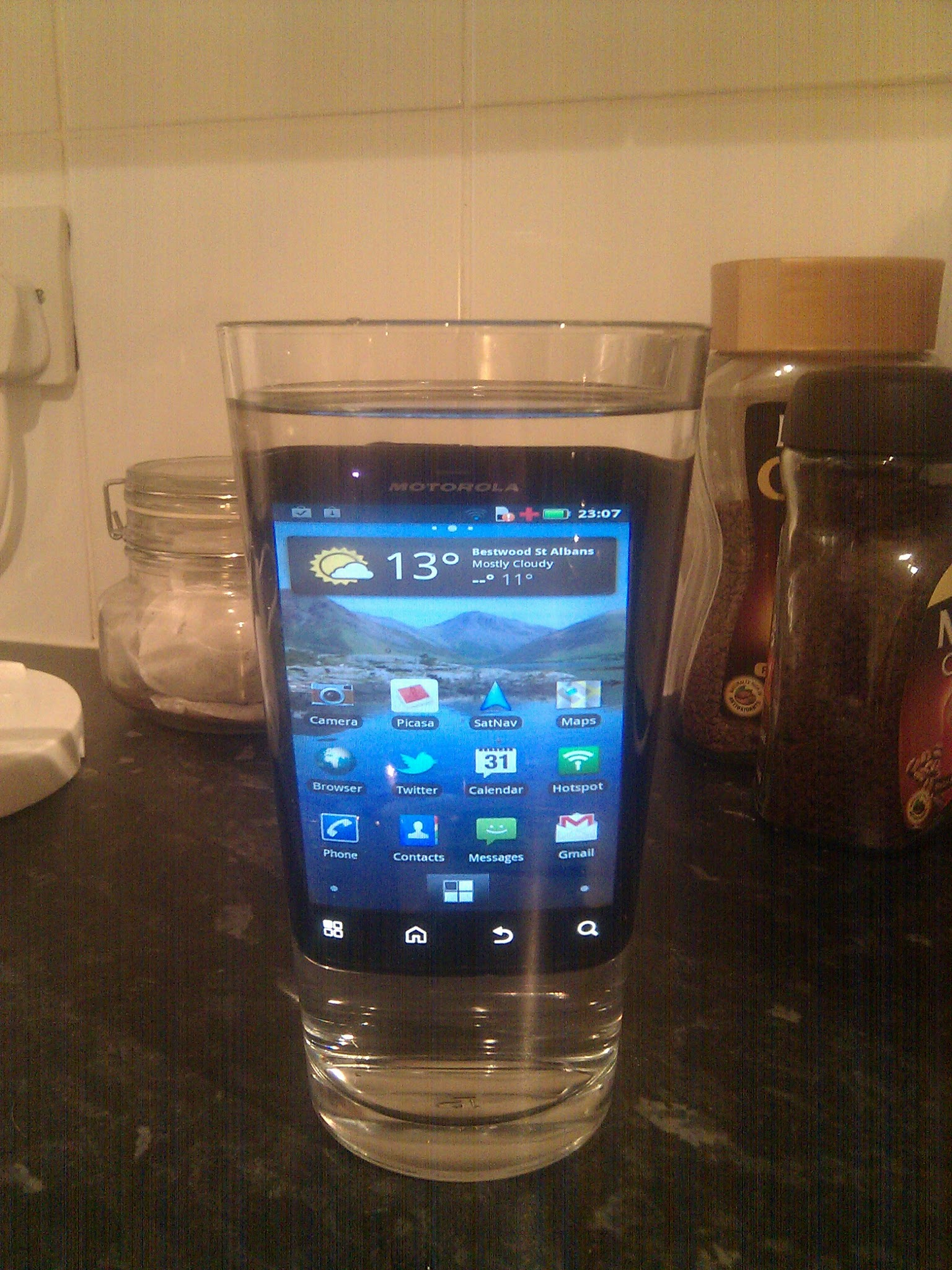
Motorola Defy Plus in a glass of water

Three variant/successor models: Motorola Defy Plus, Motorola Defy XT and Motorola Defy Mini, all with the same IP67 rating, have been released. The Defy Plus released in August 2011 uses a 1 GHz processor setting by default, a higher resolution camera and a 1700 mAh battery.

The Defy Mini (2012) variation uses a 600 MHz CPU in ARM Cortex-A5 microprocessor core, 512 MiB RAM, Adreno 200 Enhanced GPU at 200 MHz with a Qualcomm MSM architecture, MSM7225A chipset and a 3.2 inch screen, with a 320x480 resolution (180 dpi). The Mini is targeted at the low-end category of smartphones.

The Defy XT variation uses a 1 GHz CPU in ARM Cortex-A5 microprocessor core, 512 MiB RAM, Adreno 200 Enhanced GPU at 245 MHz with a Qualcomm MSM architecture, MSM7627A chipset and a 3.7 inch screen, with an 854x480 resolution (245 dpi). The Defy XT is targeted at the mid-range category of smartphones.

The Defy Pro is a QWERTY keyboard variant.

== Defy (2021) and Defy 2 ==
Ten years after its last rugged phone, a new Motorola Defy was introduced in 2021, also running Android and IP68 certified. A successor was released in 2022 called Defy 2, featuring Bullitt Satellite texting.

== See also ==
- Galaxy Nexus
- Samsung Galaxy Xcover
- Sony Ericsson Xperia active
