= Snowball (single-board computer) =

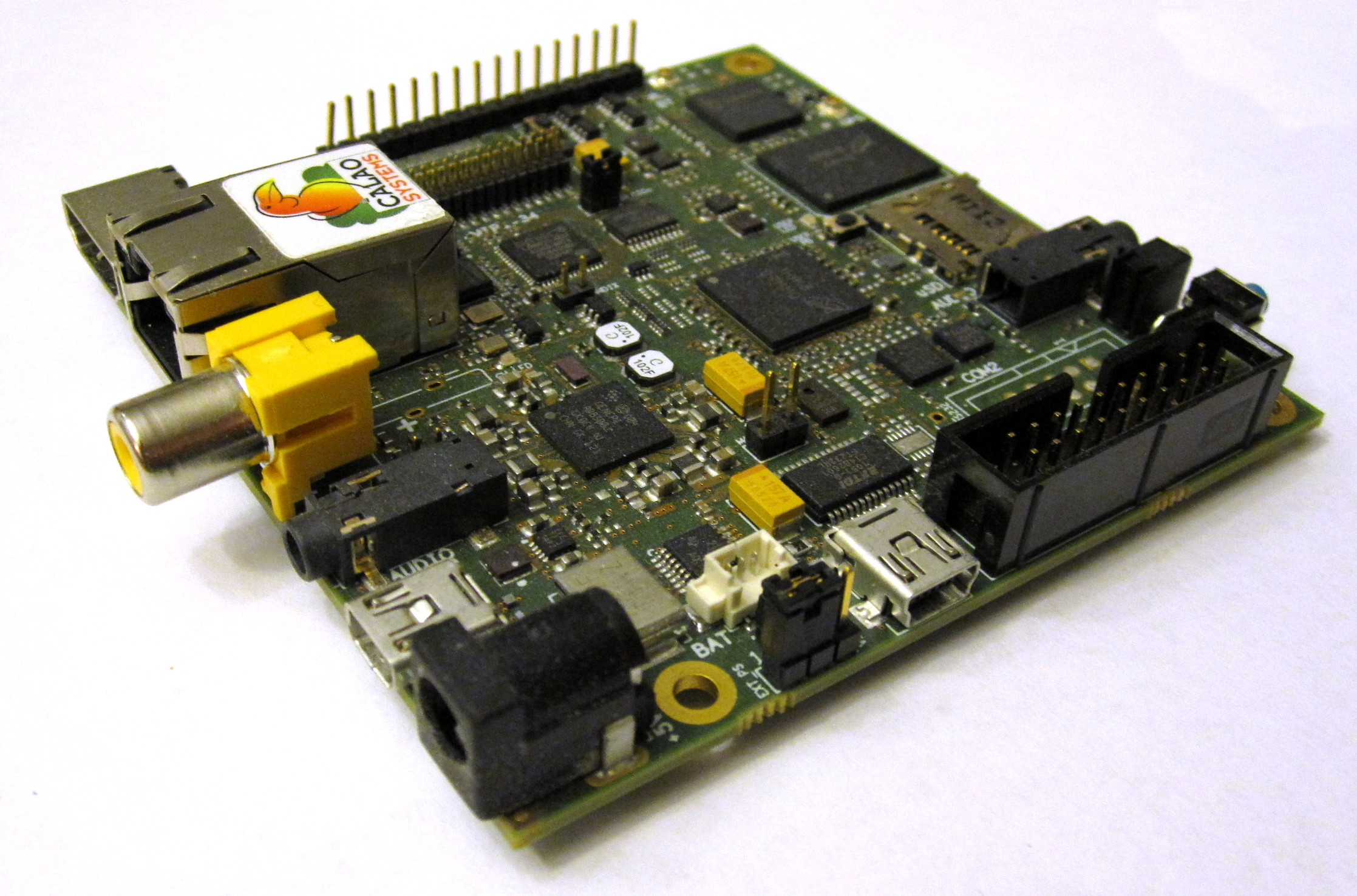
- Snowball-PCB with NovaThor A9500
- Common manufacturers: ST-Ericsson
- Design firm: ST-Ericsson
- Manufacturer: CALAO Systems
- Type: Single-board computer
- Processor: Dual Cortex-A9
- Coprocessor: Mali-400 MP
- Dimensions: Nano-ITX

The Snowball is a Nano-ITX-form factor single-board computer using the NovaThor A9500.

The Linux-based mobile operating system Tizen was ported to Snowball in early 2012.

The Snowball had a public support site at igloocommunity.org, but since support for the board has been withdrawn, the tools are archived at GitHub:

One of the many builds released by Linaro is located here This is build: 13.05 (May 2013). At the link are the binaries that were built, the instructions for using the binaries and instructions for building everything from source.
