= Calao Systems =

French computer company

CALAO Systems
- Type: Private
- Industry: Computer systems
- Founded: 2007
- Defunct: April 2016
- Headquarters: Grenoble, French Alps
- Products: USB key - size computer boards
- Website: www.calao-systems.com

Calao Systems was a French company producing small Linux-based computers, roughly the size of a USB key. The company went bankrupt in April 2016.

Devices use an Atmel or a Nomadik processor (based on ARM architecture) and usually offer about 128MB of RAM (up to 1GB for the most advanced models). The operating system is placed in the 128MB - 1GB non-volatile memory.

Devices are powered via a USB male connector which is plugged into a host computer. During development, communication with the system is also performed using this USB connection (there are no serial ports). JTAG is also provided via USB.

Devices also have a connector to which small expansion boards can be fitted on the top of the main board. There are expansion boards for wireless, motion sensors, Bluetooth and so on.

All Calao USB keys have a wired LAN port. Some also have additional USB sockets.

Calao devices use U-boot and run version 2.6 of the Linux kernel. The company recommends the GNU toolchain to develop the software for these devices.

== Products ==
Calao products
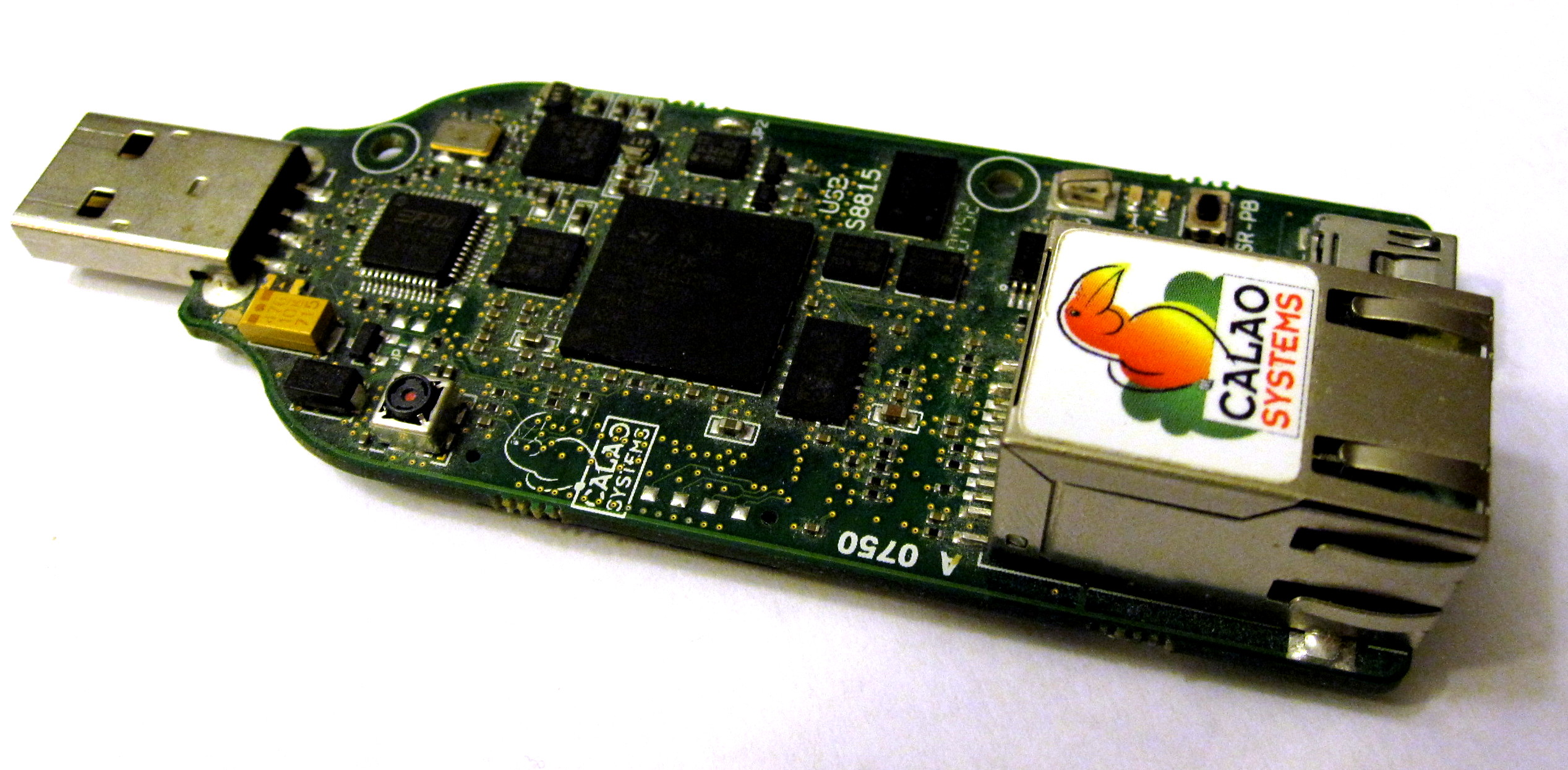
The S8815 USB dongle was a single-board computer manufactured by Calao Systems and sold by ST Microelectronics using the Nomadik STn8815 chipset.

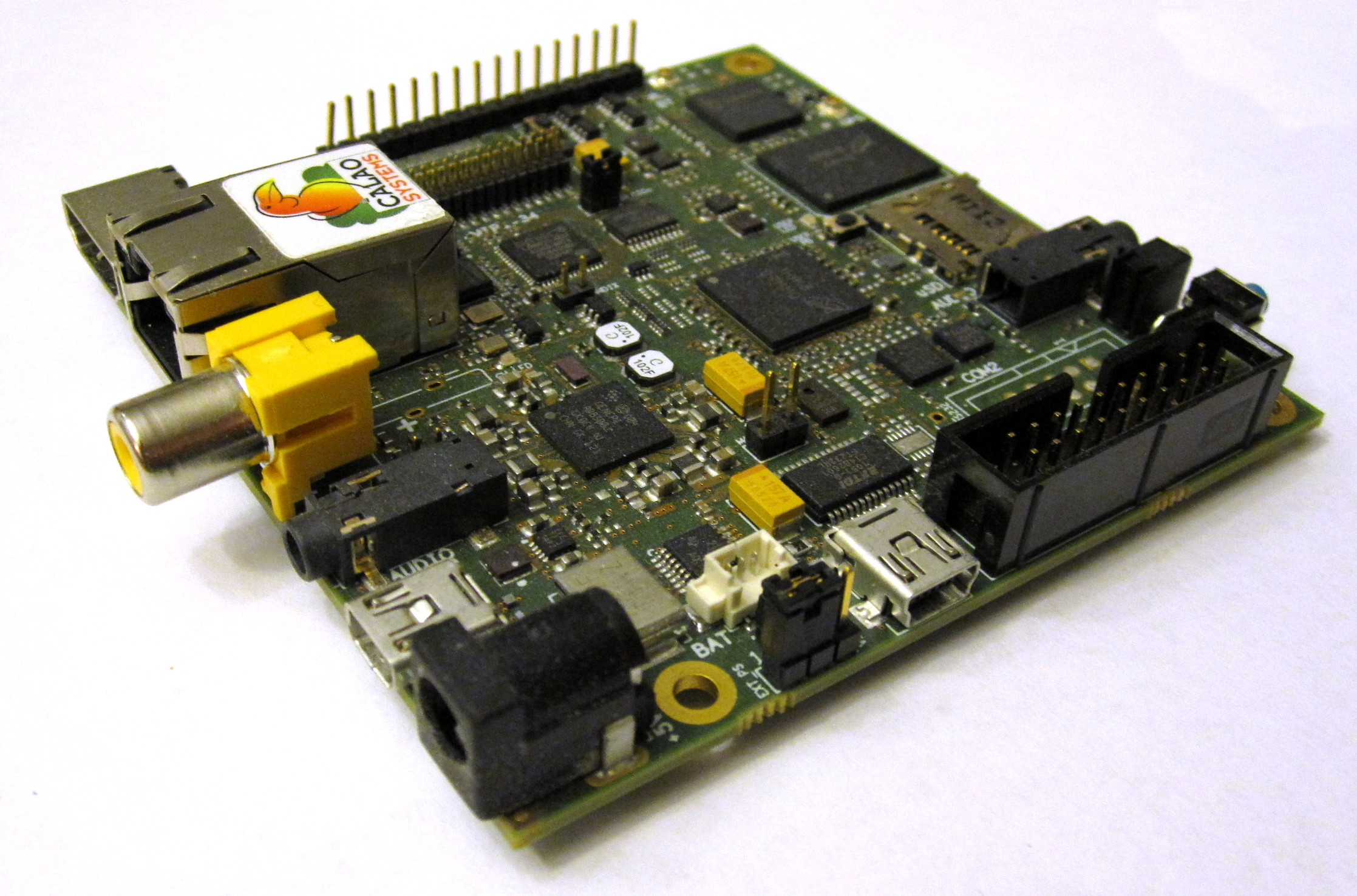
The ST-Ericsson Snowball, a single-board computer designed by Calao Systems.
