= Logic Wireless =

Multinational Corporation in the US

- Type: Private Company
- Industry: Telecommunications
- Founded: 2008
- Founder: Aasim Saied
- Headquarters: Los Angeles, California, United States
- Number of locations: Worldwide
- Key people: Aasim Saied (CEO & Chairman)
- Products: Projector Phone
- Services: Telecommunications
- Number of employees: 19

Logic Wireless is a multinational corporation headquartered in Tucson, Arizona, United States. The company was the first to launch Projector Phone technology.

== Company history ==
Aasim Saied founded Logic Wireless. During his early days at the University of Arizona, Saied pioneered the world's first mobile projector phone called Logic Bolt. In the summer of 2008, Saied formed the Logic Wireless team to provide an innovative technology in the wireless industry, by converging projector technology with a mobile device. The Logic Wireless team took this first prototype to the Consumer Electronic Show in 2009.

== Logic Bolt Projector cell phone series ==
The cornerstone of the company's inventions has been their Logic Bolt Projector cell phones. Logic Bolt 1.0 and Logic Bolt 1.5 were tailored for an international audience.
