= Nomadik =

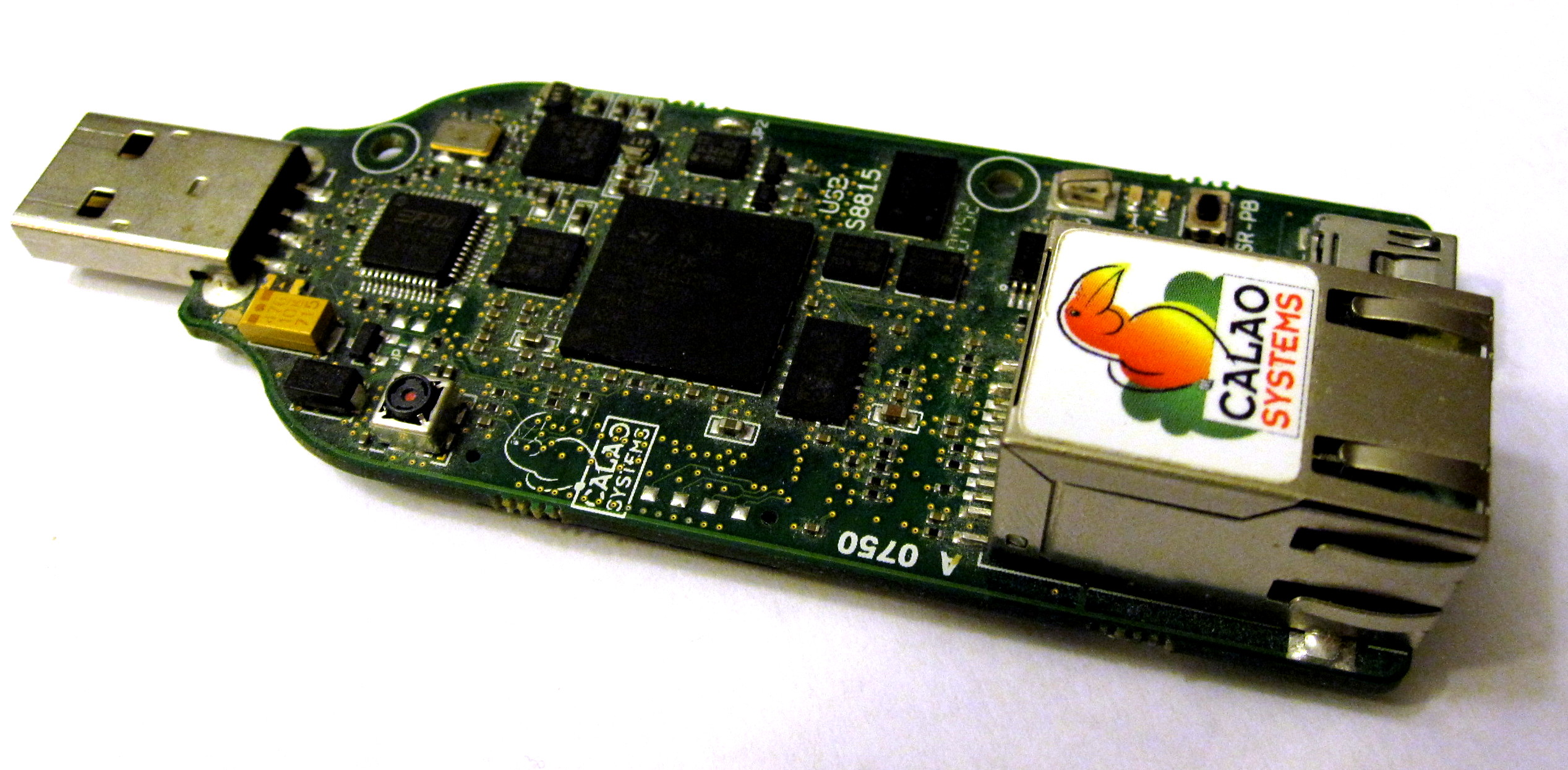
The S8815 USB dongle was a single board computer manufactured by Calao Systems and sold by ST Microelectronics using the Nomadik STn8815 chipset.

Nomadik is a family of microprocessors for multimedia applications from STMicroelectronics, and later ST-NXP Wireless. It was originally based on the ARM9 (and later ARM11) ARM architecture(s), and was designed specifically for use in mobile devices.

On December 12, 2002, STMicroelectronics and Texas Instruments jointly announced an initiative for Open Mobile Application Processor Interfaces (OMAPI) intended to be used with 2.5 and 3G mobile phones, that were going to be produced during 2003. (This was later merged into a larger initiative and renamed the MIPI alliance.) The Nomadik was STMicroelectronics' implementation of the MIPI interconnect standard. Nomadik was first presented on October 7, 2003 in the CEATEC show in Tokyo, and later that year the Nomadik won the Microprocessor Report Analysts' Choice Award for application processors.

The family was aimed at 2.5G/3G mobile phones, personal digital assistants and other portable wireless products with multimedia capability. In addition it was suitable for automotive multimedia applications. The most known device using the Nomadik processor was the Nokia N96 which used the STn8815 version of the chip. When the N96 debuted in 2008, the absence of a GPU was noticed.

== Processor family ==
- STn8800 Based on ARM926EJ-S, announced in December 2003. It had a 200MHz CPU core, was built on 130nm silicon, and included onboard dedicated H.263 video decoding hardware acceleration.
- STn8810 Based on ARM926EJ-S, announced in February 2005, and running at 264MHz. According to PDAdb.net this processor was used in Samsung GT-C6625, GT-C6620, SGH-i200 (all running Windows Mobile 6.1) and LG KS10 (running Symbian). It was manufactured on a 130 nanometer silicon process, supported VGA type graphics and 2-4 megapixel cameras, and could decode VGA H.263.
- STn8811 Based on ARM926EJ-S, the STn8811 was originally announced alongside the STn8810 in February 2005, initially claimed running at a higher 350MHz clock speed, and in stacked packaging options including 32MB of SDRAM and 64MB of Flash memory. However, the product did not appear to be released to market until August 2007, when STMicro finally announced the release of the STn8811, but running at a higher 393MHz.
- STn8812 Also announced alongside the STn8810 in February 2005, with identical specifications to the STn8811 but with a claimed 64 MB of SDRAM, however this processor did not appear to ever see a commercial release.
- STn8815 Based on ARM926EJ-S, announced in February 2006. This processor built upon the STn8810 and STn8811, with the addition of 512Kib SRAM and 128kiB Level 2 cache, while the processor speed was maintained at 334MHz. The processor functionality was also enhanced with the addition of more powerful hardware acceleration for image processing (supporting up-to 5MP cameras), as well as featuring enhanced video encoding (VGA, H.263, 30 fps) and decoding (VGA H.264) multimedia support. This SoC was used in Nokia 6788 and N96, as well as in Samsung SGH-L870. The N96 received some criticism due to the STn8815's absence of 3D graphics hardware acceleration. It was manufactured in 90 nanometer silicon technology.
- STn8820 Based on ARM11, announced in February 2008 with 32KiB data and instruction caches and 256KiB level 2 cache, clocked at 528 MHz, and featuring the addition of a dedicated 3D OpenGL ES 2.0 accelerator, the ATI Imageon Z460. It was manufactured in 65 nanometer silicon technology. However, no devices are known to have ever used this SoC.
- STn8830 was evidently planned for 45 nanometer silicon technology but appears to have been cancelled.

A derivative of the Nomadik was created specifically for navigation systems (GPS), named Cartesio STA2062. This was used in products from Garmin such as the Nüvi 205 and Nüvi 500. This derivative used ARM926EJ-S, was coupled with the STA5620 GPS RF downconverter and added a 32-channel hardware GPS correlator.

The Nomadik family has been discontinued. In 2009, when development had already begun on a successor SoC called STn8500, it was superseded by the NovaThor family from ST-Ericsson and renamed U8500 as the ST-NXP Wireless division was merged into the ST-Ericsson joint venture.
