= NovaThor =

Mobile technology platform

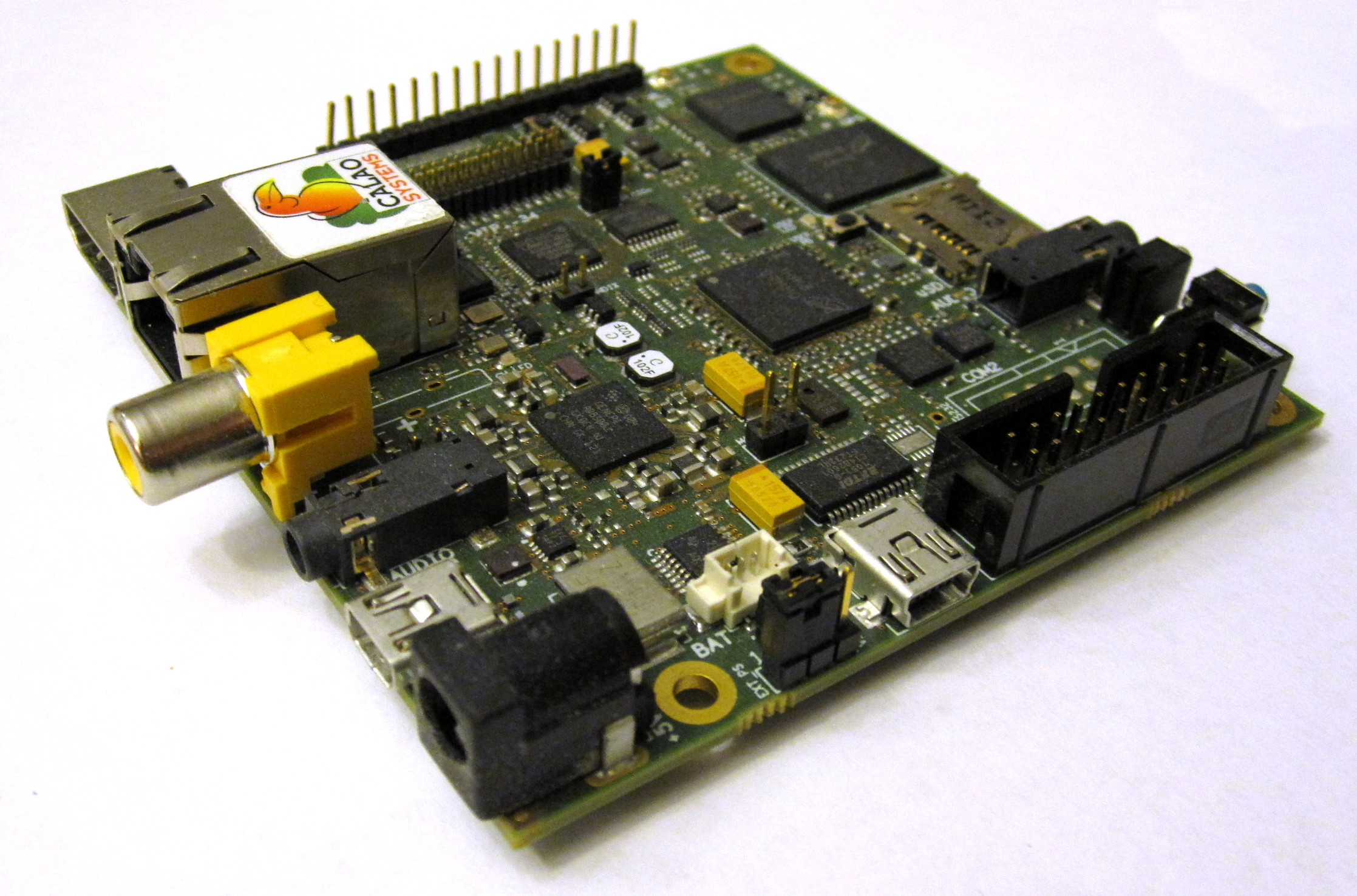
The Snowball is a single-board computer in the Nano-ITX form factor using the A9500 version of the NovaThor SoC.

NovaThor was a platform consisting of integrated System on Chips (SoC) and modems for smartphones and tablets developed by ST-Ericsson, a 50/50 joint venture of Ericsson and STMicroelectronics established on February 3, 2009. ST-Ericsson also sold the SoCs (Nova) and the modems (Thor) separately. The application processor portion of the system was the successor of the previous Nomadik line from STMicroelectronics.

== History ==
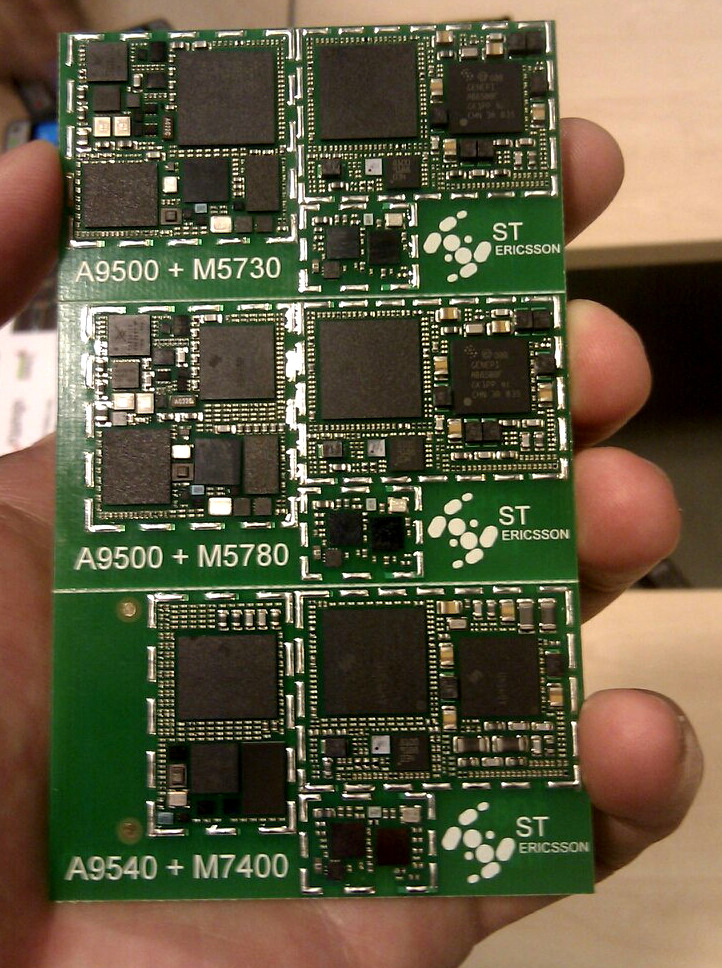
ST-Ericsson late platform chipsets A9500 and A9540 with M5730 M5780 and M7400 modems, some never released or used in real products, showcased at Mobile World Congress, 2011

In early 2009, when development had already begun on a Nomadik SoC called STn8500, it was superseded by the NovaThor family from ST-Ericsson and renamed U8500 as the ST-NXP Wireless division was merged into the ST-Ericsson joint venture.

On November 2, 2011, Nokia announced that NovaThor SoCs will power Nokia's future Windows Phone based smartphones, making a deviation from the standard use of Qualcomm Snapdragon SoCs in Windows Phones.

On February 28, 2012, ST-Ericsson announced that they would switch to fully depleted silicon on insulator (FD-SOI) transistors for upcoming products to reduce power consumption. As an example they stated that the L8540 SoC with FD-SOI transistors would consume 35% less power.

On April 23, 2012, the company announced that development of application processors (such as NovaThor) was to be moved back into STMicroelectronics.

On November 21, 2012, it was announced that ST-Ericsson had joined the Sailfish Alliance hence NovaThor ModAp platform would support Jolla's smartphones and Sailfish OS.

On December 10, 2012, ST-Ericsson announced that STMicroelectronics will leave the joint venture after a transition period making Ericsson the full owner of the company.

On December 20, 2012, Ericsson announced that they will not buy the remaining 50% stake that STMicroelectronics held. The future for the company therefore remained uncertain.

On January 30, 2013, ST-Ericsson announced as part of its quarterly result that they had shipped 10.7 million U8500 NovaThor units in the fourth quarter of 2012.

On May 28, 2013, ST-Ericsson announced that they would sell the assets and intellectual property rights for its mobile connectivity Global Navigation Satellite System (GNSS) to Intel for $90 million.

On August 5, 2013, Ericsson and STMicroelectronics completed the split up of ST-Ericsson and NovaThor is since a STMicroelectronics product.

== List of Nova and NovaThor SoCs ==
Model Number	Semiconductor technology	CPU Instruction Set	CPU	GPU	Memory Technology	Wireless Radio Technologies	Availability	Utilizing Devices
NovaThor U8500	40 nm	ARMv7	1 GHz dual-core ARM Cortex-A9	ARM Mali 400 MP (single core)	LP-DDR2	HSPA	2011	Motorola XT760, HTC Desire 400 dual sim Ontim WP8500, Samsung Galaxy Ace 2, Samsung Galaxy Beam, Samsung Galaxy S Advance, Samsung Galaxy S III Mini, Samsung Galaxy Xcover 2, Shanda Bambook, Sony Xperia go, Sony Xperia P, Sony Xperia Sola, Sony Xperia U, Yulong Coolpad CP7728
NovaThor U9500	45 nm	ARMv7	1 GHz dual-core ARM Cortex-A9	ARM Mali 400 MP	LP-DDR2	GSM/EDGE, WCDMA/HSPA+ (HSDPA 21 Mbit/s, HSUPA 5.76 Mbit/s)	2011	
Nova A9500	45 nm	ARMv7	1.2 GHz dual-core ARM Cortex-A9	ARM Mali 400 MP	LP-DDR2	None	2011	HTC Sensation Z710T (China), Lenovo LePhone S899t, Snowball
Nova A9540	32 nm	ARMv7	1.85 GHz dual-core ARM Cortex-A9	PowerVR SGX 544	Dual-channel LP-DDR2	None	Cancelled	
NovaThor L9540	32 nm	ARMv7	1.85 GHz dual-core ARM Cortex-A9	PowerVR SGX 544	Dual-channel LP-DDR2	LTE FDD/TDD, HSPA+, TD-SCDMA, EDGE (external Thor M7400 modem)	Cancelled	
NovaThor L8540	28 nm	ARMv7	1.85 GHz dual-core ARM Cortex-A9	PowerVR SGX 544 @ 500 MHz	Dual-channel LP-DDR2	LTE FDD/TDD, HSPA+, TD-SCDMA, EDGE (integrated modem)	Cancelled	
NovaThor L8580 (eQuad (Note: With eQuad, the dual-core chip act as two performance cores or, at 0.6 V, two power-saving cores. "e" for electrical.))	28 nm FD-SOI	ARMv7	2.5-3.0 GHz dual-core ARM Cortex-A9	PowerVR SGX 544 @600 MHz	Dual-channel LP-DDR2	LTE FDD/TDD, HSPA+, TD-SCDMA, EDGE (integrated modem)	Cancelled	

== Similar platforms ==
- Atom by Intel
- Apple silicon by Apple
- Exynos by Samsung
- OMAP by Texas Instruments
- Qualcomm Snapdragon
- Tegra by Nvidia
