= ST-Ericsson =

Electronics company

- Type: Joint venture
- Industry: Wireless Semiconductors
- Predecessor: Ericsson Mobile Platforms; ST-NXP Wireless
- Founded: 3 February 2009
- Defunct: 2 August 2013
- Fate: Financial problems (as ST-NXP Semiconductors); Dissolved and remained bankrupted in 2013 (as ST-Ericsson)
- Successor: STMicroelectronics; Ericsson Modems
- Headquarters: Geneva, Switzerland
- Key people: Didier Lamouche (President and CEO)
- Revenue: ▲$1.7 billion US$ (2011)
- Number of employees: 5,000 (as of end 2012)
- Parent: STMicroelectronics (50%); Ericsson (50%)
- Website: ST-Ericsson at the Wayback Machine (archived 13 June 2013)

ST-Ericsson was a multinational manufacturer of Wireless products and semiconductors, supplying to mobile device manufacturers. ST-Ericsson was a 50/50 joint venture of Ericsson and STMicroelectronics established on 3 February 2009 and dissolved 2 August 2013. Headquartered in Geneva, Switzerland, it was a fabless company, outsourcing semiconductor manufacturing to foundry companies.

Both Ericsson and STMicroelectronics appointed four directors to the board with Hans Vestberg, President and CEO of Ericsson, serving as the chairman of the board and Carlo Bozotti, President and CEO of STMicroelectronics, as the vice-chairman.

== History ==
ST-Ericsson was formed on 3 February 2009 when STMicroelectronics and Ericsson completed the merger of Ericsson Mobile Platforms and ST-NXP Wireless into a 50/50 joint venture.

On 20 August 2008, STMicroelectronics and Ericsson announced their interest to merge their wireless semiconductor businesses. ST contributed its multimedia and connectivity products as well as its 2G/EDGE platform and 3G offering. Ericsson contributed its 3G and 3GPP Long Term Evolution (LTE) platform technology. The merger followed an existing strategic co-operation between Ericsson Mobile Platforms and ST-NXP Wireless.

Ericsson also had a venture with Sony called Sony Ericsson during 2001–2012.

On 11 December 2012, ST-Ericsson was on the brink of shutdown after its parent company STMicroelectronics decided to move out of the JV, citing loss of market share due to ST-Ericsson failing to attain Break-even. Since ST-Ericsson came into being in 2009, STMicroelectronics has slipped from 5 to 7 in global semiconductor firms' rakings.

On 18 March 2013, the parent companies announced that the joint venture was to be closed down, with the parent companies taking over parts, but not all, of its operation and products.

On 28 May 2013, ST-Ericsson announced that it would sell the assets and intellectual property rights for its mobile connectivity Global Navigation Satellite System (GNSS) to Intel for $90 million.

On 5 August 2013 Ericsson (NASDAQ:ERIC) and STMicroelectronics (NYSE:STM) announced the closing of the transaction for the split up of ST-Ericsson. This follows the announcement the companies made on 18 March 2013 on the chosen strategic option for the future of the joint venture.

Effective 2 August 2013 Ericsson has taken on the design, development and sales of the LTE multimode thin modem solutions, including 2G, 3G and 4G interoperability. ST has taken on the existing ST-Ericsson products, other than LTE multimode thin modems, and the GNSS (Global Navigation Satellite System) connectivity solution sold to a third party, and related business as well as certain assembly and test facilities.

=== Ericsson Mobile Platforms ===
Ericsson Mobile Platforms had been formed in 2001 from Ericsson Mobile Communications during the European telecom crisis around the year 2000. It was a pure platform company after the transfer of all handset products to SonyEricsson, later Sony Mobile. At the forming of ST-Ericsson, Ericsson Mobile Platforms had roughly 3100 employees. Some of EMPs customers were Flextronics, HTC, LG, NEC, Sagem, Sharp and of course Sony Ericsson. The main focus in the company was for the eight years it existed, to develop a platform for UMTS. Their main development centers were situated in Lund, Sweden and with other three developments centers in Basingstoke (UK), Research Triangle Park, North Carolina (US), and Nuremberg (Germany). In addition, it had R&D, sales and customer support teams in Tokyo (Japan), Shanghai (China), Taipei (Taiwan), Seoul (South Korea), Grimstad (Norway) and Nuremberg (Germany). It provided mobile terminal technology to customers who wanted to develop and produce mobile phones for the GPRS, EDGE and WCDMA mobile standards. EMP and, Ericsson as a whole, donated resources to standardization bodies such as 3GPP, OMA, JCP and OMTP.

== Portfolio and mobile products ==
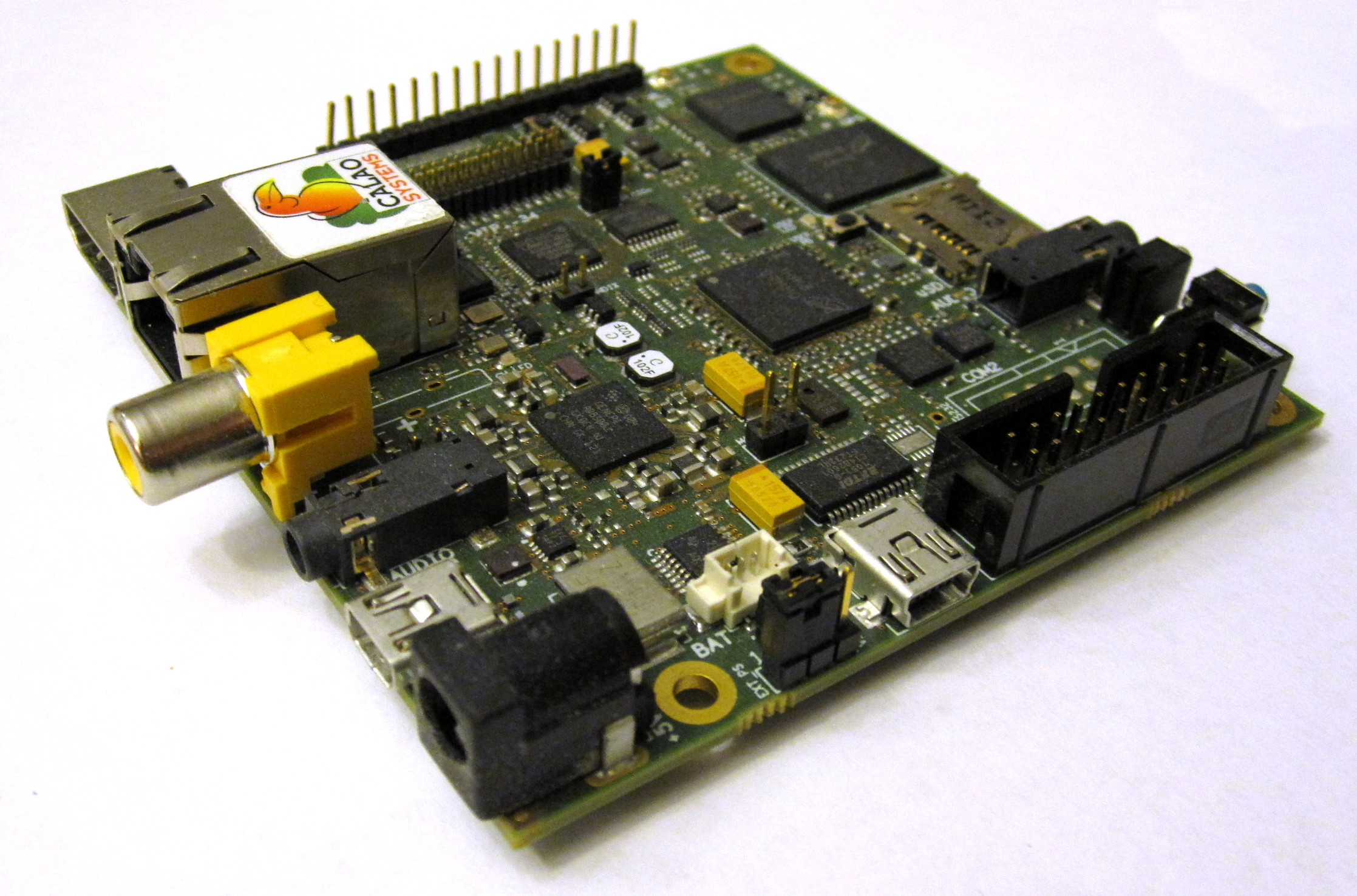
The ST-Ericsson Snowball is a single-board computer in the Nano-ITX form factor using the A9500 version of the NovaThor SoC.

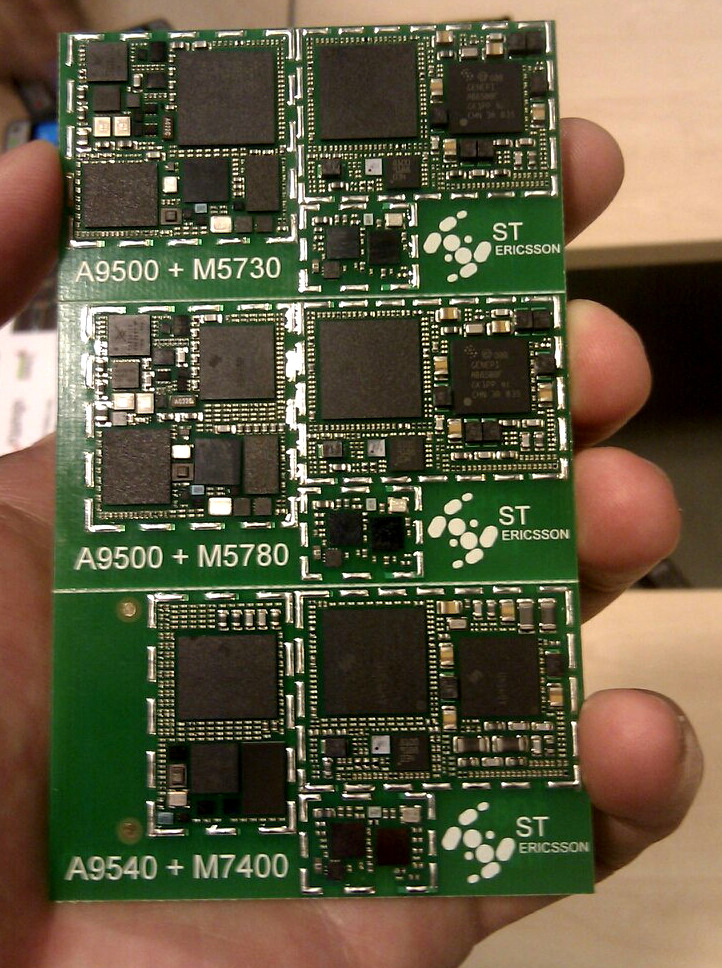
ST-Ericsson late platform chipsets A9500 and A9540 with M5730 M5780 and M7400 modems, some never released or used in real products, showcased at Mobile World Congress, 2011.

Before joining the joint venture, ST Microelectronics' wireless division had been working on the Nomadik application processor platform since the STn8800, which won the Microprocessor Report Analysts' Choice Awards in 2003. Likewise, the NXP part of the company had worked on a product named Nexperia. The Nomadik platform was chosen as a starting point for development of new application processors within the company.

October third, 2008 the predecessor Ericsson Mobile Platforms showcased a handheld prototype for LTE (fourth generation of mobile telephony). At this time, the company stated that the technology would reach the market by roughly 2011. In December 2009 the LTE-platform had a name: M710 and it was presented as a multimode-device that would also be able to handle HSDPA. 1 November 2010 there were statements about a product named M700 and it was said that this would deliver data speeds of 100 Mbit/s downstream and 50 Mbit/s upstream.

Starting 15 February 2011 the company presented a whole family of products:

- A series of application processors under the brand name Nova such as A9600, A9540 and A9500.
- A series of modem products under the brand name Thor such as M5720, M5730, M5780, M7300, M7400 and M7450.
- A series of combined products with both application processor and modem under the brand name NovaThor such as T5008, U4500, U8500, L9540, L8540 and L8580.

Many of these products appear to have failed to reach the market. In the press release regarding the last product L8580 it is mentioned that U8500 has been mass-produced and that L8540 is available in samples since the end of 2012. The quarterly results for the fourth quarter 2012 states that the company has shipped 10.7 million units of U8500 during that quarter.

ST-Ericsson's Chinese subsidiary, T3G was acquired in December 2008 and has been developing platforms for the TD-SCDMA mobile standard since 2003.

== Locations ==
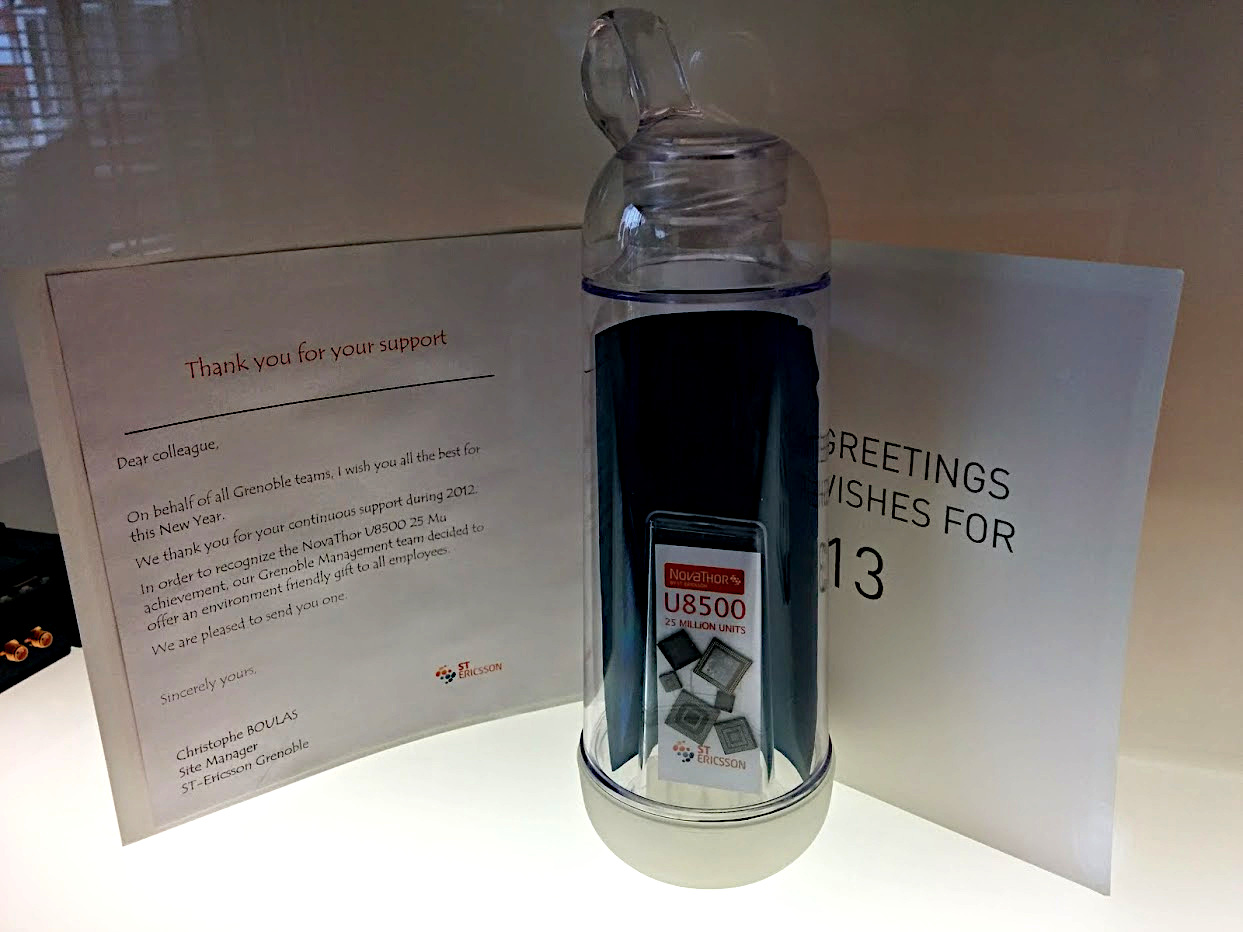
Achievement token celebrating 25 million shipped U8500 platforms found in ST Microelectronics reception in Le Mans, 2014.

Incorporated in Switzerland and headquartered in Geneva, ST-Ericsson employed around 6,700 people worldwide, more than 85 per cent of whom work in R&D.

ST-Ericsson's main centers are in France, Switzerland, Sweden, Finland, Germany, UK, India, Singapore, China, Japan and Korea.

== See also ==
- STMicroelectronics Small Shareholders’ Group (STM.S.S.G.)
- (in French) Collectif Autonome et Démocratique de STMicroelectronics (CAD-ST)
