= Sony Xperia E3 =

Android smartphone

- Brand: Sony
- Manufacturer: Sony Mobile Communications
- Type: Touchscreen smartphone
- Series: Sony Xperia
- First released: 3 September 2014; 11 years ago
- Availability by region: TBA
- Predecessor: Sony Xperia E1
- Successor: Sony Xperia E4
- Related: Sony Xperia M2; Sony Xperia C3
- Compatible networks: 3G
- Form factor: Rounded square slate
- Dimensions: 137.1 mm (5.40 in) H 69.4 mm (2.73 in) W 8.5 mm (0.33 in) D
- Weight: 143.8 g (5.07 oz)
- Operating system: Android 4.4 "KitKat"
- System-on-chip: Qualcomm Snapdragon 400 MSM8926 (D2203/06/43) variants and Qualcomm Snapdragon 400 MSM8226 (D2202/12) variants
- CPU: Quad-core 32-bit
- GPU: Adreno 305
- Memory: 1 GB
- Storage: 4 GB
- Removable storage: Up to 32 GB microSDXC
- Battery: non-user removable Li-ion 2300 mAh
- Rear camera: 5.0 MP Exmor RS for mobile sensor
- Front camera: 0.3 MP
- Display: 4.5 in (110 mm) 480p IPS LCD; HD 854x480 px
- Connectivity: Wi-Fi; NFC; DLNA; GPS/GLONASS/ Bluetooth 4.2; MHL 3.0; USB 2.0 (Micro-B port, USB charging); USB OTG; 3.50 mm (0.138 in) headphone jack
- Data inputs: Multi-touch, capacitive touchscreen, proximity sensor
- Model: D2202, D2203, D2206, D2243 (single SIM); D2212 (dual SIM)
- Codename: Flamingo
- Website: Official website

Sony Xperia E3 is an Android smartphone manufactured by Sony. It was launched to the market on September 3, 2014 in the frame of IFA 2014 like a mobile telephone in the entry to mid-range level, being the successor of the Sony Xperia E1.

== Screen ==
Xperia E3 possesses an IPS tactile capacitive screen of 4.5 inches with multi tactile points. Its resolution is 854x480 pixels, with 16 million colours.

== Hardware ==
Xperia E3 works with Qualcomm Snapdragon 400 MSM8926 of 1,2 GHz quad core SoC (variants D2203, D2206 and D2243), whereas D2202 and D2212 variants run with Qualcomm Snapdragon 400 MSM8226. The phone has an internal memory of 4 GB (1.7 GB accessible for the user) with MicroSD support until 32 GB. It possesses 1 GB of RAM and an Adreno 305 GPU. Its Li-ion battery of 2330 mAh last until two days, and 706 hours being in rest.

== Software ==
Xperia E3 runs Android 4.4 "KitKat" with Timescape UI from Sony. It can execute Android 5.1 Lollipop and Android 6.0 "Marshmallow" in a non-official way.

== Variants ==
The Xperia E3 possesses the following variants around the world:

Model	Bands	References
D2202	UMTS HSPA+ 900 (Band VIII), 850 (Band V), 1900 (Band II), 2100 (Band I) MHz GSM GPRS/EDGE 850, 900, 1800, 1900 MHz	
D2203	UMTS HSPA+ 900 (Band VIII), 850 (Band V), 2100 (Band I) MHz GSM GPRS/EDGE 850, 900, 1800, 1900 MHz. LTE Bands 1, 3, 5, 7, 8, 20	
D2206	UMTS HSPA+ 850 (Band V), 1700 (Band IV), 1900 (Band II), 2100 (Band I) MHz GSM GPRS/EDGE 850, 900, 1800, 1900 MHz. LTE Bands 2, 4 (AWS), 7,17	
D2212 (dual SIM)	SIM 1: UMTS HSPA+ 900 (Band VIII), 850 (Band V), 1900 (Band II), 2100 (Band I) MHz. GSM GPRS/EDGE 850, 900, 1800, 1900 MHz . SIM 2: GSM GPRS/EDGE 850, 900, 1800, 1900 MHz	
D2243	UMTS HSPA+ 850 (Band V), 1700 (Band IV), 1900 (Band II), 2100 (Band I) MHz GSM GPRS/EDGE 850, 900, 1800, 1900 MHz. LTE Bands 4 (AWS), 7,17	

== Other specifications ==
Xperia E3 possesses a 5.0 megapixel (2560x1920 pixels) camera, which can capture photos and videos in high definition (1080p). Also it possesses Bluetooth v2.1 + EDR with To2DP, GPS Assisted and Wi-Fi IEEE 802.11b/g/n and a frontal camera VGA of 0.3 megapixeles (640 x 480) as well as intercommunication between different devices using NFC technology.

== Prizes and distinctions ==
The Sony Xperia E3 was awarded with the Network Dot 2015 prize with the category "Best of the Best" along with Xperia Z3, Xperia Z3 Compact, Xperia Z3 Tablet and Xperia T2 Ultra.

== Apps by Sony ==
Sony has some of the following branded applications:

- Album: typical gallery in where they can see all the images and videos found in any part of the telephone, scanning them automatically.
- Films: allows seeing all the videos in internal memory, the memory of the telephone and the card SD.
- TrackID™: This application serves to scan the audio that are listening and show details about this.
- WALKMAN: Default music player Sony.

== See also ==
- Sony Xperia M2

Preceded by Sony Xperia E1	Sony Xperia E3; 2014	Succeeded by Sony Xperia E4 and Sony Xperia E4g
