= Sony Xperia XA =

Android smartphone produced by Sony

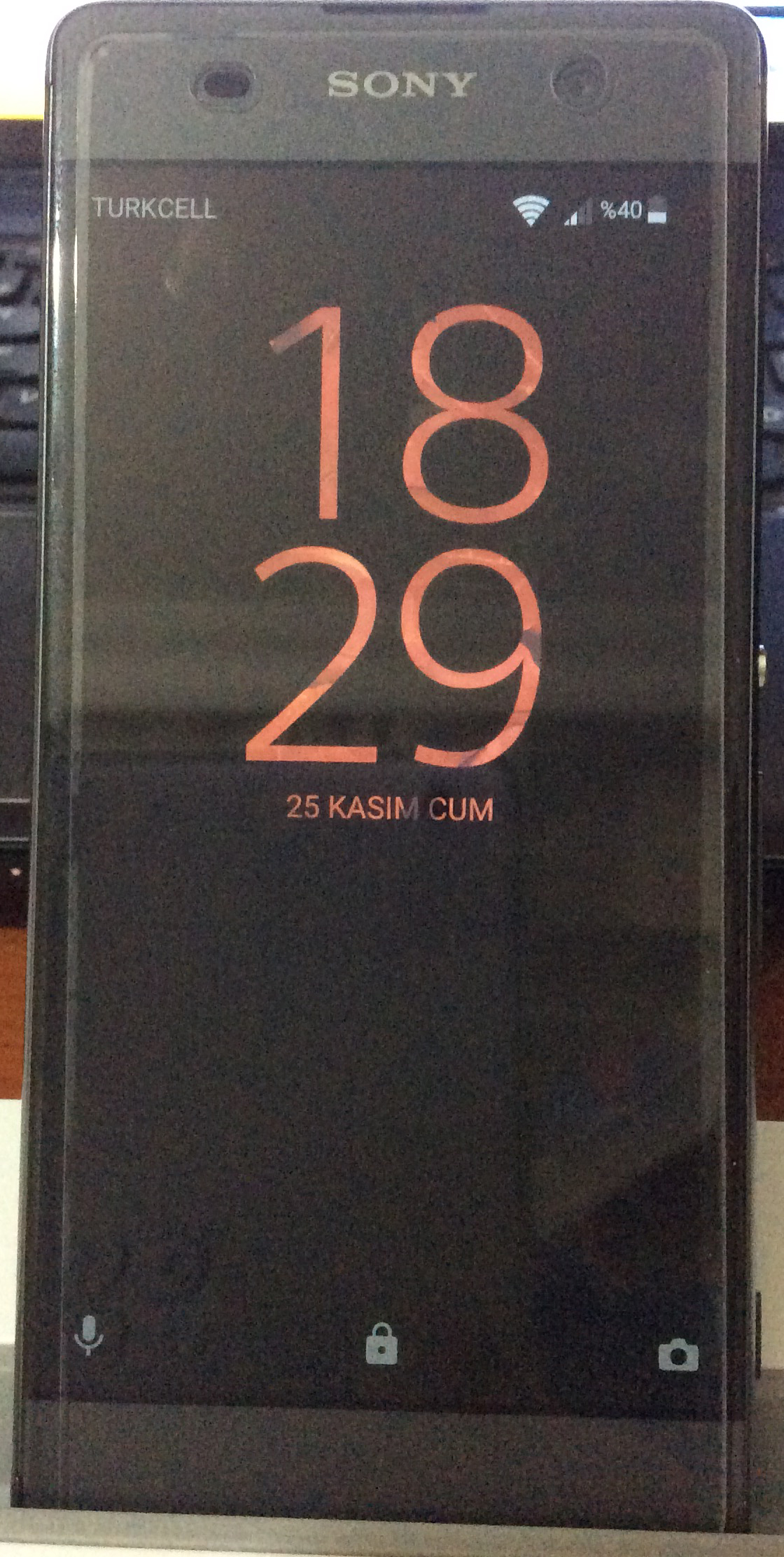
- Brand: Sony
- Manufacturer: Sony Mobile Communications
- Type: Touchscreen smartphone
- Series: Sony Xperia
- First released: June 2016; 10 years ago
- Availability by region: 27 June 2016; 10 years ago (India); 17 July 2016; 10 years ago (USA)
- Predecessor: Sony Xperia M4 Aqua (by price range)
- Successor: Sony Xperia XA1
- Related: Sony Xperia XA Ultra; Sony Xperia X Sony Xperia X Performance; Sony Xperia C4
- Compatible networks: 3G and 4G LTE
- Form factor: Rounded square slate
- Dimensions: 143 mm (5.6 in) H 66.8 mm (2.63 in) W 7.9 mm (0.31 in) D
- Weight: 137.4 g (4.85 oz)
- Operating system: Original: Android 6.0.1 "Marshmallow"; Current: Android 7.0 "Nougat"
- System-on-chip: MediaTek MT6755 (Helio P10)
- CPU: Octa-core 64-bit 4x Cortex A53 1Ghz-4x Cortex A53 2Ghz
- GPU: Mali T860 MP2
- Memory: 2 GB
- Storage: 16 GB
- Removable storage: Up to 200 GB microSDXC
- Battery: non-user removable Li-ion 2300 mAh
- Rear camera: 13 MP Exmor RS for mobile sensor, Quick launch, Hybrid Auto-Focus, 5x Clear Image Zoom, Auto-Scene Recognition
- Front camera: 8 MP for low-light selfies
- Display: 5.0 in (130 mm) 720p IPS LCD; HD 1280x720 px Mobile BRAVIA engine 2, Super Vivid mode
- Connectivity: Wi-Fi; DLNA; GPS/GLONASS/BeiDou; Bluetooth 4.2; USB 2.0 (Micro-B port, USB charging, Quick Charge 2.0); USB OTG; 3.50 mm (0.138 in) headphone jack, 5 pole
- Data inputs: Multi-touch, capacitive touchscreen, proximity sensor
- Model: F3111, F3113, F3115 (single SIM); F3112 and F3116 (dual SIM)
- Codename: Tuba
- Website: Official website

The Sony Xperia XA is an Android smartphone produced by Sony. Part of the Xperia XA Series, the device was unveiled alongside the Sony Xperia X and Sony Xperia X Performance at MWC 2016 on 22 February 2016.

== Specifications ==
=== Hardware ===
The device features a 5.0-inch 720p screen and a 64-bit 2.0 GHz octa-core Mediatek MT6755 (Helio P10) system-on-chip with 2 GB of RAM. The device also has 16 GB internal storage with microSD card expansion up to 200 GB and includes non-removable 2300 mAh battery.

The rear-facing camera of the Xperia XA is 13 megapixels with sensor size of 1/3 inch, featuring Sony Exmor RS IMX258 image sensor with quick launch and also features hybrid autofocus that utilizes phase detection autofocus that can focus the object within 0.03 seconds.

=== Software ===
The Xperia XA is preinstalled with Android 6.0.1 Marshmallow with Sony's custom interface and software. On 23 August 2016, Sony announced that the Xperia XA would receive an upgrade to Android 7.0 Nougat. On 16 June 2017, it was reported that the Android 7.0 Nougat update was rolling out to the Xperia XA.

== Variants ==
Here are the complete descriptions of the Xperia XA variants in the world:

Model	Bands	References
F3111	UMTS HSPA+ 850 (Band V), 900 (Band VIII), 1900 (Band II), 2100 (Band I) MHz GSM GPRS/EDGE 850, 900, 1800, 1900 MHz LTE (Bands 1, 2, 3, 5, 7, 8, 20)	
F3113	UMTS HSPA+ 850 (Band V), 900 (Band VIII),1700 (Band IV), 1900 (Band II), 2100 (Band I) MHz GSM GPRS/EDGE 850, 900, 1800, 1900 MHz LTE (Bands 2, 4, 5, 7,12, 13,17, 28)	
F3115	UMTS HSPA+ 850 (Band V), 900 (Band VIII), 1900 (Band II), 2100 (Band I) MHz GSM GPRS/EDGE 850, 900, 1800, 1900 MHz LTE (Bands 1, 3, 5, 7, 8, 28, 38, 39, 40, 41M)	
F3112(dual SIM)	UMTS HSPA+ 850 (Band V), 900 (Band VIII), 1900 (Band II), 2100 (Band I) MHz GSM GPRS/EDGE 850, 900, 1800, 1900 MHz LTE (Bands 1, 2, 3, 5, 7, 8, 20)	
F3116 (dual SIM)	UMTS HSPA+ 850 (Band V), 900 (Band VIII), 1900 (Band II), 2100 (Band I) MHz GSM GPRS/EDGE 850, 900, 1800, 1900 MHz LTE (Bands 1, 3, 5, 7, 8, 28, 38, 39, 40, 41M)	

== Release dates ==
The Sony Xperia XA was launched in India on June 27, 2016 with The device was launched in the US on July 17, 2016.

== See also ==
- Sony Xperia X
- Sony Xperia X Performance
- Sony Xperia M4 Aqua
- Sony Xperia M5

Preceded by Sony Xperia M4 Aqua	Sony Xperia XA; 2016	Succeeded by Sony Xperia XA1
