= Sony Xperia E1 =

2014 smartphone model

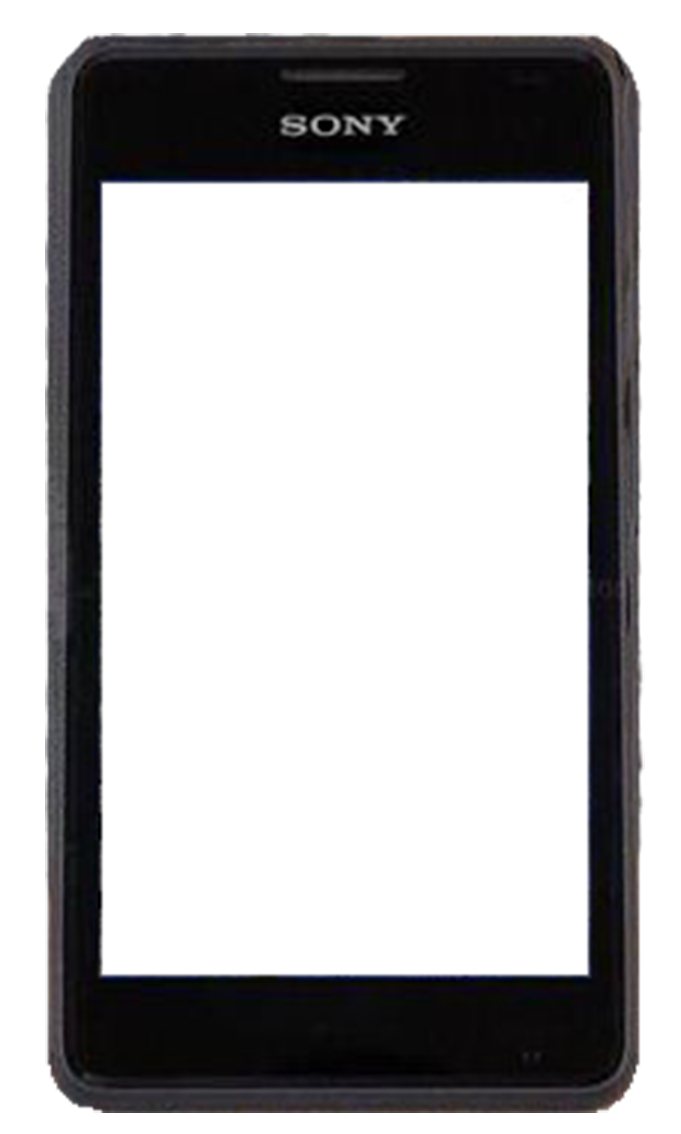
- Brand: Sony
- Manufacturer: Sony Mobile Communications
- Type: Touchscreen smartphone
- Series: Sony Xperia
- First released: 14 January 2014; 12 years ago
- Availability by region: April 2014 (UK)
- Predecessor: Sony Xperia E
- Successor: Sony Xperia E3
- Related: Sony Xperia E
- Compatible networks: 2G Network: GSM 850, 900, 1800, 1900; 3G Network: HSDPA 850, 1900, 2100 (D2004); HSDPA 900, 2100 (D2005)
- Form factor: Slate
- Dimensions: 118 mm (4.6 in) H 62.4 mm (2.46 in) W 12 mm (0.47 in)
- Weight: 120 g (4.23 oz)
- Operating system: Android 4.3 "Jelly Bean", upgradeable to Android 4.4.2 "KitKat"; Unofficial alternative: Android 7.1 "Nougat"
- System-on-chip: Qualcomm MSM8210 Snapdragon 200
- CPU: 1.2 GHz dual-core Cortex-A7
- GPU: Adreno 302
- Memory: 512 MB RAM
- Storage: 2.02 GB
- Removable storage: up to 32 GB microSD/HC card
- Battery: 1,750 mAh
- Rear camera: 3.15 MP Geo-tagging, face and smile detection, HDR, image stabilization, panorama
- Display: 4 in (100 mm) diagonal LCD; 800x480 px (233 ppi)
- Connectivity: Wi-Fi DLNA; GPS/GLONASS Bluetooth 4.0
- Codename: Falcon SS
- Other: Available in black, purple and white

The Sony Xperia E1 is a low range Android smartphone designed and manufactured by Sony, with emphasis put on its loudspeakers. Under the codename Falcon SS and board Shuang, it was announced on January 14, 2014, along with the Sony Xperia T2 Ultra, and was marketed as a music-centric phone. Released during the first quarter of 2014, the Xperia E1 has a dual SIM variant named the Xperia E1 Dual.

== Hardware ==
The Xperia E1 features a 4-inch TFT capacitive touchscreen display with a resolution of 800 by 480 pixels and a pixel density of 233 ppi. It has a 3.15-megapixel camera capable of HDR pictures, 4 times smooth zoom and smile detection. On the inside, the Xperia E1 features a 1.2 GHz dual-core Qualcomm Snapdragon 200 processor, a 1,750 mAh Li-ion battery, 512 MB of RAM, 4 GB of internal storage and microSD support up to 32 GB. Weighing 120 g, the device measures 118 mm by 62.4 mm by 12 mm. The phone includes an FM radio and, for connectivity, Bluetooth 4.0.

Due to the phone itself being music centric, the Xperia E1 includes a dedicated Walkman button found atop the phone that controls the Walkman application and a shaking gesture that handles track navigation. It also includes a speaker capable of producing sounds up to 100 decibels.

== Software ==
The Xperia E1 comes with Sony's stock Android 4.3 (Jelly Bean) with some notable applications additions such as Sony's Media applications (Walkman, Album and Videos). Additionally, the device also includes Sony's battery stamina mode which increases the phone's standby time up to 4 times. Several Google applications (such as Google Chrome, Google Play, Google Voice Search, Google Search, Google Maps for Mobile with Street view and Latitude, Google Talk application) also come preloaded with the device.

== Variants ==
Model	model number
Xperia E1 Single	D2004, D2005
Xperia E1 Dual	D2104, D2105
Xperia E1 TV Dual	D2114

== See also ==
- Sony Xperia E
- Sony Xperia T2 Ultra
