= Sony Xperia X =

Android smartphone produced by Sony

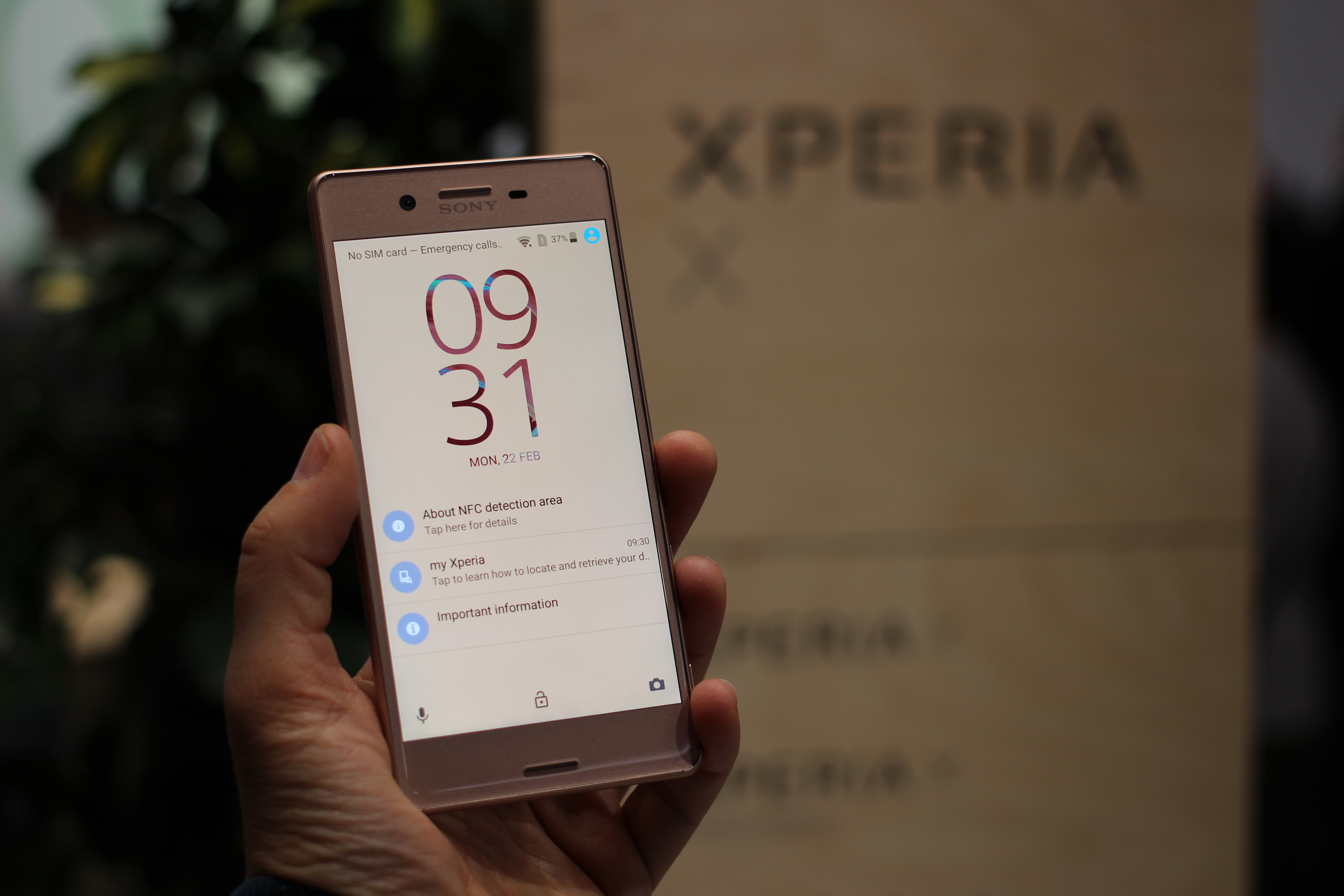
- Brand: Sony
- Manufacturer: Sony Mobile Communications
- Type: Touchscreen smartphone
- Series: Sony Xperia
- Family: Sony Xperia X Series
- First released: 1 June 2016; 10 years ago
- Availability by region: 1 June 2016; 10 years ago (United Kingdom, Germany); 8 June 2016; 10 years ago (Taiwan); 22 June 2016; 10 years ago (Thailand, Malaysia); 25 June 2016; 10 years ago (Singapore); 26 June 2016; 10 years ago (United States); 17 July 2016; 10 years ago (Hong Kong)
- Predecessor: Sony Xperia Z5
- Successor: Sony Xperia XZ; Sony Xperia XA1
- Related: Sony Xperia XA; Sony Xperia X Performance; Sony Xperia X Compact; Sony Xperia E5
- Compatible networks: 3G and 4G LTE
- Form factor: Rounded square slate
- Dimensions: 143 mm (5.6 in) H 69 mm (2.7 in) W 7.9 mm (0.31 in) D
- Weight: 153 g (5.4 oz)
- Operating system: Android 6.0.1 "Marshmallow"; Upgradable to Android 8.0 "Oreo"
- System-on-chip: Qualcomm Snapdragon 650
- CPU: Hexa-core 64-bit
- GPU: Adreno 510
- Memory: 3 GB
- Storage: 32 GB (F5121); 64 GB (F5122)
- Removable storage: Up to 200 GB microSDXC
- Battery: non-user removable Li-Polymer 2620 mAh
- Rear camera: 23 MP 1/2.3" Exmor™ RS for mobile sensor, Predictive Hybrid AF, Quick launch, 5x Clear Image Zoom, 24mm Wide Angle G Lens F2.0
- Front camera: 13 MP 1/3" Exmor™ RS for mobile sensor, with Quick launch and 22mm Wide Angle Lens F2.0
- Display: 5.0 in (130 mm) 1080p IPS LCD; Full HD 1920x1080 px TRILUMINOS Display for mobile with X-Reality for mobile and Dynamic Contrast Enhancement
- Connectivity: Wi-Fi; DLNA; GPS/GLONASS/BeiDou; Bluetooth 4.2; USB 2.0 (Micro-B port, USB charging, Quick Charge 2.0); USB OTG; 3.50 mm (0.138 in) headphone jack, 5 pole fingerprint sensor (except US variant)
- Data inputs: Multi-touch, capacitive touchscreen, proximity sensor
- Model: F5121 (single SIM); F5122 (dual SIM)
- Codename: Suzu
- Other: nano-SIM
- Website: Official website

The Sony Xperia X is an Android-based smartphone produced by Sony. Part of the Sony Xperia X series, the device was unveiled alongside the Sony Xperia XA and Sony Xperia X Performance at MWC 2016 on February 22, 2016. The Sony Xperia X series replaced the former Sony Xperia Z series, as confirmed by Sony Mobile's senior product marketing manager Jun Makino in February 2016.

At the 2017 Investor Day event, Sony announced it would be dropping its "premium standard" phones (one step below the flagship premium models), including the Xperia X and X Compact. The flagship X Performance and XZ phones would continue, as well as the XA1, XA1 Ultra, and the then-upcoming XZ1 and XZ1 Compact.

== Specifications ==
=== Hardware ===
The device features a 5.0-inch (13 cm) 1080p screen and a 64-bit 1.8 GHz hexa-core Qualcomm Snapdragon 650 system-on-chip with 3 GB of RAM. The device also has 32 GB and 64 GB (dual-sim variant) of internal storage with microSD card expansion up to 200 GB and includes a non-removable 2620 mAh battery.

The rear-facing camera of the Xperia X is 23 megapixels with a sensor size of 1/2.3 inch and an aperture of f/2.0, featuring a Sony Exmor RS image sensor with quick launch and predictive hybrid autofocus that utilizes phase detection autofocus that can focus on the object within 0.03 seconds.

The front-facing camera is 13 MP with a 1/3" EXMOR RS for mobile sensor and has a 22 mm equivalent F2.2 lens.

The phone features QNOVO adaptive battery charging technology, which aims to extend the lifespan of the battery.

The rear (back) camera has hardware issues that could result in it not functioning. Users within the product warranty are entitled to a manufacturer repair.

Sony Xperia X, alongside its compact variant, Xperia X Compact, were the last Xperia midrange devices to be equipped with front-firing stereo speakers until the Sony Xperia 10 V 7 years later reintroduced the feature.

=== Software ===
The Xperia X is preinstalled with Android 6.0.1 Marshmallow with Sony's custom interface and software. On August 23, 2016, Sony announced that the Xperia X would receive an upgrade to Android 7.1.1 Nougat. On December 19, 2016, the Android 7.0 Nougat update for the Xperia X has officially rolled out. In June 2017, Sony released Android 7.1.1 Nougat for the Xperia X. Sailfish OS, announced to proceed to the community beta phase during July 2017, has been released and is available in select countries since October 11, 2017. On 6 February 2018, Xperia X received an official Android 8.0 Oreo update. Ubuntu Touch can also be installed on the Xperia X.

== Variants ==
Here is a partial description of the Xperia X variants (X, X dual sim, X Compact) sold in the world:

Model	Bands	Screen	Ref.
F5121 (single SIM)	GSM GPRS/EDGE 850, 900, 1800, 1900 MHz UMTS HSPA+ 800 (Band VI), 800 (Band XIX), 850 (Band V), 900 (Band VIII), 1700 (Band IV), 1900 (Band II), 2100 (Band I) MHz LTE (Bands 1,2,3,4,5,7,8,12,17,19,20,26,28,38,39,40,41)	5" HD, 1080x1920	
F5122 (dual SIM)	GSM GPRS/EDGE 850, 900, 1800, 1900 MHz UMTS HSPA+ 800 (Band VI), 800 (Band XIX), 850 (Band V), 900 (Band VIII), 1700 (Band IV), 1900 (Band II), 2100 (Band I) MHz LTE (Bands 1,2,3,4,5,7,8,12,17,19,20,26,28,38,39,40,41)	5" HD, 1080x1920	
F5321 (Compact, single nano SIM)	GSM GPRS/EDGE 850, 900, 1800, 1900 MHz UMTS HSPA+ 800 (Band VI), 850 (Band V), 900 (Band VIII), 1700 (Band IV), 1900 (Band II), 2100 (Band I) MHz LTE (Bands 1,2,3,4,5,7,8,12,17,19,20,26,28,38,39,40,41)	4.6" HD 720p	

=== Xperia X Performance ===
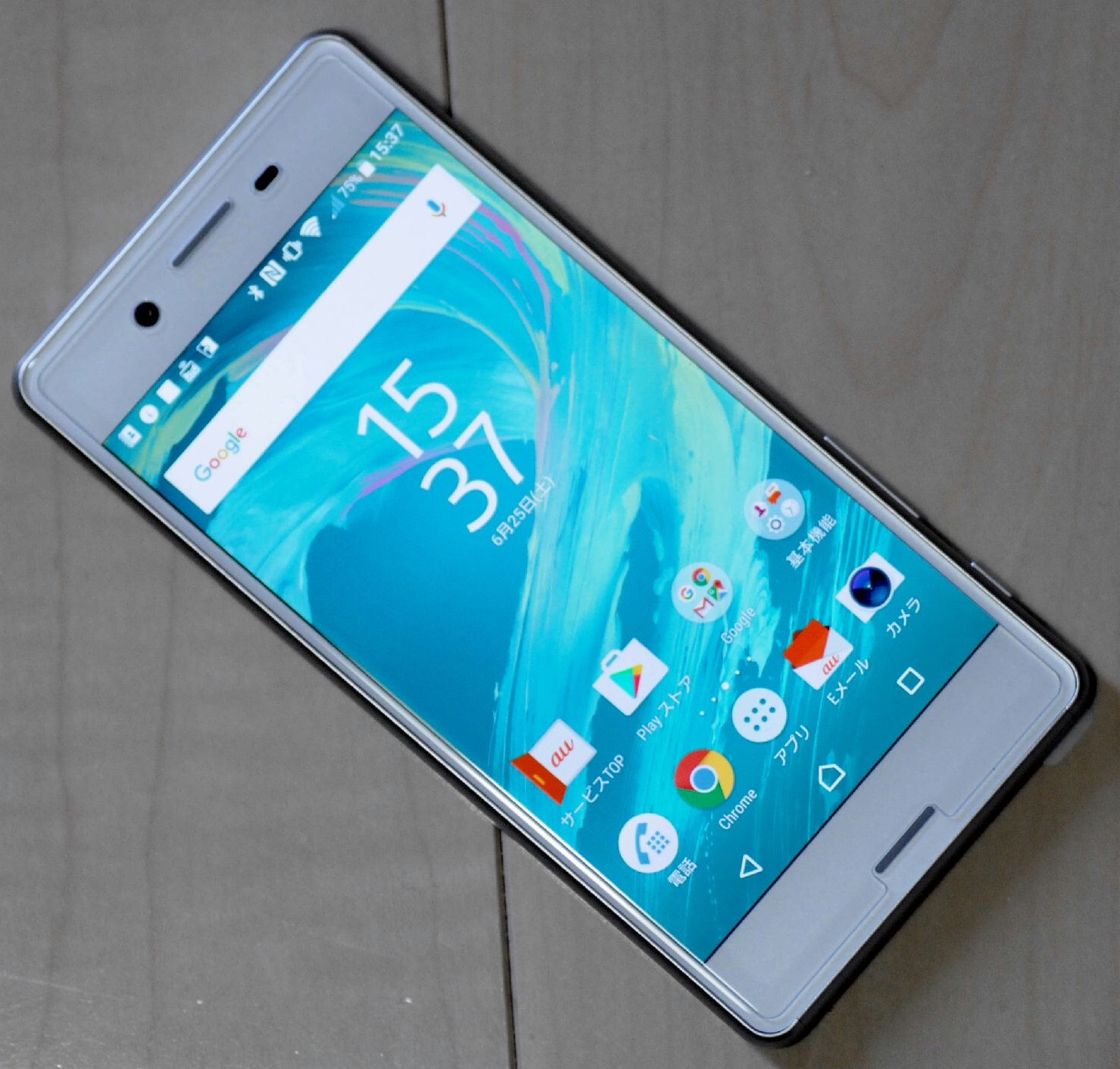
Xperia x performance

The Sony Xperia X Performance is an Android smartphone that is part of the Sony Xperia X series. The device was unveiled along with the Sony Xperia XA and Sony Xperia X at MWC 2016 on February 22, 2016. It was Sony's flagship smartphone for the first half of 2016.

==== Hardware ====
The device features a 5.0 inches (13 cm) 1080p screen, also features a 64-bit 2.0 GHz quad-core Qualcomm Snapdragon 820 MSM8996 64-bit system-on-chip with 3 GB of RAM. The device also has 32 GB and 64 GB internal storage with microSD card expansion up to 200 GB and includes non-removable 2700 mAh battery.

The rear-facing camera of the Xperia X Performance is 23 megapixels with sensor size of 1/2.3 inch and an aperture of f/2.0, featuring Sony Exmor RS image sensor with quick launch and also features hybrid autofocus that utilizes phase detection autofocus that can focus the object within 0.03 seconds. Also the device is water and dust resistant with an IP rating of 65 and 68 and features a fingerprint sensor as well. The U.S. variant will include a free Qnovo Quick Charge 2.0 charger in the box. This would be the first time ever that Sony Mobile has included something extra for its U.S. smartphone customers.

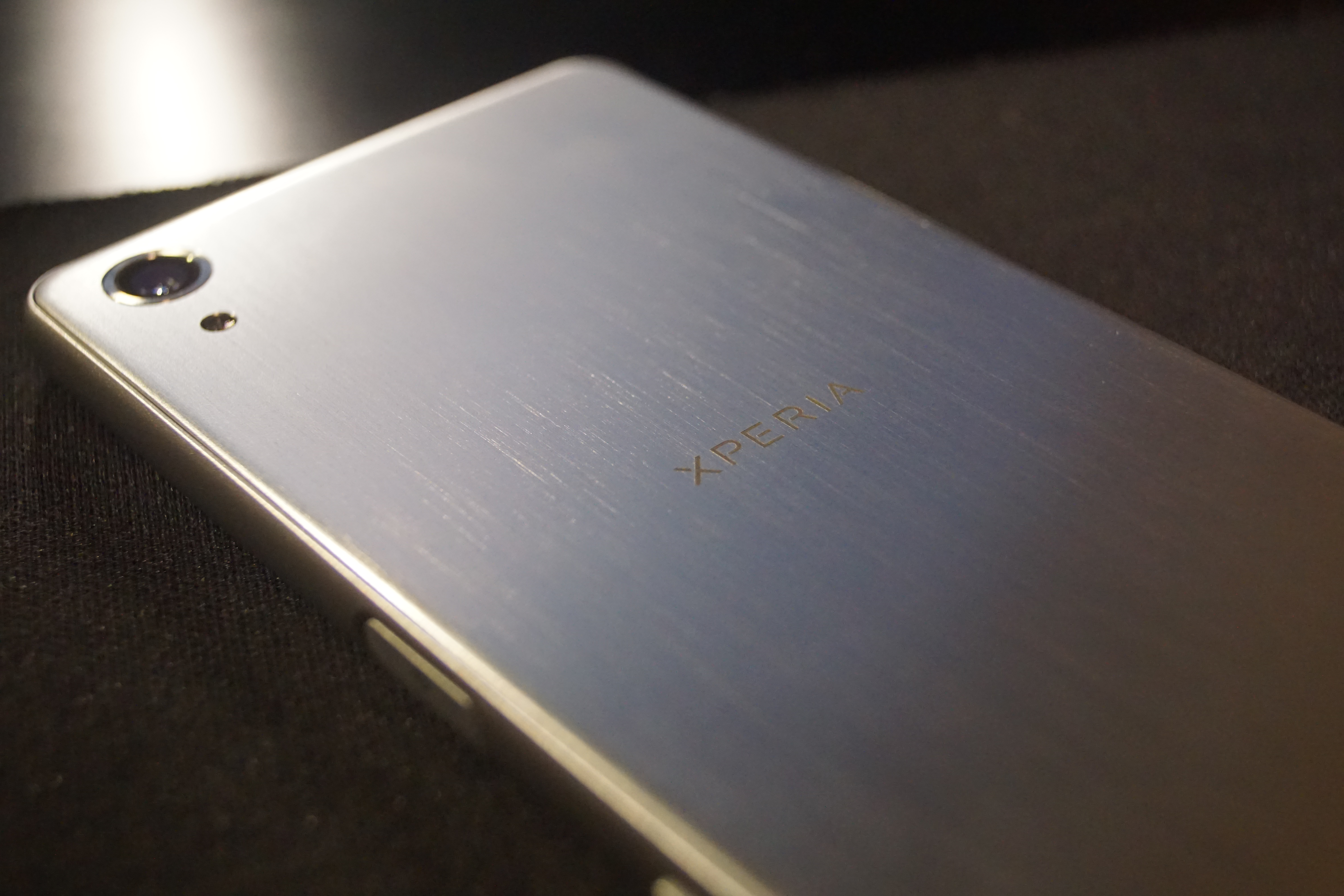
Brushed metal back of the Sony Xperia X Performance

==== Software ====
The Xperia X Performance is preinstalled with Android 6.0.1 Marshmallow with Sony's custom interface and software. On August 23, 2016, Sony announced that the Xperia X Performance would receive an upgrade to Android 7.0 Nougat.

On November 29, 2016, the Android 7.0 Nougat update for the Xperia X Performance was officially rolled out. An update to Android 7.1.1 rolled out in April 2017.

On 27 November 2017 Android 8.0 Oreo has been upgraded for Sony Xperia X Performance through build number 41.3.A.0.401.

==== Model details ====
Here are the complete description of the Xperia X Performance variants in the world:

Model	Bands
F8131	GSM GPRS/EDGE 850, 900, 1800, 1900 MHz UMTS HSPA+ 800 (Band VI), 800 (Band XIX), 850 (Band V), 900 (Band VIII), 1700 (Band IV), 1900 (Band II), 2100 (Band I) MHz LTE (Bands 1, 2, 3, 7, 8, 12, 13, 17, 19, 20, 21, 26, 28, 38, 39, 40, 41 (SO-04H)/ 1, 2, 3, 4, 8, 12, 17, 41 (502SO)

== See also ==
- Sony Xperia XA
- Sony Xperia XZ
- Sony Xperia X Performance
- Sony Xperia C5 Ultra
- Sony Xperia C4

Preceded by Sony Xperia M5	Sony Xperia X 2016	Succeeded by Latest model
