= Sony Xperia XA Ultra =

Android smartphone

- Manufacturer: Sony Mobile Communications
- Type: Smartphone
- Series: Sony Xperia
- First released: July 2016
- Predecessor: Sony Xperia C5 Ultra
- Successor: Sony Xperia XA1
- Related: Sony Xperia XA; Sony Xperia X; Sony Xperia X Performance
- Form factor: Slate
- Dimensions: 164 mm (6.5 in) H; 79 mm (3.1 in) W; 8.4 mm (0.33 in) D
- Weight: 202 g (7.1 oz)
- Operating system: Android 6.0.1 Marshmallow Android 7.0 Nougat (some variants)
- System-on-chip: MediaTek MT6755 (Helio P10)
- Memory: 3 GB
- Storage: 16 GB
- Removable storage: MicroSDXC (up to 200 GB)
- SIM: NanoSIM
- Battery: 2700 mAh Li-ion (non-user-removable)
- Rear camera: 21.5 MP, hybrid autofocus, 5 × clear image zoom
- Front camera: 16 MP, wide-angle 88° lens, LED flash, optical image stabilization
- Display: 6.0 in (150 mm) 1080p IPS LCD HD 1280 × 720 px
- Connectivity: Wi-Fi; DLNA; GPS/GLONASS/BeiDou; Bluetooth 4.1; USB 2.0 (Micro-B port, USB charging); USB OTG; 3.5 mm (0.14 in) headphone jack
- Data inputs: Multi-touch capacitive touchscreen, proximity sensor
- Website: www.sonymobile.com/global-en/products/phones/xperia-xa-ultra/

The Sony Xperia XA Ultra is an Android smartphone manufactured by Sony Mobile Communications, and released in 2016.

== Release ==
The Xperia XA Ultra was announced in May 2016 and was released in July 2016.

== Specifications ==
=== Hardware ===
The device features a 6.0-inch (15 cm) 1080p screen, also features a 64-bit 2.0 GHz octa-core Mediatek MT6755 (Helio P10) system-on-chip with 3 GB of RAM. The device also has 16 or 32 GB internal storage with microSD card expansion up to 256 GB and includes non-removable 2700 mAh battery.

The rear-facing camera of the Xperia XA Ultra is 21.5 megapixels with sensor size of 1/2.4 inch, featuring Sony Exmor RS IMX258 image sensor with quick launch and also features hybrid autofocus that utilizes phase detection autofocus that can focus the object within 0.03 seconds. The front-facing camera is 16 megapixels with sensor size of 1/2.6-inch, featuring Sony Exmor RS IMX234 image sensor and 88-degree depth of field. The front-facing camera also features an LED flash and optical image stabilization (OIS). The rear-facing camera, however, does not feature OIS.

=== Software ===
The Xperia XA Ultra is preinstalled with Android 6.0.1 Marshmallow with Sony's custom interface and software. On August 23, 2016, Sony announced that the Xperia XA Ultra would receive an upgrade to Android 7.0 Nougat. On June 15, 2017, it was reported that Android Nougat was rolling out to the Xperia XA Ultra.

== Variants ==
Here are the complete description of the Xperia XA Ultra variants in the world:

Model	Bands	References
F3211	UMTS HSPA+ 850 (Band V), 900 (Band VIII), 1900 (Band II), 2100 (Band I) MHz GSM GPRS/EDGE 850, 900, 1800, 1900 MHz; LTE (Bands 1, 2, 3, 5, 7, 8, 20)	
F3213	UMTS HSPA+ 850 (Band V), 900 (Band VIII),1700 (Band IV), 1900 (Band II), 2100 (Band I) MHz GSM GPRS/EDGE 850, 900, 1800, 1900 MHz; LTE (Bands 2, 4, 5, 7,12, 13,17, 28)	
F3215	UMTS HSPA+ 850 (Band V), 900 (Band VIII), 1900 (Band II), 2100 (Band I) MHz GSM GPRS/EDGE 850, 900, 1800, 1900 MHz; LTE (Bands 1, 3, 5, 7, 8, 28, 38, 39, 40, 41M)	
F3212 (dual SIM)	UMTS HSPA+ 850 (Band V), 900 (Band VIII), 1900 (Band II), 2100 (Band I) MHz GSM GPRS/EDGE 850, 900, 1800, 1900 MHz; LTE (Bands 1, 2, 3, 5, 7, 8, 20)	
F3216 (dual SIM)	UMTS HSPA+ 850 (Band V), 900 (Band VIII), 1900 (Band II), 2100 (Band I) MHz GSM GPRS/EDGE 850, 900, 1800, 1900 MHz; LTE (Bands 1, 3, 5, 7, 8, 28, 38, 39, 40, 41M)	

== Release dates ==
The Sony Xperia XA Ultra was released in various markets, including USA, India, Hong Kong and Taiwan on 27 July 2016.

== See also ==
- Sony Xperia X
- Sony Xperia X Performance
- Sony Xperia XA
- Sony Xperia C5 Ultra

Preceded by Sony Xperia C5 Ultra	Sony Xperia XA Ultra; 2016	Succeeded by Sony Xperia XA1
