= Sony Xperia E5 =

2016 smartphone model

- Brand: Sony
- Manufacturer: Sony Mobile Communications
- Type: Touchscreen smartphone
- Series: Sony Xperia
- First released: June 2016
- Predecessor: Sony Xperia E4
- Successor: Sony Xperia L1
- Related: Sony Xperia X Sony Xperia XA; Sony Xperia X Performance
- Form factor: Rounded square slate
- Dimensions: 143 mm (5.6 in) H 69 mm (2.7 in) W 8.2 mm (0.32 in) D
- Weight: 147 g (5.2 oz)
- Operating system: Android 6.0.1 Marshmallow
- System-on-chip: MediaTek MT6735
- CPU: Quad-core 64-bit
- GPU: Mali T720 MP2
- Memory: 1.5 GB RAM
- Storage: 16 GB
- Removable storage: Up to 200 GB microSDXC
- Battery: non-user removable Li-ion 2300 mAh
- Rear camera: Single-Camera Setup; OmniVision PureCel OV13850; 13 MP, f/2.0, 26mm (wide), 1/3.06", 1.12μm, AF; Features: LED flash, HDR, panorama; Video: 1080p@30fps
- Front camera: OmniVision PureCel OV5670; 5 MP, f/2.4, 30mm (standard), 1/5.0", 1.12μm; Video: 1080p@30fps
- Display: 5.0 in (130 mm) 720p IPS LCD; HD 1280 x 720 px
- Connectivity: Wi-Fi; DLNA; GPS/GLONASS/BeiDou; Bluetooth 4.1; MHL 3.0; USB 2.0 (Micro-B port, USB charging); 3.5 mm (0.14 in) headphone jack
- Data inputs: Multi-touch, capacitive touchscreen, proximity sensor
- Model: F3311, F3313
- Codename: Bassoon
- Other: nano-SIM
- Website: Official website

The Sony Xperia E5 is an Android smartphone manufactured by Sony Mobile Communications. It was announced in May 2016 and was released in June 2016.

== Specifications ==
=== Hardware ===
The device features a 5.0 inches (13 cm) 720p screen, also features a 64-bit 1.3 GHz quad-core MediaTek MT6735 system-on-chip with 1.5 GB of RAM. The device also has 16 GB internal storage with microSD card expansion up to 200 GB and includes non-removable 2300 mAh battery.

The rear-facing camera of the Xperia E5 is 13 megapixels OV13850 from OmniVision. The front-facing camera is 5 MP.

=== Software ===
The Xperia E5 is preinstalled with Android 6.0.1 Marshmallow with Sony's custom interface and software. Sony Xperia E5 will not get an update to Android 7.0 Nougat.

== Variants ==
Here are the complete description of the Xperia E5 variants in the world:

Model	Bands	References
F3311	GSM GPRS/EDGE 850, 900, 1800, 1900 MHz UMTS HSPA+ 850 (Band V), 900 (Band VIII), 1900 (Band II), 2100 (Band I) MHz LTE Bands 1, 2, 3, 5, 7, 8, 20	
F3313	GSM GPRS/EDGE: 850, 900, 1800, 1900 MHz UMTS HSPA+: 850 (Band V), 900 (Band VIII), 1700 (Band IV), 1900 (Band II), 2100 (Band I) MHz LTE: Bands 2, 4, 5, 7, 12, 17, 28	

== See also ==
- Sony Xperia X
- Sony Xperia XA

Preceded by Sony Xperia E4 and Sony Xperia E4g	Sony Xperia E5; 2016	Succeeded by Sony Xperia L1
