= Sony Ericsson Live with Walkman =

Android smartphone

Sony Ericsson Live with Walkman (WT19)
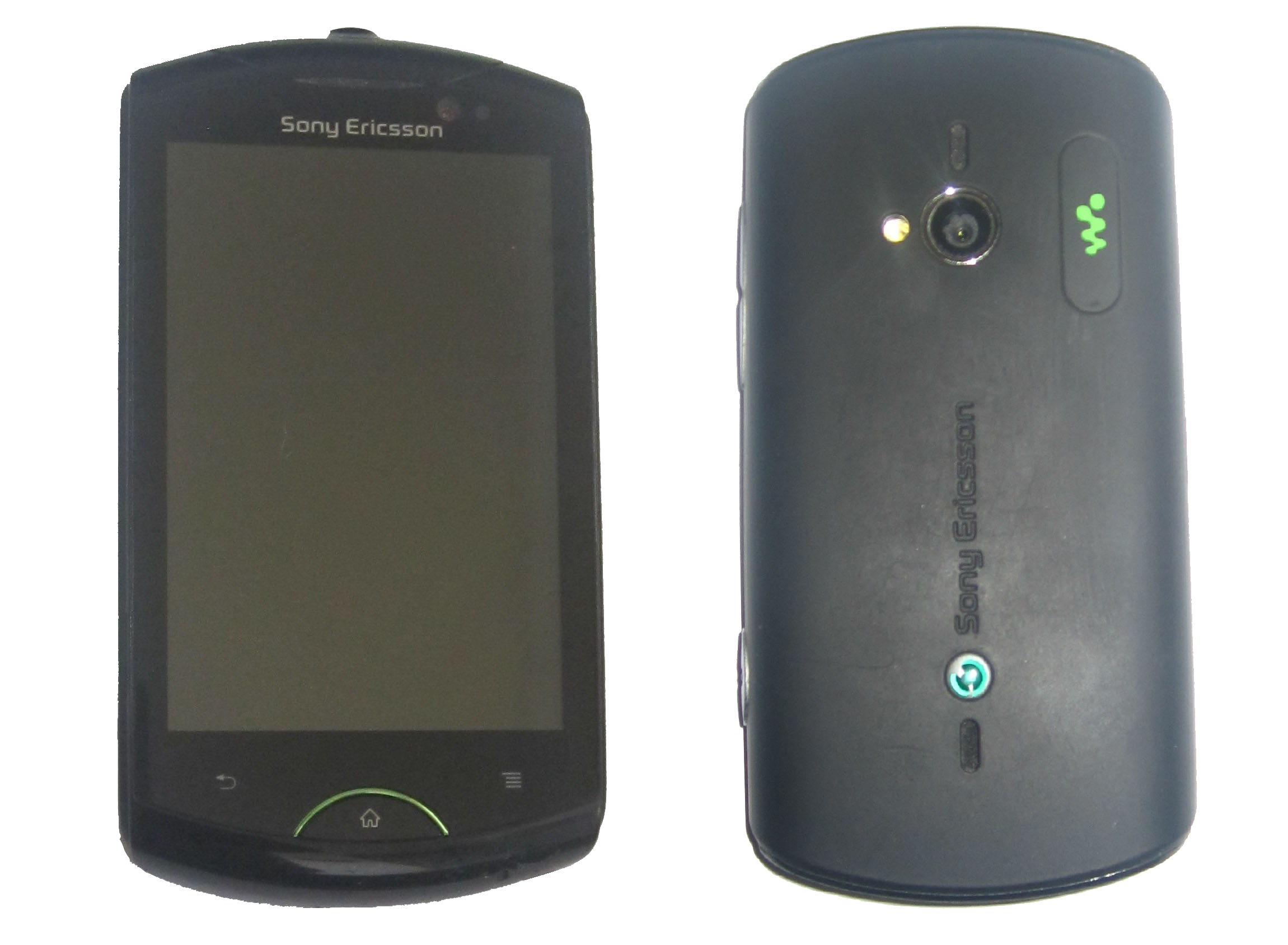
- Manufacturer: Sony Ericsson
- Series: Walkman
- Availability by region: August 2011
- Form factor: Slate smartphone (black, white)
- Dimensions: 105 mm (4.1 in) H 56.5 mm (2.22 in) W 14 mm (0.55 in) D
- Weight: 115 g (4.1 oz)
- Operating system: Android 2.3.4 (Gingerbread) upgradeable up to Android 4.0.4 (Ice Cream Sandwich) unofficially upgradeable to Android 6.0.1 (Marshmallow) via Cyanogenmod 13.
- CPU: Qualcomm MSM8255 1 GHz Scorpion (Snapdragon S2) (stable-overclockable up to 1.6 GHz via custom kernels)
- GPU: Adreno 205
- Memory: 512 MB of RAM
- Storage: 320 MB
- Removable storage: microSD, 2 GB included (expandable up to 32 GB)
- Battery: Li-Po 1200 mAh
- Rear camera: 5 MP 2592×1944 px 8× digital zoom Autofocus; Flash LED illumination 720p video recording Face recognition Geo-tagging; Image stabilization Smile detection Touch focus, Video 720p
- Front camera: VGA
- Display: 3.2 inch 320×480 px TFT LCD at 180 PPI, 16M Colors
- Connectivity: Bluetooth 2.1 with A2DP microUSB 2.0; 3.5 mm audio jack (OMTP standard); Assisted GPS; Wi-Fi 802.11 b/g/n
- Data inputs: Multi-touch capacitive touchscreen, Accelerometer

The Sony Ericsson Live with Walkman is an Android smartphone from Sony Ericsson. It is a music-focused smart phone running Android 2.3 (Gingerbread customized with Sony Ericsson's four-corner UI), powered by a 1 GHz processor. The screen is 3.2" TFT with HVGA resolution and scratch-resistant coating. The phone measures 56.5 x 106 x 14.2 mm and weighs 115g, making it slightly taller and heavier than the Xperia mini but its specs are similar.

There are two models of this device available, WT19i which works with HSDPA 900/2100 3G networks and WT19a which works with HSDPA 850/1900/2100 networks.

== Hardware ==
The display is a 3.2 inch capacitive touchscreen with a resolution of 320 × 480. It supports multi-touch, is scratch resistant and is capable of displaying 16,777,216 colours. The phone has a 3.5 mm audio jack of the OMTP standard which rendered some headphones with mic that used the CTIA standard unusable with this phone. This caused much frustration among users that they had to be stuck with the supplied headphones and since this was a music-oriented phone.

The camera is a 5 megapixels and is capable of recording video at 720p high-definition.

Some units of this phone made a slight hissing noise when connected to an external audio amplifier. This issue appeared to be widespread.

== Software ==
The Live with Walkman operates on Android 2.3 (Gingerbread) with a slightly changed launcher. The device is compatible with Android 4.0 (Ice Cream Sandwich), and Sony released an official update to 4.0 for unlocked units in early June 2012. Availability of the update for branded/carrier locked units is dependent on the carrier to offer it. Many users who updated their phones faced many problems regarding the stability of the device. They experienced slowness along with various bugs which hindered the user experience further. The LED notification of this phone would not work after receiving an SMS or MMS. But, would work in case of an missed call. This being one of the many major bugs faced by the users. These bugs are believed to be present on all 2011 Xperia phones that upgraded to the ICS firmware. Being frustrated, some users downgraded to the Android Gingerbread 2.3.4 firmware through unofficial methods. Sony is yet to release a firmware that fixes these issues.

xLOUD audio enhancement, which boosts the volume of the music and notifications and improves speaker performance.

=== CyanogenMod and other Operating System replacement ===
It is possible for the user to install replacement firmware (including CyanogenMod) after the phone has been unlocked using Sony's Bootloader Unlock Tool (which is only available for out-of-box carrier-unlocked devices). After unlocking the phone with the unlock tool and Fastboot, the user may install the replacement firmware.

The last supported official CyanogenMod was version 10 (based on Android 4.1 Jelly Bean), however, nightly builds exist for newer versions (including CyanogenMod 10.1, 10.2, 11, and 12 which is based on Android 5.0 Lollipop).

== See also ==
- List of Android smartphones
- Sony Ericsson Xperia mini
