= Sony Xperia C =

Android smartphone manufactured by Sony

- Manufacturer: Sony Mobile
- Type: Smartphone
- Series: Sony Xperia
- First released: June 2013 (Announced); July 2013 (Released)
- Predecessor: Sony Xperia L
- Successor: Sony Xperia C3
- Related: Sony Xperia M
- Compatible networks: 2G: GSM 900/1800/1900; 3G: HSDPA 900/2100
- Form factor: Candy bar, Omni-balance
- Colors: Black, White, Purple
- Dimensions: 141.5 mm × 74.2 mm × 8.9 mm (5.57 in × 2.92 in × 0.35 in)
- Weight: 153 g (5.4 oz)
- Operating system: Android 4.2.2 "Jelly Bean"
- System-on-chip: MediaTek MT6589
- CPU: Quad-core 1.2 GHz
- GPU: PowerVR SGX544
- Memory: 1 GB RAM
- Removable storage: 4 GB internal (1.2 GB user available), supports up to 32GB microSD
- Battery: Li-ion 2390 mAh Standard built-in battery
- Rear camera: 8 megapixels with 3264 x 2448 pixels, 4x digital zoom, autofocus, LED flash
- Front camera: VGA
- Display: 5 inch 960x540px "Reality Display" TFT LCD at 220 PPI
- Connectivity: microUSB, 3.5 mm audio jack, Bluetooth 4.0 with A2DP, aGPS, Wi-Fi 802.11 b/g/n
- Data inputs: Multi-touch capacitive touchscreen, Accelerometer

The Sony Xperia C is a touchscreen enabled Android smartphone designed, developed and manufactured by Sony Mobile Communications. Unveiled at the Mobile Asia Expo held in Shanghai, China in June 2013, the phone was targeted at the Chinese market. It was released in July 2013. Despite its limited release in countries and regions, Xperia C managed to sell very well, having shipped one million units in the first 3 months since it availability.

A successor, the Sony Xperia C3, was announced in July 2014. It was released in August 2014.

== Design ==
Similar to the Sony Xperia Z, the Xperia C has a rectangular build with a "Omni-Balance" design, according to Sony, which is focused on creating balance and symmetry in all directions. The Xperia C has subtle rounded edges and instead of a glass chassis, it features a soft-touch back cover that completely envelops the sides and back. Similar to Sony Ericsson Xperia Arc the back of the Xperia C slightly curved which tapers down to being thinner at the center.

== Specifications ==
=== Hardware ===
With dimensions of 141.5 mm × 74.2 mm × 8.9 mm, the Xperia C features a 5-inch TFT display which measures 960 by 540 pixels with a 220 ppi pixel density. The display of the device supports multi-touch up to 5 fingers and has Sony's anti-shatter film applied on the display which prevents the glass pieces of the display to fall out if the display is shattered. The phone also supports an 8-megapixel rear camera with Exmor R sensor which is capable of 4x digital zoom, auto-focus, face detection, Sweep Panorama, and is also capable of shooting videos in full-HD (1080p) mode. The device also has a 0.3-megapixel front facing VGA camera. The Xperia C comes with a quad-core MediaTek MTK6589 processor clocked at 1.2 GHz (making the Sony Xperia C the first Sony smartphone to be powered by a MediaTek SoC), PowerVR SGX544 GPU clocked at 286 MHz with 1 GB of RAM and 4 GB of internal storage with a 1.2 GB user available and can be expand up to 32 GB by microSD. The Sony Xperia C is also a dual SIM smartphone. The first SIM card slot which supports WCDMA network and cellular data while the second SIM card slot supports only 2G networks which is meant for a secondary or overseas SIM card.

=== Software ===
The Sony Xperia C runs on Android 4.2.2 Jelly Bean with Sony's custom launcher with some notable additions to the software include FM radio with RDS and Sony's Media applications – Walkman, Album and Movies. The device does not support NFC which allows 'one touch' to mirror what is on the smartphone to compatible TVs or play music on a NFC wireless speaker. However, the phone does support Miracast screen mirroring. Additionally, the phone includes a battery stamina mode which increases the phone's standby time up to 4 times. Several Google applications (such as Google Chrome, Google Play, Google search (with voice), Google Maps and Hangouts) already come preloaded.

== Availability ==
The Sony Xperia C was released in July 2013 with 3 colours available which are: Black, White and Purple. The Xperia C was launched in China with China Unicom, the only carrier in China to feature the Xperia C for now. However, a Sony representative said a version for other Asia markets may become available in the future. Since then Xperia C has been available to Indonesia, Hong Kong, Taiwan, Philippines, Malaysia, Russia, Thailand, and India. It is available on retail shelves in Saudi Arabia from December 11, 2013.

== Kitkat Update ==
Kitkat update for Xperia C is still not officially available. Rumours are coming since Sony is not speaking out for this update on this device. It's very probable and also logical that Kitkat won't be available for Xperia C because of its 4 GB internal storage (since there is no option for moving apps to SD card in Kitkat). However, it might get Android 4.3 as mentioned by one Indian Sony engineer. He also confirmed that Xperia C won't get Kitkat. It must be considered that it's not officially confirmed.

== See also ==
- Sony Xperia Z

| Preceded by | Sony Xperia C 2013 | Succeeded by Sony Xperia C3 |
