= Sony Xperia E =

Android smartphone

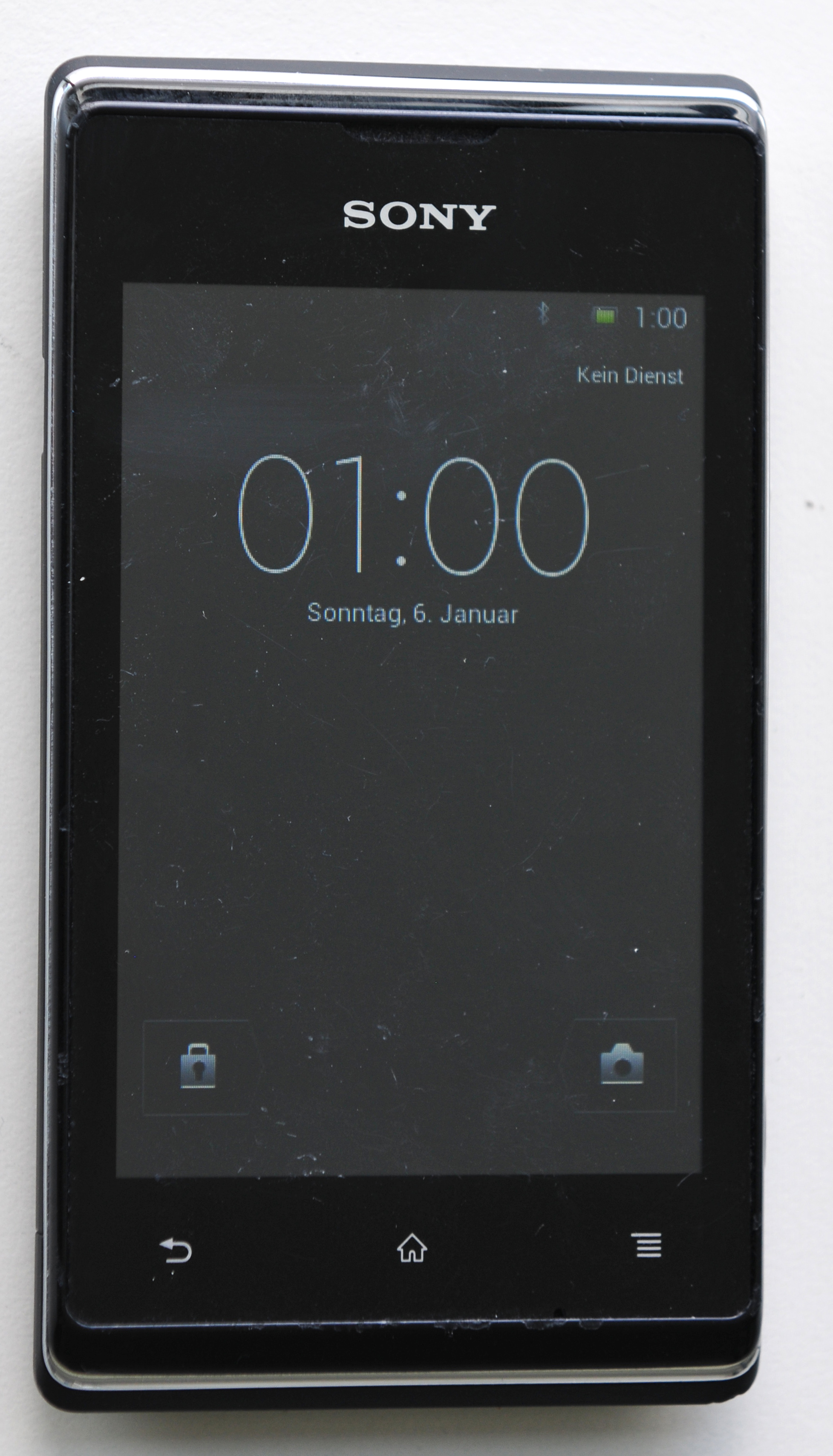
- Manufacturer: Sony
- Type: Smartphone
- Series: Xperia
- First released: March 2013
- Discontinued: October 2014
- Predecessor: Sony Xperia miro Sony Xperia tipo
- Successor: Sony Xperia E1
- Related: Sony Xperia J
- Compatible networks: GSM GPRS/EDGE 850, 900, 1800, 1900; UMTS HSPA 850 (Band V), 1900 (Band II), 2100 (Band I) in the Americas; UMTS HSPA 900 (Band VIII), 2100 (Band I) in regions other than the Americas.
- Form factor: Slate
- Colors: Black, White and Red
- Dimensions: 113.5×61.8×11 mm (4.47×2.43×0.43 in)
- Weight: 115.7 g (4 oz)
- Operating system: Android 4.1.1 "Jelly Bean"; Experimental version of Firefox OS
- System-on-chip: Qualcomm Snapdragon S1 MSM7227A
- CPU: 1.008 GHz single-core
- GPU: Adreno 200, 245 MHz
- Memory: 512 MB RAM (409 MB available to user)
- Storage: 750 MB phone storage, 4 GB internal SD card (2 GB available to user)
- Removable storage: microSD up to 32 GB
- Battery: 1500 mAh Li-ion (5.6 Wh)
- Rear camera: 3.15 MP
- Display: 3.5 in (8.9 cm) 320×480 pixels, TFT, Scratch-resistant glass
- Sound: Built-in speaker, 3.5mm stereo audio jack
- Connectivity: Bluetooth v2.1 + EDR with A2DP aGPS; DLNA; Wi-Fi IEEE 802.11b/g/n
- Data inputs: Multi-touch capacitive touchscreen, up to 2 fingers GPS, Touch-screen keyboard, Microphone, Accelerometer, hardware keys
- Model: Single SIM: C1504/5; Dual SIM: C1604/5
- Codename: Nanhu
- SAR: maximum 1.40 W/kg (ag)
- Other: Wi-Fi hotspot, USB tethering

The Sony Xperia E (C1504/5, 1604/5) is an Android smartphone manufactured by Sony Corporation. The phone was released in March 2013, and is available in single and dual SIM variants.

== Core hardware ==
Xperia E is powered by a 1.008 GHz single core Qualcomm Snapdragon S1 (MSM7227A) processor. The phone has an internal storage of 750 MB, a built-in non-removable 4 GB SD card, (of which 2 GB is accessible by the user) and also supports a Micro SD memory card up to 32 GB. The phone has 512 MB of RAM, of which approximately 409 MB is available to the user. It also has an Adreno 200 GPU, clocked to 245 MHz.

== Display ==
Xperia E has a 3.5 inch TFT capacitive scratch-resistant touch-screen that supports multi-touch up to two fingers. The display has a 320 x 480 pixel resolution, and supports 262,000 colours.

== Software ==
Xperia E runs on Android 4.1.1 Jelly Bean, with the proprietary Timescape User Interface of Sony.

== Other features ==
Xperia E has a 3.15 MP rear camera, that can capture still photos and videos. It does not have a front camera. It also has Bluetooth v2.1 + EDR with A2DP, Assisted GPS and Wi-Fi IEEE 802.11b/g/n. It supports 3G HSDPA mobile data up to 7.2 Mbps, 2G EDGE up to 237 kbit/s, and 2G GPRS up to 68 kbit/s.
At the time of discontinuation, the price was $170 AUD for the single SIM variant.
