= Sony Xperia M4 Aqua =

Android smartphone by Sony

- Brand: Sony
- Manufacturer: Sony Mobile Communications
- Type: Touchscreen smartphone
- Series: Sony Xperia
- Predecessor: Sony Xperia M2
- Successor: Sony Xperia M5 (by generation); Sony Xperia XA (by price range)
- Related: Sony Xperia E4
- Form factor: Slate
- Dimensions: 145.5 mm (5.73 in) H 72.59 mm (2.858 in) W 7.3 mm (0.29 in) D
- Weight: 136 g (4.8 oz)
- Operating system: Android 5.0 Lollipop upgradable to Android 6.0.1 Marshmallow
- System-on-chip: Qualcomm Snapdragon 615
- CPU: Octa-core (1.5 GHz quad-core Cortex-A53 & 1.0 GHz quad-core Cortex-A53)
- GPU: Adreno 405
- Memory: 2 GB RAM
- Storage: 8 GB (E2303, E2312, E2333, E2353); 16 GB (E2306, E2363)
- Removable storage: Up to 200 GB microSDXC
- Battery: non-user removable Li-ion 2400 mAh
- Rear camera: 13 MP with LED flash 1080p video recording @ 30 frames/s
- Front camera: 5 MP; 1080p video recording @ 30 frames/s
- Display: 5.0 in (130 mm) diagonal
- Connectivity: Wi-Fi; DLNA; GPS/GLONASS; NFC; Bluetooth 4.1; USB 2.0 (Micro-B port, USB charging)
- Data inputs: Multi-touch, capacitive touchscreen, proximity sensor
- Model: E2303, E2306, E2353; E2312, E2333, E2363 (Dual)
- Codename: Tulip
- Other: List: Available in black, white, silver and coral IP65 / IP68 (Dust protected, Water jet protected & Waterproof)
- Website: Official website

The Sony Xperia M4 Aqua is a mid-range Android smartphone developed and manufactured by Sony. The phone was unveiled along with Xperia Z4 Tablet in the press conference held by Sony during the 2015 Mobile World Congress in Barcelona, Spain, on March 2. Five months later, a successor Xperia M5 was announced. However, the M4 Aqua's production is still ongoing and is marketed in a lower range than the M5.

The key feature of the phone is having a waterproof and dustproof resistance of an IP rating of IP65 and IP68. It is Sony's first smartphone to feature an octa-core processor and also Sony's first water-resistant smartphone to feature an exposed microUSB port (cap-less microUSB charging).

== Specifications ==
=== Hardware ===
Similar to the Xperia Z3, the design consists of a plastic frame instead of metal with a plastic backing. The device carries an IP rating of IP65 and IP68. Also, the micro-USB port of the device is uncovered unlike other Xperia devices. The device features a 5.0 inches (13 cm) 720p display with a density of 294 ppi. The device features a Snapdragon 615 (MSM8939) octa-core processor clocked at 1.5 GHz along with 2 GB RAM. The Xperia M4 Aqua's rear-facing camera is 13 megapixels with a Sony Exmor RS image sensor and the front facing camera is 5 megapixels. The device is also equipped with ANT+™ sport, fitness, health support built-in.

=== Software ===
The Xperia M4 Aqua is Sony’s first device to come preinstalled with Android 5.0 Lollipop. The device was updated to Android 6.0 Marshmallow in July 2016.

== Reception ==
Tom's Hardware listed the Xperia M4 Aqua as the best value phone in their best of Mobile World Congress 2015 list. CNET has reviewed the phone and given a score of 3 out of 5, praising the build quality of the phone while criticizing the quality of the camera. Phonearena has given a score of 7 out of 10, praising the design of the phone and its price point but criticized the camera and low internal storage size of the device.

| Preceded by Sony Xperia M2; Sony Xperia T3 | Sony mid-range Smartphone; 2015 | Succeeded by Sony Xperia XA |
| Preceded by Sony Xperia M2 | Sony Xperia M Series Smartphone; 2015 | Succeeded by Sony Xperia M5 |
