= Sony Xperia Tipo =

Android smartphone

Sony Xperia Tipo Sony Xperia Tipo Dual
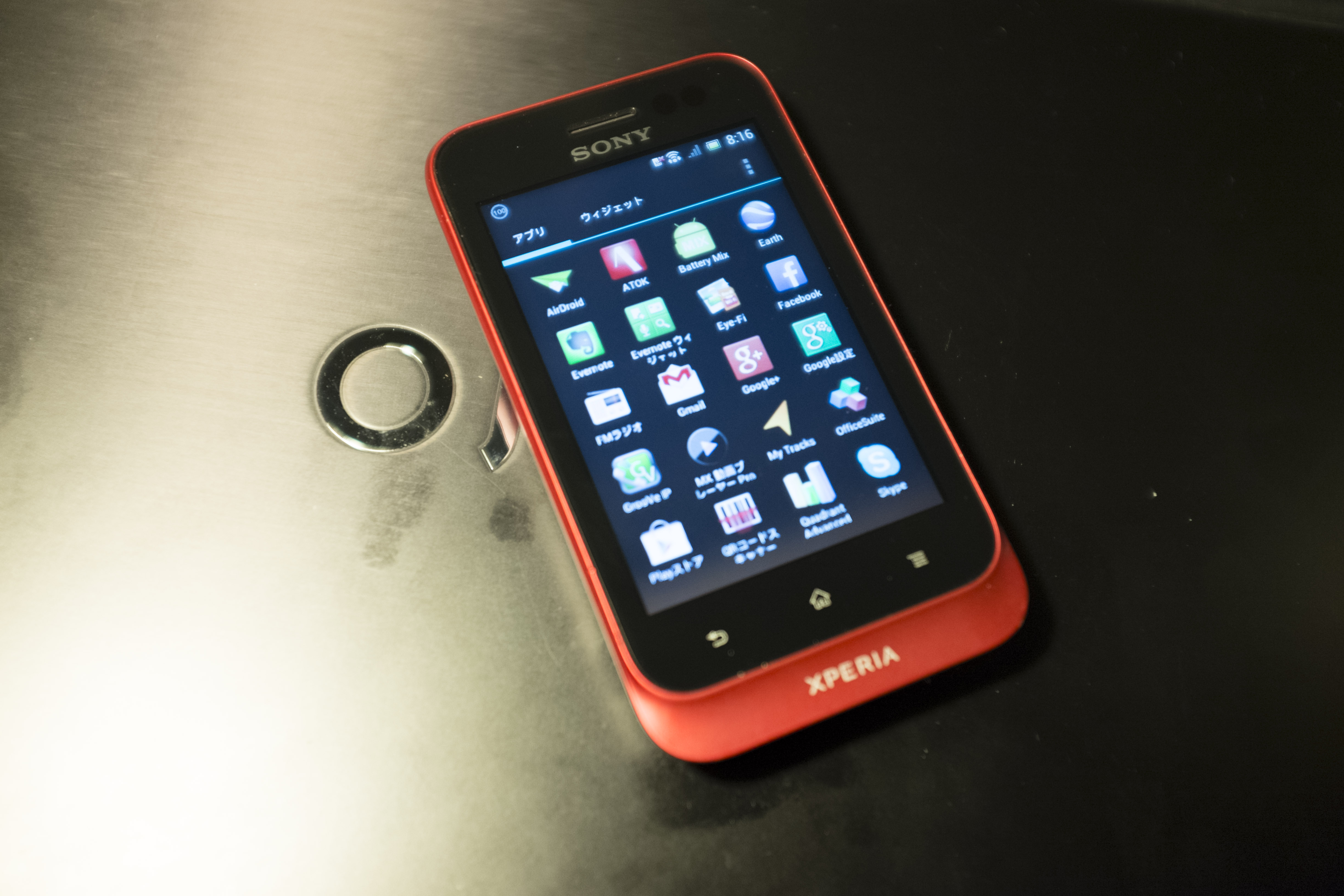
- The Sony Xperia tipo
- Manufacturer: Sony Mobile
- Type: Smartphone
- Series: Sony Xperia
- First released: August 2012
- Predecessor: Sony Ericsson Xperia mini
- Successor: Sony Xperia E
- Related: Sony Xperia miro
- Compatible networks: GSM GPRS/EDGE 850, 900, 1800, 1900; UMTS HSPA 900, 2100 (Global except Americas); UMTS HSPA 850, 1900, 2100 (Americas) (Americas)
- Form factor: Candy bar
- Colors: Classic Black, Classic White, Deep Red, Navy Blue(Xperia tipo); Black, Silver(Xperia tipo dual)
- Dimensions: 103×57×13 mm (4.06×2.24×0.51 in)
- Weight: 99.4 g (4 oz)
- Operating system: Android 4.0 "Ice Cream Sandwich"
- System-on-chip: Qualcomm Snapdragon S1 MSM7225A
- CPU: Single-core ARM Cortex-A5 at 800 MHz
- GPU: Adreno 200
- Memory: 512 MB RAM
- Removable storage: 2.9 GB internal (2.5 GB user available), supports up to 32GB microSD/HC card
- Battery: Li-ion 1500 mAh(internal) Standard battery
- Rear camera: 3.2 megapixels with 4x digital zoom, supports VGA video recording
- Front camera: None
- Display: 3.2 inch 320x480 px "Reality Display" TFT LCD at 180 PPI
- Connectivity: microUSB, 3.5 mm audio jack, Bluetooth 2.1 with A2DP, aGPS, Wi-Fi 802.11 b/g/n
- Data inputs: Multi-touch capacitive touchscreen, Accelerometer
- Codename: Tapioca
- Other: Sony Entertainment Networks – Music and Video Unlimited*

The Sony Xperia Tipo is a mid-range Android smartphone manufactured by Sony Mobile Communications. The device was released globally during August 2012. There is a dual-SIM version of the Xperia tipo available in certain countries known as the Xperia Tipo Dual.

== Availability ==
The phone was officially announced with the Sony Xperia miro by Sony Mobile Communications on 13 June 2012 and was officially released worldwide during August 2012. The Xperia tipo was available in Classic Black, Classic White, Deep Red and Navy Blue while the Xperia tipo dual was only available in Classic Black and Silver.

== Hardware ==
The device measures 103 by 57 by 13 mm and weighs 99.4 grams. It features a capacitive touchscreen display which measures 3.2 inches with a resolution of 320 × 480 pixels at 180 ppi with multitouch support and is capable of displaying 262,000 colours. The glass of the display is made from plastic. The camera of the device has 3.2 megapixels capable of 4x digital zoom and supports VGA video recording, it does not have a front-facing camera. It has a Qualcomm Snapdragon S1 MSM7225A single-core 800 MHz ARM Cortex-A5 processor with 2.9 GB of internal memory with up to 2.5 GB user-accessible memory and also has an external slot which supports a maximum 32 GB external memory on microSD card.

=== Tipo Dual ===
Other than having another sim card slot, the Xperia tipo and Xperia tipo dual are the same. However, the Xperia tipo dual is only available in black and silver, rather than black, silver, red and blue. Only one SIM is used at a time; a hardware button on the right hand side of the device is used to switch between them.

== Software ==
The device runs on Android 4.0.4 "Ice Cream Sandwich operating system and is integrated with Sony's social media service called Timescape. The software also includes Sony's xLOUD audio filter technology for better music experience and it features stereo FM radio with RDS. Similar to the Xperia miro, the phone is capable of 3D and Motion gaming and is also connected to the Sony Entertainment Network, allowing users to access Music & Video Unlimited.
