= Sony Xperia E4 =

Android based smartphone

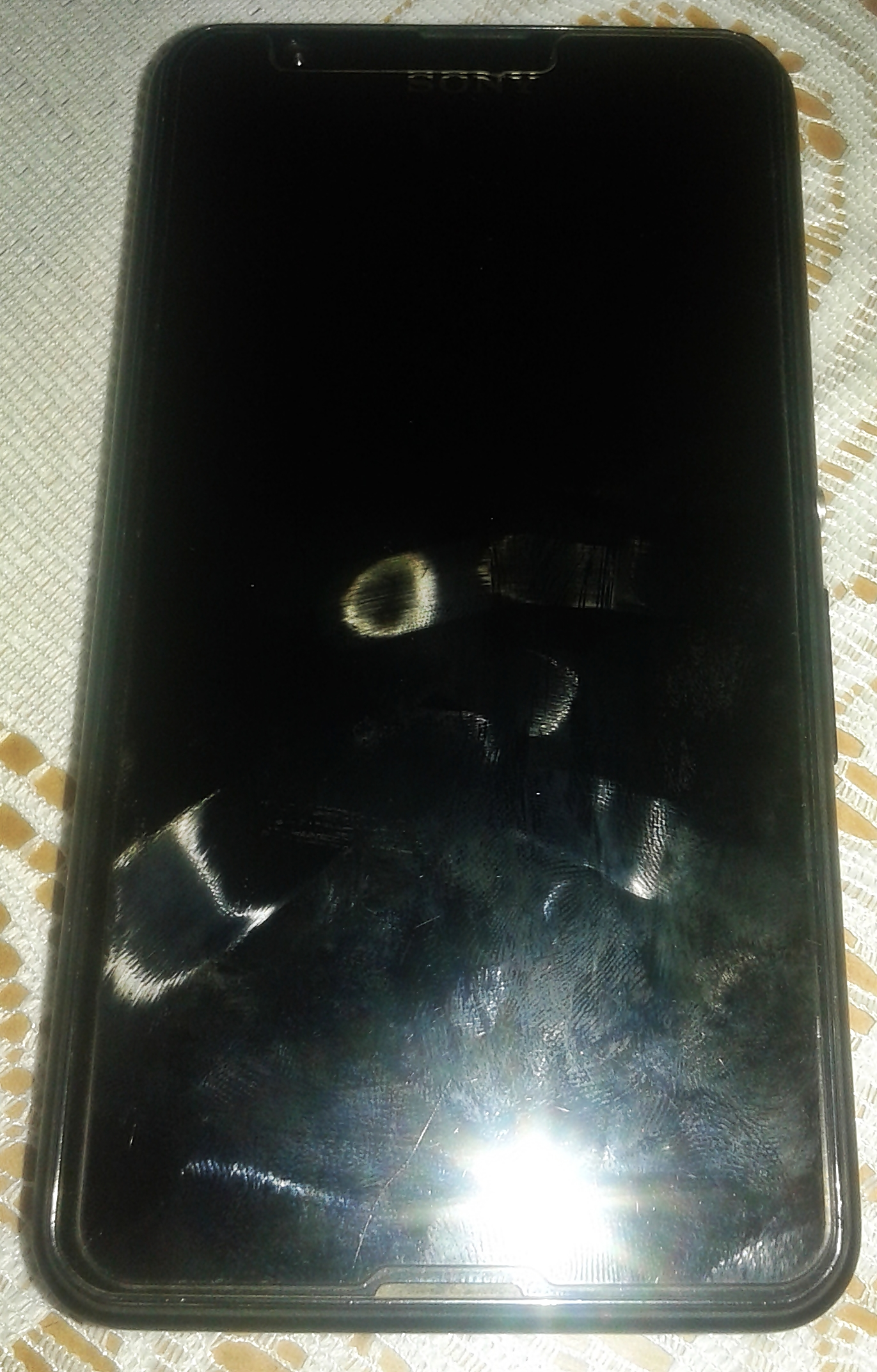
- Brand: Sony Xperia
- Manufacturer: Sony Mobile Communications
- Type: Smartphone
- First released: 23 April 2015
- Units sold: 3 Million
- Predecessor: Sony Xperia E3
- Successor: Sony Xperia E5
- Related: Sony Xperia M4 Aqua
- Compatible networks: GSM/GPRS/EDGE 850/900/1800/1900; CDMA 1.9 GHz CDMA PCS/800 MHz; WCDMA
- Form factor: Slate
- Operating system: Android 4.4.4 "KitKat"
- System-on-chip: Mediatek
- CPU: 1.5 GHz quad-core
- GPU: GPU Mali-T760MP2
- Memory: 1 GB RAM
- Storage: 8 GB
- Removable storage: microSDXC up to 32 GB
- Battery: 2300 mAh
- Rear camera: Single-Camera Setup; OmniVision OV5648; 5 MP, f/2.6, 30mm (standard), 1/4.0", 1.4μm, AF; Features: LED flash, HDR, panorama, Auto Scene Recognition; Video: 1080p@30fps
- Front camera: OmniVision OV2680; 2 MP, f/2.8, 31mm (standard), 1/5.0", 1.75μm; Features: HDR; Video: 720p@30fps
- Display: 5.0 in (130 mm); IPS LCD
- Codename: Jasmine
- Website: Official website

Sony Xperia E4 is an Android based smartphone manufactured by Sony Mobile Communications. It is a budget oriented mid-range device with 5" qHD IPS display, a 5-megapixel camera and a 2 MP front camera with automatic scene recognition. Like other Sony phones, the E4 has its own OmniBalance dual-layered design. The outermost layer has its own body and the glass screen part has its own division which is enclosed by the outermost layer. The Sony Xperia E4 is a mid-range Android smartphone designed and manufactured by Sony. It was announced in February 2015. The Xperia E4 has a dual-SIM variant named the Xperia E4 Dual and the Xperia E4 has a kind of LTE successor which is the Sony Xperia E4g.

== Hardware ==
The Xperia E4 features a 5-inch display with a resolution of qHD IPS. It has a 5 megapixels camera capable of HDR pictures. On the inside, the Xperia E4 features a 1.3 GHz quad-core MediaTek processor, a 2,300 mAh Li-ion battery, 1 GB of RAM, 8 GB of internal storage and microSD support up to 32 GB. Weighing 144 g, the device measures 137 mm × 74.6 mm × 10.5 mm. The phone includes an FM radio and, for connectivity, Bluetooth 4.1.

Due to the phone itself being entertainment-centric, the Xperia E4 includes many applications, including Walkman, PartyShare, xLoud, Clear Audio+ and Camera apps found on the software of the phone.

== Software ==
The Xperia E4 comes with Sony's Timescape UI (or Xperia UI) and Google's Android 4.4.4 KitKat with some notable applications additions such as Sony's Media applications (Walkman, Album, and Videos). Additionally, the device also includes Sony's battery stamina mode, which increases the phone's standby time up to 4 times and Ultra Stamina Mode which they advertise to have up to 2 days of battery life with mid-usage. Several Google applications (such as Google Chrome, Google Play, Google Voice Search, Google Search, Google Maps for Mobile with Street view and Latitude, Google Talk application) also come preinstalled with the device.

There has been no news on Android 5.0 Lollipop to be released for this device.

== Issues ==
The Xperia E4 experienced a software glitch where the device will not respond to clicks from the physical power button. This software glitch has still not been resolved and only affects a few devices.

Other problems were experienced by some Xperia E4 users who complained that their device battery life drained too quickly despite stamina mode being enabled. To resolve the issue the device had to be soft (factory) reset by the user.

== See also ==
- Sony Xperia
