= Sony Xperia T3 =

Android smartphone

- Brand: Sony
- Manufacturer: Sony Mobile Communications
- Type: Phablet
- First released: July 2014
- Predecessor: Sony Xperia T2 Ultra
- Successor: Sony Xperia C4
- Related: Sony Xperia C3; Sony Xperia M2
- Form factor: Slate
- Operating system: Android 4.4.2 "KitKat"
- System-on-chip: Qualcomm MSM8928-2 Snapdragon 400
- CPU: 1.4 GHz quad-core
- GPU: Adreno 305
- Memory: 1 GB RAM
- Storage: 8 GB
- Battery: non-user removable Li-ion 2500 mAh
- Rear camera: 8 MP with LED flash 1080p video recording @ 30 frames/s
- Front camera: 1.1 MP 720p video recording @ 30 frames/s
- Display: 5.3 in (130 mm) diagonal
- Codename: Seagull
- Website: Official website

The Sony Xperia T3 is an Android smartphone developed by Sony Mobile Communications. It was announced in June 2014 and was released in July 2014.

== Specifications ==
=== Hardware ===
The Sony Xperia T3 has a 5.3-inch IPS LCD, Quad-core 1.4 GHz Cortex-A7 Qualcomm Snapdragon 400 processor, 1 GB of RAM and 8 GB of internal storage that can be expanded using microSD cards up to 32 GB. The phone has a 2500 mAh Li-ion battery, 8 MP rear camera with LED flash and 1.1 MP front-facing camera. It is available in Black, White, Purple colors.

=== Software ===
The Xperia T3 was initially shipped with Android 4.4.2 (KitKat) with Sony's custom launcher on top. Some notable additions to the software include Sony's Media applications – Walkman, Album and Videos. NFC is also a core feature of the device, allowing 'one touch' to mirror what is on the smartphone to compatible TVs or play music on a NFC wireless speaker. Additionally, the device includes a battery stamina mode which increases the phone's standby time up to 4 times. Several Google applications (such as Google Chrome, Google Play, Google search (with voice), Google Maps and Google Talk) already come preloaded.

On 13 August 2014, the Xperia T3 got a minor bug-fixing update which moved the version number from 18.2.A.1.14 to 18.2.A.1.18 on the HSPA+ variant (D5102) and from 18.1.A.1.17 to 18.1.A.1.21 on the LTE variant (D5103, D5106).

On 8 January 2015, the Xperia T3 got an update which moved the Android version to 4.4.4 (KitKat). The version number is 18.1.A.2.32 for the HSPA+ variant and 18.1.A.2.25 for the LTE variant, respectively.

There won't be an update to Android 5.0 Lollipop.
