= Sony Xperia M5 =

Android smartphone by Sony

- Brand: Sony
- Manufacturer: Sony Mobile
- Type: Touchscreen smartphone
- Series: Sony Xperia
- Predecessor: Sony Xperia M4 Aqua
- Successor: Sony Xperia X
- Form factor: Slate
- Dimensions: 145 mm (5.7 in) H 72 mm (2.8 in) W 7.6 mm (0.30 in) D
- Weight: 142.5 g (5.03 oz)
- Operating system: Android 5.0 "Lollipop"; Upgradable to Android 6.0 "Marshmallow"
- System-on-chip: MediaTek HelioX10 MT6795
- CPU: 2.0 GHz octa-core 64-bit ARMv8-A Cortex-A53 Cores
- GPU: PowerVR Rogue G6200
- Memory: 3 GB LPDDR3 RAM
- Storage: 16 GB
- Removable storage: Up to 200 GB microSDXC
- Battery: Non-user removable Li-ion 2600 mAh
- Rear camera: 21.5MP; Sony Exmor IMX230; 1.12 μm pixel size f/2.0 aperture Phase-detection Autofocus + Contrast-detection Autofocus; 720p@120fps 1080p@60 fps 4K 2160p@30 fps
- Front camera: 13 MP; Sony Exmor IMX135; 1.136 μm pixel size f/2.0 aperture 1080p@30fps video
- Display: 5.0 in (130 mm) IPS LCD; Full HD 1920x1080 (441ppi); TRILUMINOS™ Display; Sony BRAVIA Mobile engine 2 Scratch-resistant glass 24-bit depth colours
- Connectivity: Wi-Fi; DLNA; GPS/GLONASS; NFC; Bluetooth 4.1; USB 2.0 (Micro-B port, USB charging); USB OTG; 3.50 mm (0.138 in) Headphone Jack CTIA/AHJ
- Data inputs: Multi-touch, capacitive touchscreen, proximity sensor
- Model: E5603, E5606, E5653 (single sim); E5633, E5643, E5663 (dual sim)
- Codename: Holly
- Other: List: Available in black, white and gold IP65 / IP68 (Dust protected, Water jet protected & Waterproof) Sony Exmor RS for Mobile TrackID
- Website: Official website

The Sony Xperia M5 is a water & dust resistant high-end Android-based smartphone manufactured by Sony serving as the successor to the Xperia M4 Aqua. The phone was unveiled on 3 August 2015 along with the Xperia C5 Ultra. The phone is marketed as a “super mid-range” phone, which is between its predecessor, the M4 Aqua, and the flagship, the Xperia Z5.

Like its predecessor, the Xperia M4 Aqua, the Xperia M5 is water-resistant and dustproof, and has an IP rating of IP65 and IP68. The key highlight of the phone is the 21.5 megapixel rear camera and ISO 3200 along with 0.25 second Hybrid Autofocus that utilizes phase detection autofocus.

== Specifications ==
=== Hardware ===
The Xperia M5 features a 5.0 inch (130 mm) 1080p display. It is dust and water-resistant with an IP rating of IP65 and IP68 and is powered by the 2.0 GHz octa-core MediaTek HelioX10 MT6795 processor which is backed by 3 GBs of RAM. The M5 includes a non-removable 2600 mAh battery. The rear camera of the M5 is 21.5 megapixel with a Sony Exmor RS image sensor along with ISO 3200 and f/2.2 aperture. The devices also features hybrid autofocus that utilizes phase detection autofocus and contrast detection autofocus that can focus the object within 0.25 seconds. The device comes with 16 GB internal storage along with microSDXC card expansion up to 200 GB.

=== Software ===
The Xperia M5 comes preinstalled with Android 5.0 "Lollipop" along with Sony's custom UI and software. Sony released an update to Android 6.0 "Marshmallow" for the device.

== Sales ==
The dual-sim variant of the Xperia M5 was launched in India and Hong Kong on 9 September 2015. Sony also announced in early 2016 to sell the M5 in the UK despite originally planning not to sell in UK.

== Issues ==
The handset occasionally suffers from automatic shutoff and cannot be restarted or turned on unless connected to a power source via a USB cable. Sony has commented on the issues and has confirmed that most of their first batch of this phone that was released had issues and were faulty and that customers with affected handsets were able to have them repaired by replacing the faulty battery with a new one at a Sony Service Center.

== Reception ==
The Xperia M5 was generally well received. Sony was praised for the handset's improved camera, longer battery life and more generous internal storage.

Preceded by none	Sony super mid-range Smartphone; 2015	Succeeded by Sony Xperia X
Preceded by Sony Xperia M4 Aqua	Sony Xperia M Series Smartphone; 2015	Succeeded by none
