= Sony Ericsson Xperia Mini =

Smartphone model by Sony Ericsson

Sony Ericsson Xperia Mini/Mini pro
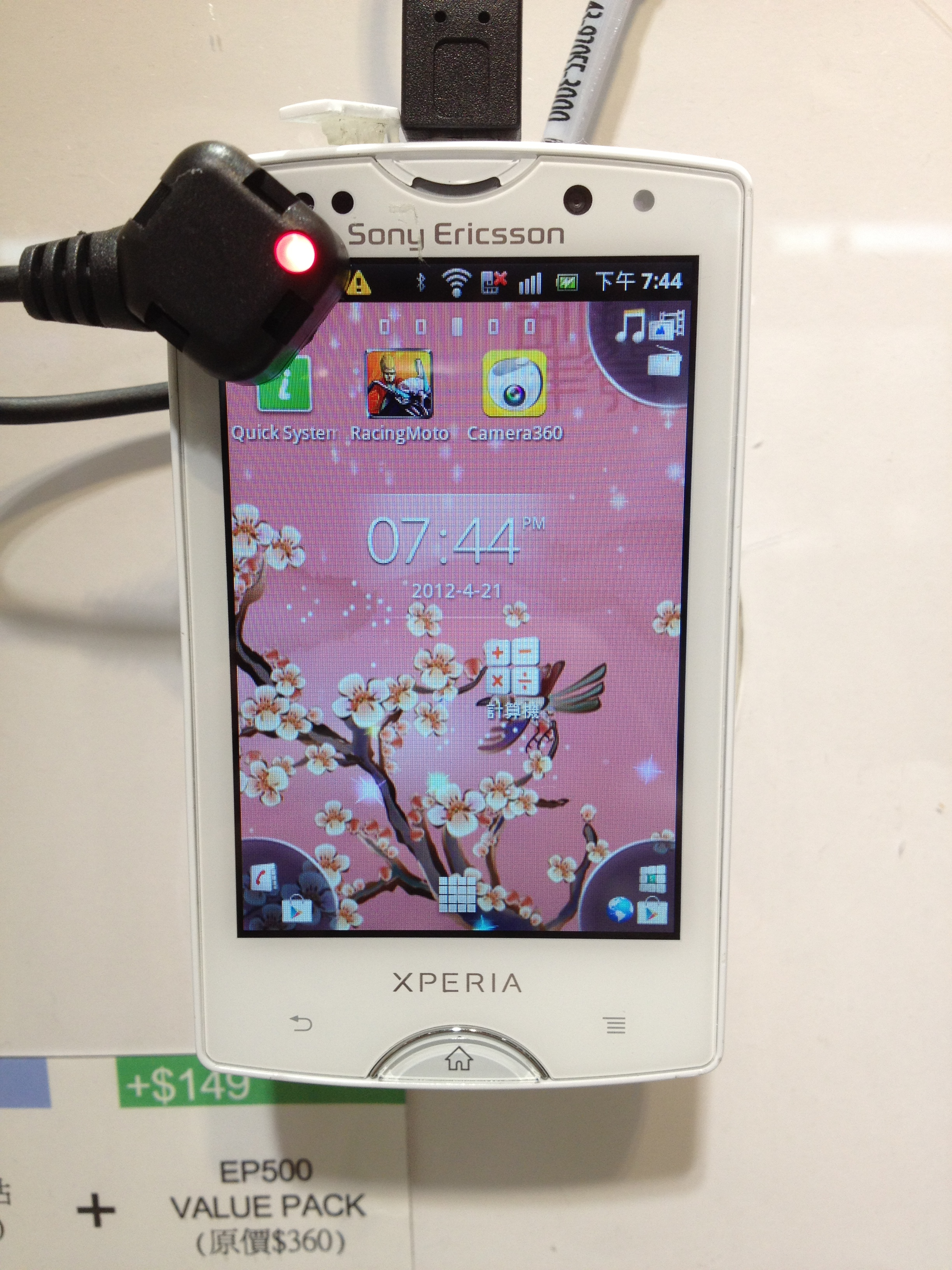
- Manufacturer: Sony Mobile Communications
- Series: Sony Ericsson Xperia
- Availability by region: "Europe" August 2011
- Successor: Sony Xperia tipo Sony Xperia miro
- Related: Xperia X10 Mini Pro
- Form factor: Slate smartphone (black, white, blue, dark pink)
- Dimensions: 88 mm (3.5 in) H 52 mm (2.0 in) W 16 mm (0.63 in) D
- Weight: 99 g (3.5 oz)
- Operating system: Android 2.3.4 (Gingerbread) officially upgradeable up to Android 4.0.4 (Ice Cream Sandwich) unofficially upgradeable to Android 4.0.4 (Ice Cream Sandwich) via CyanogenMod 9, Android 4.1.2 (JellyBean) via CyanogenMod 10, Android 4.2.2 (JellyBean) via CyanogenMod 10.1, Android 4.3.1 (JellyBean) via CyanogenMod 10.2, Android 4.4.2 (Kitkat) via CyanogenMod 11, Android 5.0.2 (Lollipop) via CyanogenMod 12, Android 5.1.1 (Lollipop) via Cyanogenmod 12.1
- CPU: Qualcomm MSM8255 1 GHz Scorpion (Snapdragon S2)
- GPU: Adreno 205
- Memory: 512 MB of RAM
- Storage: 1 GB ROM, 320 MB user-available
- Removable storage: microSD, 2 GB (supports up to 32 GB)
- Battery: EP500; 1,200 mAh 4.5 Wh, 3.7 V Internal rechargeable li-po User replaceable
- Rear camera: 5 MP 2592×1944 px 8× digital zoom Autofocus; Flash LED illumination 720p video recording Face recognition Geo-tagging; Image stabilization Smile detection Touch focus, Video 720p
- Display: LED-backlit LCD "Reality Display" with Mobile BRAVIA Engine, 3.0 in (76 mm) diagonal 320×480 (192 ppi) px HVGA; 3:2 aspect-ratio 16M colors
- Connectivity: Wi-Fi (802.11 b/g/n); Bluetooth 2.1 with A2DP; Quad-band GSM/GPRS/EDGE; 850/900/1800/1900 MHz
- Data inputs: Multi-touch, capacitive touchscreen, accelerometer
- Codename: Smultron

The Sony Ericsson Xperia Mini/Mini pro (model ST15i/SK17i) is an Android smartphone from Sony Ericsson, released in August 2011. The Xperia mini has a "mobile BRAVIA engine" driving a 320×480 pixels 3-inch (76 mm) capacitive touch-screen, a 1 GHz Snapdragon S2 processor, a 5 megapixel camera, 512 MB of onboard RAM, and comes stock with a 2 GB microSD card (compatible with up to 32 GB). The phone is one of Sony Ericsson's environmentally friendly "Greenheart" range, featuring devices made of recycled materials, longer battery life and low-energy chargers, as well as minimal use of paper through reduced packaging and the replacement of the traditional printed user manual with one stored on the phone.

== Overview ==
The Xperia Mini (st15i) runs Android 2.3 "Gingerbread" but can be upgraded to Android 4.0, "Ice Cream Sandwich." It was touted as being an ultra-small smartphone that still retained higher-end specifications and performance.
