= Sony Xperia C5 Ultra =

Smartphone model

- Brand: Sony
- Manufacturer: Sony Mobile Communications
- Type: Phablet
- Series: Sony Xperia
- First released: 14 August 2015; 10 years ago
- Availability by region: 14 August 2015; 10 years ago (Hong Kong)
- Predecessor: Sony Xperia T2 Ultra; Sony Xperia C4
- Successor: Sony Xperia XA Ultra
- Related: Sony Xperia M5
- Form factor: Slate
- Dimensions: 164.2 mm (6.46 in) H 79.6 mm (3.13 in) W 8.2 mm (0.32 in) D
- Weight: 187 g (6.6 oz)
- Operating system: Android 5.0 "Lollipop"; Upgradable to Android 6.0 "Marshmallow"
- System-on-chip: MediaTek MT6752
- CPU: 1.7 GHz octa-core
- GPU: Mali T760-Mp2 700MHz
- Memory: 2 GB RAM
- Storage: 16 GB
- Removable storage: Up to 200 GB microSDXC
- Battery: non-user removable Li-ion 2930 mAh
- Rear camera: 13 MP with LED flash 1080p video recording @ 30 frames/s
- Front camera: 13 MP with LED flash 1080p video recording @ 30 frames/s
- Display: 6.0 in (150 mm) diagonal
- Connectivity: Wi-Fi; DLNA; GPS/GLONASS; NFC; Bluetooth 4.1; USB 2.0 (Micro-B port, USB charging); USB OTG; 3.50 mm (0.138 in) headphone jack
- Data inputs: Multi-touch, capacitive touchscreen, proximity sensor
- Model: E5553, E5506 (Single SIM); E5533, E5563 (Dual SIM)
- Codename: Lavender
- Other: List: Available in black, white and mint Sony Exmor RS for Mobile TrackID Sony PROselfie
- Website: Official Website

The Sony Xperia C5 Ultra is a mid-range Android phablet smartphone developed and manufactured by Sony. It serves as the successor to the Xperia C4. The phone was unveiled on 3 August 2015 alongside the Xperia M5.

The key features of the phone is the twin 13-megapixel rear and front camera and its near borderless 6.0-inch (152.4 mm) display with a width of 3 inches (79.6 mm).

== Specifications ==
=== Hardware ===
The Sony Xperia C5 Ultra has a 6.0-inch IPS LCD, an octa-core 1.7 GHz Cortex-A53 Mediatek MT6752 processor, 2 GBs of RAM and 16 GBs of internal storage that can be expanded using a microSD card of up to 256 GB. The phone has a 2930 mAh Li-ion battery, 13 MP rear camera with an LED flash and 13 MP front-facing camera with auto-focus. It is available in Black, White and Mint colors.

=== Software ===
The Sony Xperia C5 Ultra launched with Android 5.0 Lollipop. In January 2016, Android 5.1 Lollipop was released for the device. Later, in September 2016, Android 6.0 Marshmallow was released for the Xperia C5 Ultra.

== Sales ==
The phone was first released on 14 August 2015 in Hong Kong. However, two days after its launch date, the phone's pre-sales were sold out in Hong Kong. The dual SIM version of the phone launched in India on 26 August.

Preceded by Sony Xperia T2 Ultra	Sony mid-range Phablet; 2015	Succeeded by Sony Xperia XA Ultra
Preceded by Sony Xperia C4	Sony Xperia C Series Smartphone; 2015	Succeeded by none
