= Sony Xperia C3 =

Android based smartphone produced by Sony

- Brand: Sony
- Manufacturer: Sony Mobile Communications
- Type: Touchscreen smartphone
- Series: Sony Xperia
- Availability by region: July 2014 (announced); August 2014 (China)
- Predecessor: Sony Xperia C
- Successor: Sony Xperia C4
- Related: Sony Xperia M2; Sony Xperia T2 Ultra; Sony Xperia T3
- Form factor: Slate
- Dimensions: 156.2×78.7×7.6 mm (6.15×3.10×0.30 in)
- Weight: 150 g (5 oz)
- Operating system: Android 4.4.2 "KitKat" upgradeable to Android 5.1 "Lollipop"
- System-on-chip: Qualcomm Snapdragon MSM8926 400
- CPU: 1.2 GHz quad-core Krait (1.2 GHz Qualcomm MSM8926 Quad Core)
- GPU: Adreno 305
- Memory: 1 GB RAM
- Storage: 8 GB
- Removable storage: Up to 32 GB microSDXC
- Battery: non-user removable Li-ion 2500 mAh
- Rear camera: 8 MP EXMOR R with autofocus and LED flash
- Front camera: 5 MP PROselfie camera with LED Flash (720p video recording)
- Display: 5.5 in (140 mm) diagonal IPS LCD; HD 1280x720 px (267 ppi); TRILUMINOS™ display
- Connectivity: Wi-Fi; DLNA; GPS/GLONASS; NFC; Bluetooth 4.0; USB 2.0 (Micro-B port, USB charging); USB OTG; 3.50 mm (0.138 in) headphone jack, 5 pole
- Data inputs: Multi-touch, capacitive touchscreen, proximity sensor
- Model: D2502 (dual Sim), S55t, S55u
- Codename: Wukong
- Other: Available in black, white and mint Sony Exmor RS for Mobile; SteadyShot; Smile shutter Wi-Fi Miracast; FM radio

The Sony Xperia C3 is a touchscreen-enabled Android smartphone designed, developed and manufactured by Sony Mobile Communications. Codenamed "Wukong" and the successor to Sony Xperia C, it features a Snapdragon 400 processor.

The Xperia C3 was announced on July 8, 2014, marketed as the "world's best selfie smartphone". Unlike other Sony smartphones, it has a 5MP front camera, as well as a 8MP rear camera. It was released in August 2014, starting in China and followed by other markets.

== Specifications ==
=== Hardware ===
The Sony Xperia C3 has a 5.5-inch HD IPS display, 1.2 GHz quad core Snapdragon 400 processor, Adreno 305 GPU, 1 GB RAM, 8 GB internal storage, 8 MP rear camera and 5 MP front-facing camera.

=== Software ===
Sony Xperia C3 ships with Android 4.4.2 KitKat and is upgradable to Android 5.1 Lollipop.

Preceded by Sony Xperia C	Sony Xperia C3; 2014	Succeeded by Sony Xperia C4
