= Sony Xperia C4 =

Smartphone model

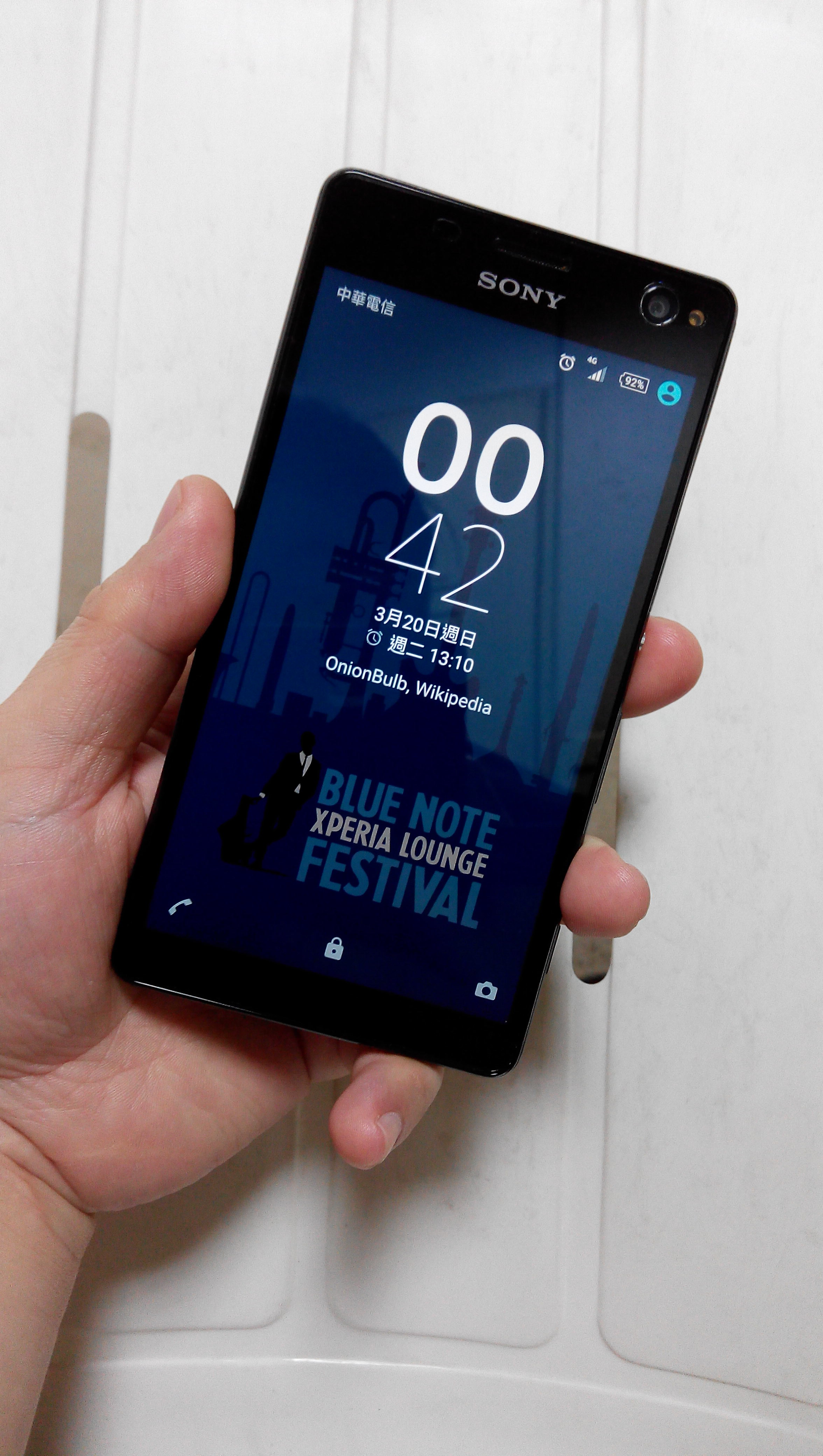
- Brand: Sony
- Manufacturer: Sony Mobile Communications
- Type: Smartphone
- Series: Sony Xperia
- Predecessor: Sony Xperia C3; Sony Xperia T3
- Successor: Sony Xperia C5 Ultra
- Form factor: Slate
- Dimensions: 150.3 mm (5.92 in) H 77.4 mm (3.05 in) W 7.9 mm (0.31 in) D
- Weight: 147 g (5.2 oz)
- Operating system: Android 5.0 Lollipop; Upgradable to Android 6.0 Marshmallow
- System-on-chip: MediaTek MT6752
- CPU: 1.7 GHz octa-core
- GPU: MaliT760-Mp2 700MHz
- Memory: 2 GB RAM
- Storage: 16 GB
- Removable storage: Up to 200 GB microSDXC
- Battery: Li-ion 2600 mAh
- Rear camera: 13 MP with LED flash 1080p video recording @ 30 frames/s
- Front camera: 5 MP with LED flash 1080p video recording @ 30 frames/s
- Display: 5.5 in (140 mm) diagonal
- Connectivity: Wi-Fi; DLNA; GPS/GLONASS; NFC; Bluetooth 4.1; USB 2.0 (Micro-B port, USB charging); USB OTG; 3.50 mm (0.138 in) headphone jack
- Data inputs: Multi-touch, capacitive touchscreen, proximity sensor
- Model: E5303, E5306, E5353 (Single SIM); E5333, E5343, E5363 (Dual SIM)
- Codename: Cosmos
- Other: List: Available in black, white and mint Sony Exmor RS for Mobile TrackID Sony PROselfie
- Website: Official Website

The Sony Xperia C4 is a mid-range Android smartphone developed and manufactured by Sony and it serves as the successor of the Xperia C3. The phone was unveiled on 6 May 2015, and it is marketed as the "Selfie Smartphone". Three months later, Sony unveiled its successor, the Xperia C5 Ultra.

The key features of the phone are the 25 mm 5 megapixel front camera and 1.7 GHz octa-core processor powered by MediaTek MT6752.

== Features ==
=== Hardware ===
The Sony Xperia C4 has a 5.5-inch IPS LCD, Octa-core 1.7 GHz Cortex-A53 Mediatek MT6752 processor, 2 GB of RAM and 16 GB of internal storage that can be expanded using microSD cards up to 256 GB. The phone has a 2600 mAh Li-ion battery, 13 MP rear camera with LED flash and 5 MP front-facing camera with auto-focus. It is available in Black, White, Mint colors.

=== Software ===
On September 16, 2016, Sony announced that they were beginning the rollout of Android 6.0 Marshmallow to the Xperia C4 and the Xperia C4 Dual.

== Reception ==
In May 2015, Strategy Analytics conducted an independent consumer test to evaluate the quality of the front camera of the device. After the test, the device was claimed to be the "World's best selfie smartphone" and the "Worlds best smartphone for selfies".

== Sales ==
On 26 May 2015, the dual version of the device released in India along with the dual version of the Xperia M4 Aqua.
