= Sony Xperia T2 Ultra =

Android smartphone

- Brand: Sony
- Manufacturer: Sony Mobile Communications
- Type: Phablet
- First released: March 2014
- Successor: Sony Xperia T3; Sony Xperia C5 Ultra
- Related: Sony Xperia C3; Sony Xperia M2; Sony Xperia Z2
- Form factor: Slate
- Dimensions: 165.2 mm (6.50 in) H 83.8 mm (3.30 in) W 7.7 mm (0.30 in) D
- Weight: 171.7 g (6.06 oz)
- Operating system: Android 4.3 "Jelly Bean"
- System-on-chip: Qualcomm MSM8928 Snapdragon 400
- CPU: 1.4 GHz quad-core
- GPU: Adreno 305
- Memory: 1 GB RAM
- Storage: 8 GB
- Removable storage: Up to 32 GB microSDXC
- Battery: non-user removable Li-ion 3000 mAh
- Rear camera: 13 MP with LED flash 1080p video recording @ 30 frames/s
- Front camera: 1.1 MP 720p video recording @ 30 frames/s
- Display: 6.0 in (150 mm) diagonal
- Website: Official website

The Sony Xperia T2 Ultra is an Android smartphone developed by Sony Mobile Communications. It was announced in January 2014 and was released in March 2014.

== Specifications ==
=== Hardware ===
The Sony Xperia T2 Ultra has a 6.0-inch IPS LCD, Quad-core 1.4 GHz Cortex-A7 Qualcomm Snapdragon 400 processor, 1 GB of RAM and 8 GB of internal storage that can be expanded using microSD cards up to 32 GB. The phone has a 3000 mAh Li-ion battery, 13 MP rear camera with LED flash and 1.1 MP front-facing camera. It is available in Black, White, Purple colors.

=== Software ===
Sony Xperia T2 Ultra ships with Android 4.3 Jelly Bean and is upgradable to Android 5.1 Lollipop.
