= List of mobile phones with FWVGA display =

FWVGA is an abbreviation for Full Wide Video Graphics Array which refers to a display resolution of 854x480 pixels. 854x480 is approximately the 16:9 aspect ratio of anamorphically "un-squeezed" NTSC DVD widescreen video and considered a "safe" resolution that does not crop any of the image. It is called Full WVGA to distinguish it from other, narrower WVGA resolutions which require cropping 16:9 aspect ratio high-definition video (i.e. it is full width, albeit with considerable reduction in size). The 854 pixel width is rounded up from 853.333...3. (480 x 16)/(1 x 9) = 7680/9 = 853 1/3. Since a pixel must be a whole number, rounding up to 854 ensures inclusion of the entire image.

The following is a list of smartphones which incorporate FWVGA displays.

- Cloudfone Geo 401q+
- Alcatel one touch idol MINI (OT-6012)
- Archos 43
- Cherry Mobile Me Pop
- Cherry Mobile Thunder 2.0
- Energizer U506S
- Gigabyte GSmart G1362
- Huawei M886 Mercury
- Huawei u8860
- Huawei Ascend Y550 LTE
- Huawei Y3 II
- Lenovo A526
- LG GD880 Mini
- Oppo A59
- Micromax A100
- Micromax A110
- Micromax A74 Canvas Fun
- Motorola Bravo
- Motorola Defy
- Motorola Droid | Sholes | Tao | A855 | Milestone A853
- Motorola Droid 2 | Milestone 2 (A953)
- Motorola Droid X
- Motorola Motoluxe XT685
- Motorola Razr D3 it appears some versions of this phone are FWVGA and some are WVGA.
- Multilaser MS50
- Nokia C1 (2020).
- Nokia Lumia 630
- Nokia N9
- Peace Mobile by Dr.Zakir Naik
- QMobile Noir i2 Power
- QMobile Noir A10
- QMobile Noir A500
- Sony Xperia M
- Sony Ericsson Xperia X10
- Sony Ericsson Xperia Arc
- Sony Ericsson Xperia Play
- Sony Ericsson Xperia Neo
- Sony Ericsson Xperia Pro
- Sony Ericsson Xperia ray
- Sony Ericsson Xperia neo V
- Sony Xperia U
- Sony Xperia Sola
- Sony Xperia Neo L
- Sony Xperia J
- Sony Xperia L
- Torque Droidz Wave
- Wiko Cink King

== See also ==
- Graphic display resolutions
- List of mobile phones with WVGA display; FWVGA (854x480) is a subset of WVGA (e.g. 800x480, 848x480, or 854x480).
