= Sony Xperia neo L =

Android smartphone from 2012

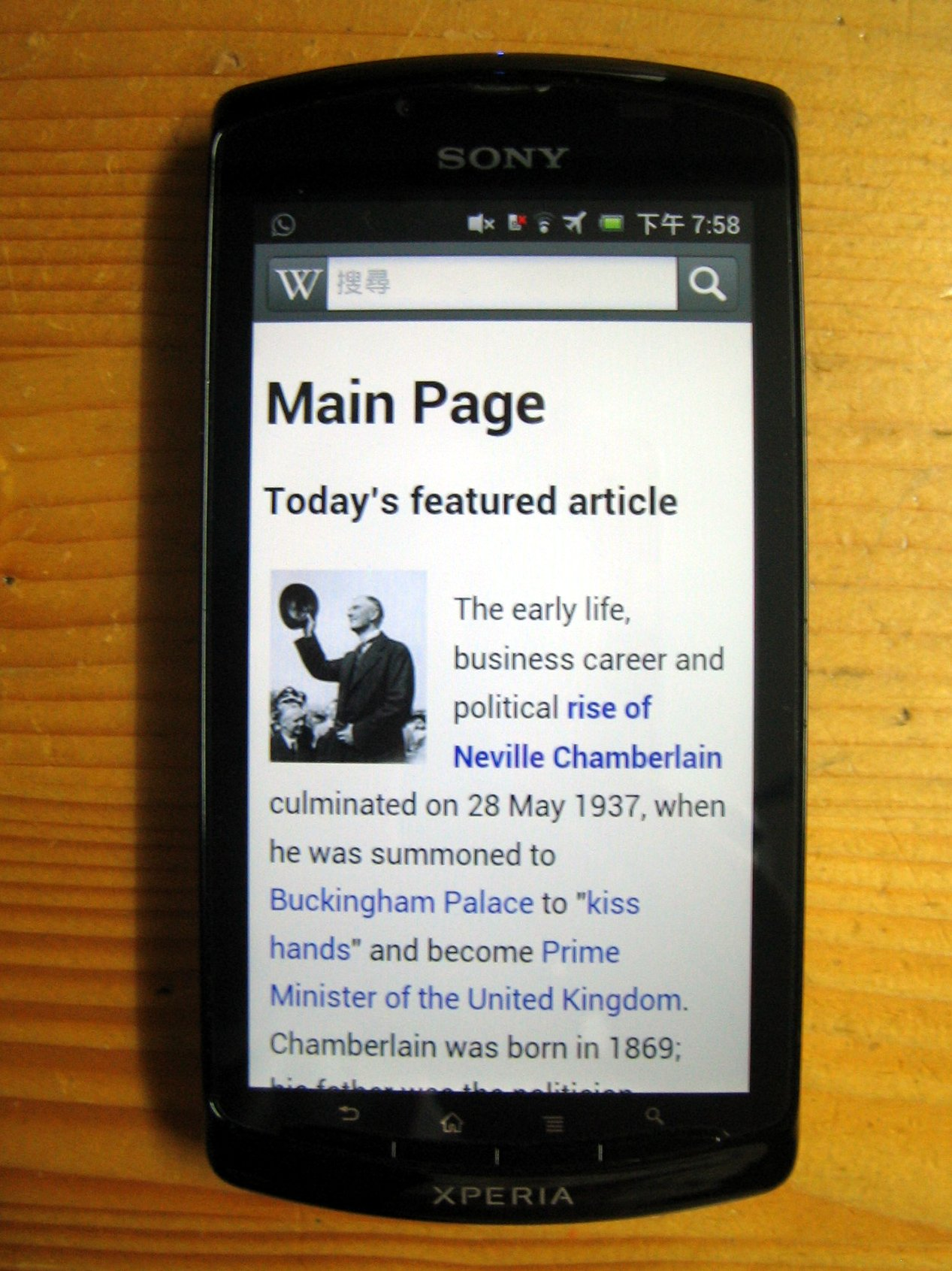
- Sony Xperia neo L (Black)
- Manufacturer: Sony Mobile
- Type: Smartphone
- Series: Sony Xperia
- First released: 21 March 2012; 14 years ago (Announced); 1 June 2012; 14 years ago (Released)
- Predecessor: Sony Ericsson Xperia neo V
- Related: Sony Ericsson Xperia neo Sony Ericsson Xperia Play
- Compatible networks: 2G: GSM 850/900/1800/1900; 3G: HSDPA 900/2100
- Form factor: Candy bar
- Colors: Black, White
- Dimensions: 121 mm × 61.1 mm × 12.2 mm (4.76 in × 2.41 in × 0.48 in)
- Weight: 131.5 g (4.64 oz)
- Operating system: Android 4.0.4 Ice Cream Sandwich
- System-on-chip: Qualcomm MSM8255 Snapdragon
- CPU: 1 GHz Scorpion
- GPU: Adreno 205
- Memory: 512 MB RAM
- Removable storage: 1 GB internal storage (380 MB user available), supports up to 32GB microSD
- Battery: Li-ion 1500 mAh Standard removable battery
- Rear camera: 5 megapixels with 2592х1944 pixels, autofocus, LED flash, 720p video recording at 30 fps
- Front camera: VGA
- Display: 5 inch 320x480 px "Reality Display" TFT LCD at 245 PPI
- Connectivity: microUSB, 3.5 mm audio jack, Bluetooth 2.1 with A2DP, Wi-Fi 802.11 b/g/n
- Data inputs: Multi-touch capacitive touchscreen, Accelerometer
- Model: MT25i

The Sony Xperia neo L is a mid-range Android smartphone designed, developed and manufactured by Sony Mobile Communications. The Xperia neo L as first announced in March 2012 and was released in June 2012. The Xperia neo L was first made available in China and was later on released globally.

== Specifications ==
=== Design ===
The Sony Xperia neo L has a similar design with Sony Ericsson Xperia Play without a PSP slider, more than its processors Sony Ericsson Xperia Neo. It has a slightly elongated body with a glossy plastic finish. However, the Xperia neo L features a larger screen and is heavier than its predecessors.

The Sony Xperia neo L has a 4-inch display; there are four physical keys and a "Xperia" logo on the lower bezel of the screen while there is a "Sony" logo, an earpiece, a front-facing camera and sensors on the upper bezel of the screen. On the side frame; there is a microUSB port at the left, there is a volume rocker and a power button at the right, there is a 3.5 mm headphone jack at the top and there is a microphone and a groove to remove the back cover at the bottom. The camera, the speaker and the LED flash are located at the back along with the "Xperia" logo and the liquid energy logo of the Ericsson.

The Sony Xperia neo L is available in black and white. It measures 121 mm × 61.1 mm × 12.2 mm and weighs 131.5 grams.

=== Hardware ===
The Sony Xperia neo L features a 4-inch LED-backlit LCD screen with a resolution of 480 × 854 pixels and a pixel density of 245 ppi. The device has a 5 megapixel rear camera capable of taking 720p HD videos at 30 fps and it also features a VGA front-facing camera for video calling. The Xperia neo L comes with Qualcomm MlSM8255 Snapdragon SoC with 1 GHz Scorpion CPU and Adreno 205 GPU. There is also 512 MB of RAM and 1 GB of internal storage with 380 MB available to the user; the internal storage is expandable up to 32 GB with microSD cards.

=== Software ===
The Sony Xperia neo L runs on Android 4.0.4 Ice Cream Sandwich with Sony's custom interface just like the Xperia devices on 2011. Also with several Google applications (such as Google Play, Google search (with voice), Google Maps and Google Talk) already come preloaded. The Xperia neo L is also DLNA certified.

== Reception ==
The Sony Xperia neo L received mixed reviews.

Gadgets360 reviewed the Sony Xperia neo L, giving it 3 points out of 5. The audio quality was praised but the physical buttons under the display was criticized. Battery life and Android Ice Cream Sandwich out of the box were considered as the pros while the build quality and lack of tap to focus were considered as the cons of the device.

GSMArena reviewed the Sony Xperia neo L and considered it as a "decent" phone. Audio quality and the camera image quality were praised. However; the viewing angles of the display and the back cover were criticized, and it was stated that the video recording wasn't very good

Victor H. from PhoneArena reviewed the Sony Xperia neo L and gave it 6 points out of 10. He praised the display and the battery life but criticized the build quality, lack of oleophobic coating on the display, poor viewing angles of the display and the camera quality. He concluded that the Xperia neo L had a very good display for the class but the camera quality and the performance were "the possible dealbreakers".

== See also ==
- Sony Ericsson Xperia neo
- Sony Ericsson Xperia neo V
