= Sony Ericsson Xperia Neo V =

Android smartphone

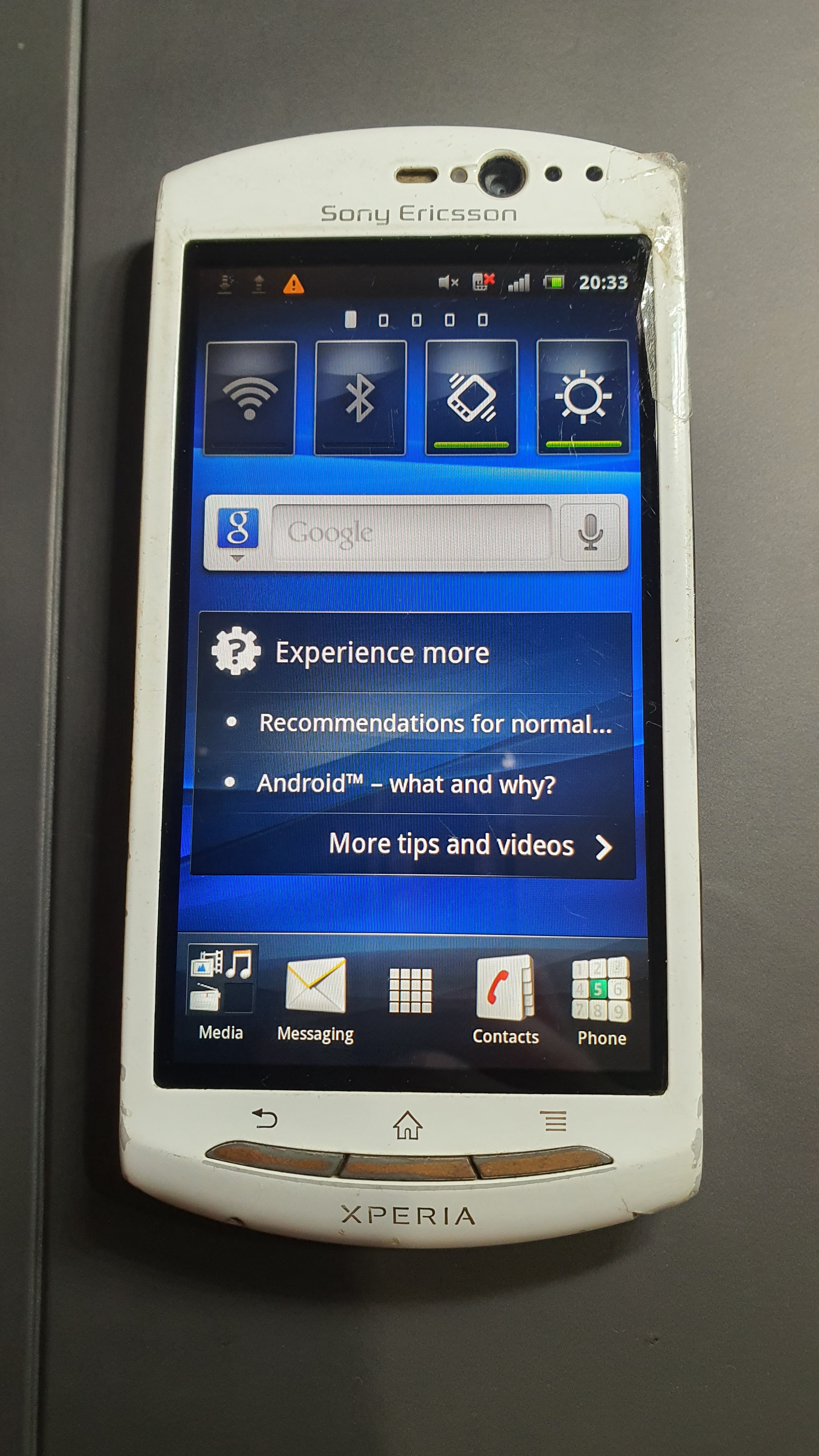
- Manufacturer: Sony Ericsson
- Series: Sony Ericsson Xperia
- First released: October 2011; 14 years ago
- Discontinued: 2012; 14 years ago
- Successor: Sony Xperia neo L Sony Xperia sola
- Dimensions: 116×57×13 mm (4.57×2.24×0.51 in)
- Weight: 126 g (4 oz)
- Operating system: Android 2.3.4 (Gingerbread); Officially upgradeable up to Android 4.0.4 (Ice Cream Sandwich) Unofficially upgradeable to: Android 4.0.4 (Ice Cream Sandwich) via CyanogenMod 9, Android 4.1.2 (JellyBean) via CyanogenMod 10, Android 4.2.2 (JellyBean) via CyanogenMod 10.1, Android 4.3.1 (JellyBean) via CyanogenMod 10.2, Android 4.4.2 (Kitkat) via CyanogenMod 11.
- CPU: Qualcomm Snapdragon MSM8255 1GHz Scorpion
- GPU: Adreno 205
- Memory: 512 MB (RAM)
- Storage: 320 MB (ROM) + Up to 32 GB on microSD memory card
- Battery: Li-Ion 1500 mAh
- Rear camera: 5.0 MP (2592х1944) autofocus, LED flash
- Front camera: VGA
- Display: 3.7 inch 854×480 px LED-backlit LCD 16M colors
- Connectivity: Bluetooth 2.0 with A2DP microUSB 2.0; 3.5 mm audio jack aGPS; Wi-Fi 802.11 b/g/n HDMI GSM 850 / 900 / 1800 / 1900 HSDPA 900 / 2100 – MT11i HSDPA 850 / 1900 / 2100 – MT11a
- Data inputs: Multi-touch capacitive touchscreen, Accelerometer

Sony Ericsson Xperia Neo V is a smartphone by Sony Ericsson that supersedes the Sony Ericsson Xperia Neo. It was launched in October 2011 as a cheaper albeit alternative variant of the more expensive Sony Ericsson Xperia Neo. Sony scaled down the camera from 8.1 MP to 5.0 MP in the case of the Neo V so as to keep production costs down. The Xperia Neo V came pre-installed with Android 2.3 "Gingerbread" and upgradeable to Android 4.0.4 "Ice Cream Sandwich" (June 2012).

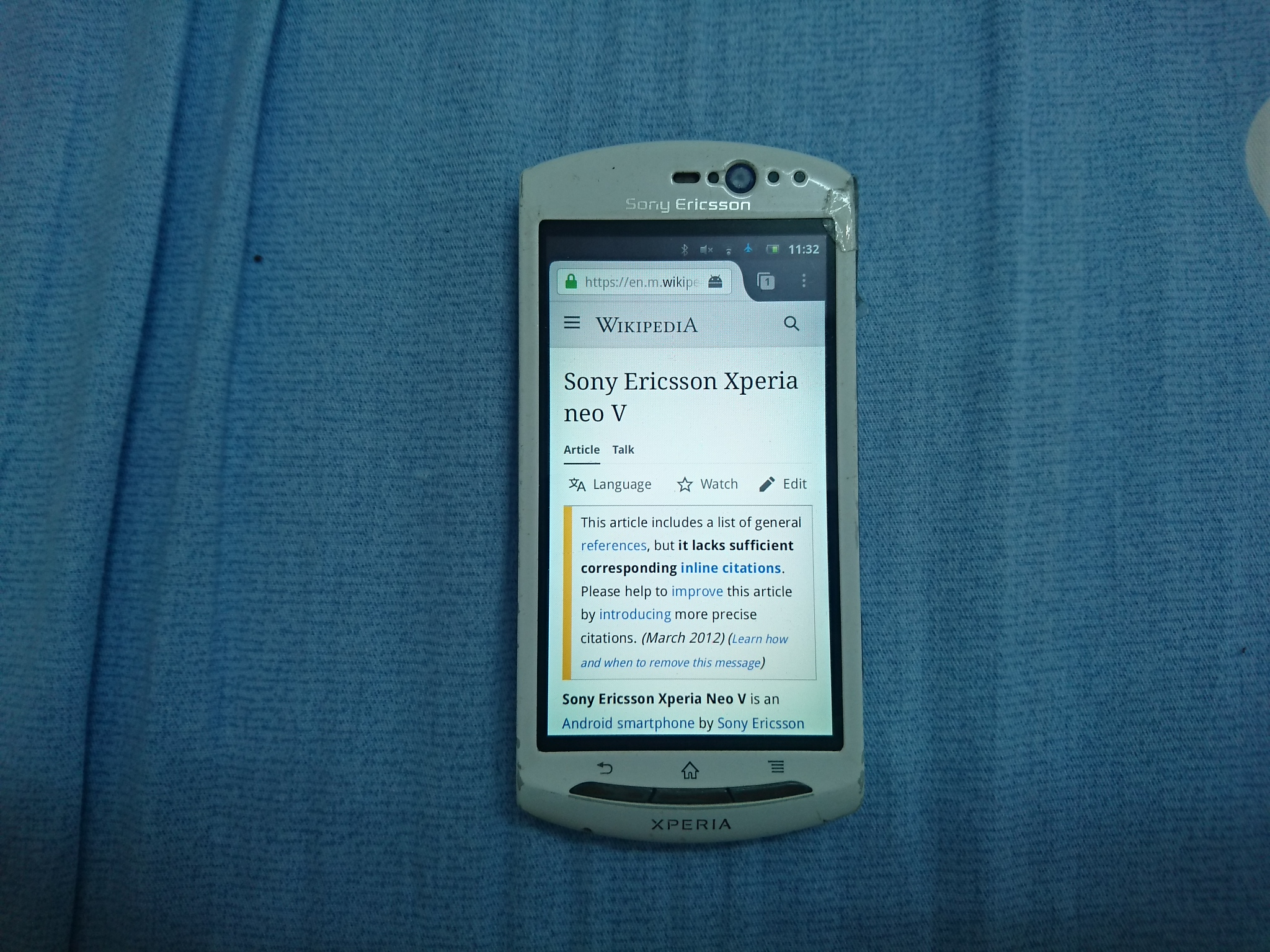
The Sony Ericsson Xperia Neo V displaying its own Wikipedia page

== Hardware ==
The Xperia Neo V can be taken as a cheaper, scaled-down version of the Neo, although it has many of the same features found in the Xperia Arc, the Xperia Play and the Sony Ericsson Xperia Neo (including the mobile) Sony Bravia engine. It sports a 5.0-megapixel camera capable of recording 720p high definition video. It also features a front-facing VGA camera excluded from the Xperia Arc which allows for video chat. The graphics on the phone are handled by an Adreno 205.

== Reception ==
Generally, the phone has received positive reviews from sites such as GSMArena, being praised for its competitive price and the latest (at that time) 2.3 (Gingerbread) upgradeable to 4.0 (Ice Cream Sandwich) Android operating system.

== See also ==
- Galaxy Nexus
- Sony Xperia neo L
- List of Android devices
