= RGBW =

RGBW may refer to:

== Red, green, blue and white ==
- RGBW sensor, a color filter array
- RGBW, an LED strip light with four channels
- RGBW color wheel, in a DLP projector
- PenTile RGBW, in the PenTile matrix family
- RGBW sub-pixels, in WhiteMagic display technology

== Other uses ==
- Royal Gloucestershire, Berkshire and Wiltshire Regiment, a former regiment of the British Army

== See also ==
- RGB, a color model
