= Sony Ericsson Xperia Neo =

Android smartphone

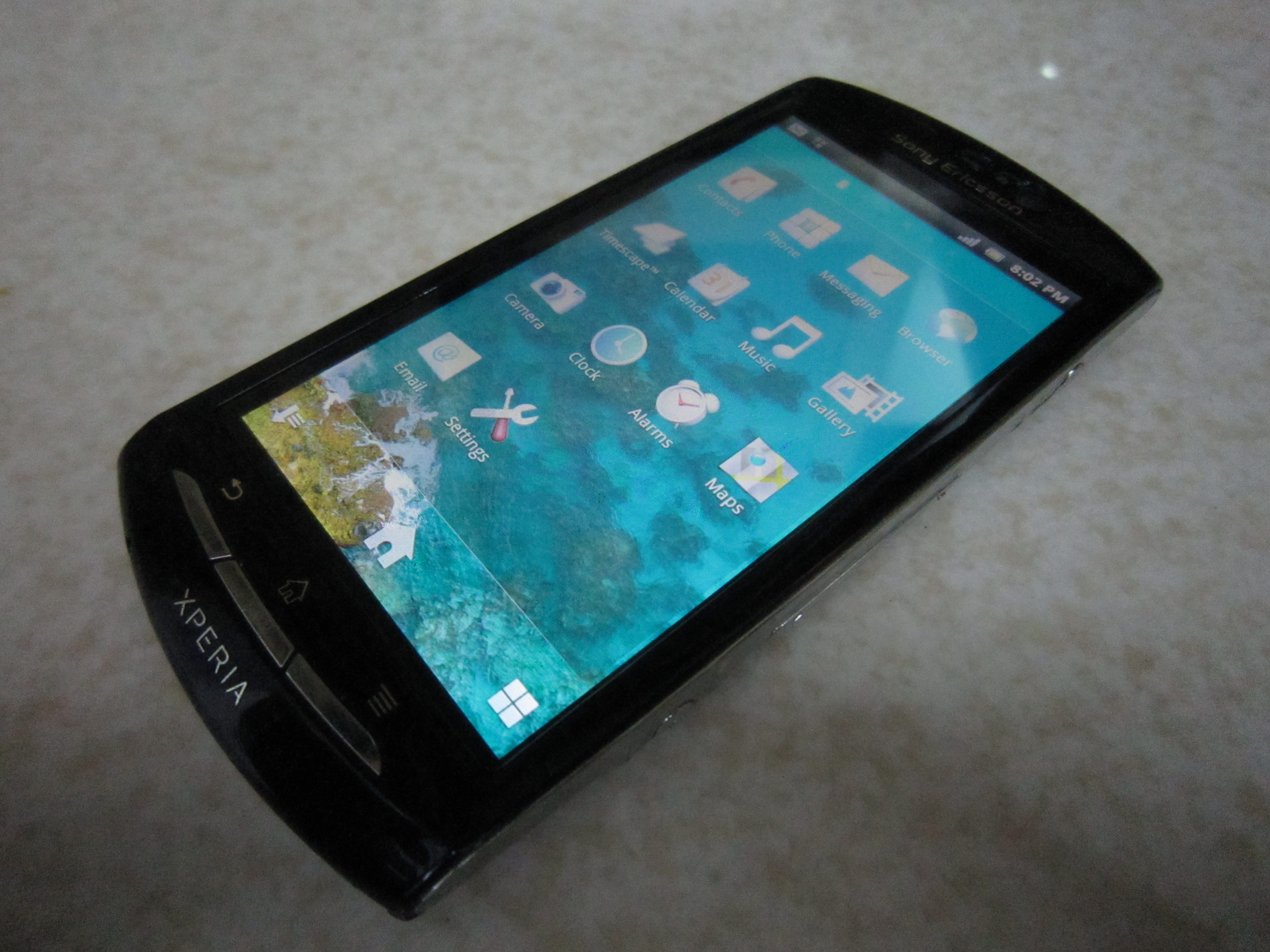
- A Sony Ericsson Xperia Neo
- Developer: Sony Ericsson
- Manufacturer: Sony Ericsson
- Type: Smartphone
- Series: Sony Ericsson Xperia
- First released: March 2011; 15 years ago
- Discontinued: November 2011; 15 years ago
- Predecessor: Sony Ericsson Vivaz
- Successor: Sony Xperia P
- Related: Sony Ericsson Xperia neo V
- Form factor: Smartphone
- Dimensions: 116×57×13 mm (4.57×2.24×0.51 in)
- Weight: 126 g (4 oz)
- Operating system: Android 2.3.4; Officially upgradeable up to Android 4.0.4 (Ice Cream Sandwich) Unofficially upgradeable to: Android 4.0.4 (Ice Cream Sandwich) via CyanogenMod 9, Android 4.1.2 (JellyBean) via CyanogenMod 10, Android 4.2.2 (JellyBean) via CyanogenMod 10.1, Android 4.3.1 (JellyBean) via CyanogenMod 10.2, Android 4.4.4 (Kitkat) via CyanogenMod 11.
- System-on-chip: Qualcomm Snapdragon MSM8255 1GHz Scorpion
- GPU: Adreno 205
- Memory: 512 MB (RAM)
- Storage: 380 MB (ROM) + Up to 32 GB on microSD memory card
- SIM: miniSIM
- Battery: Li-Ion 1500 mAh
- Rear camera: 8-MP (3264x2448) autofocus, LED flash, Exmor R
- Front camera: MicroUSB Type-B charging port up to 5W (standard charging speed)
- Display: 3.7 inch 854×480px (265 ppi density) LED-backlit LCD 16M colors
- Connectivity: Bluetooth 2.1 with A2DP microUSB 2.0; 3.5 mm audio jack aGPS; Wi-Fi 802.11 b/g/n HDMI GSM 850 / 900 / 1800 / 1900 HSPA 850 / 1900 / 2100
- Data inputs: Multi-touch capacitive touchscreen, Accelerometer
- Codename: Hallon

Sony Ericsson Xperia Neo is an Android smartphone by Sony Ericsson, superseding the Sony Ericsson Vivaz, released in 2010 and preceding the Sony Xperia P, released in 2012. It was launched in early 2011, although due to supply chain disruptions from the 2011 Tōhoku earthquake and tsunami, it was delayed until fall 2011 in most markets. During its development it was codenamed Hallon.

== Hardware ==
The Xperia Neo has many of the same features found in the Xperia Arc and the Xperia Play including the mobile Sony Bravia engine and an 8-megapixel camera capable of recording 720p high-definition video. It also features a front-facing VGA camera - excluded from the Xperia Arc - which allows for video chat.

== Reception ==
Generally, the phone has received positive reviews from sites such as GSMArena, being praised for its camera and Android operating system as opposed to the Symbian equivalent used for the Vivaz.

== Software ==
The phone shipped with Android 2.3 and an official update to Android 4.0 was made available in May 2012. Sony Ericsson, by then going under the name Sony Mobile, did not make any higher Android version updates available for the Xperia neo. Unofficial updates up to Android 4.4 are available.

== Xperia Neo V ==
A similar model named Xperia Neo V was released in October 2011. Unlike the Xperia Neo, it has a 5-megapixel camera without Exmor R. Sony Ericsson has stated that it is due to a shortage of 8-megapixel camera sensors. The other specifications are exactly the same.

== See also ==
- Sony Ericsson Xperia Arc
- Sony Ericsson Xperia ray
- Sony Ericsson Xperia pro
- List of Android devices
- Qualcomm Snapdragon S2
