= Sony Xperia M2 =

Android smartphone produced by Sony

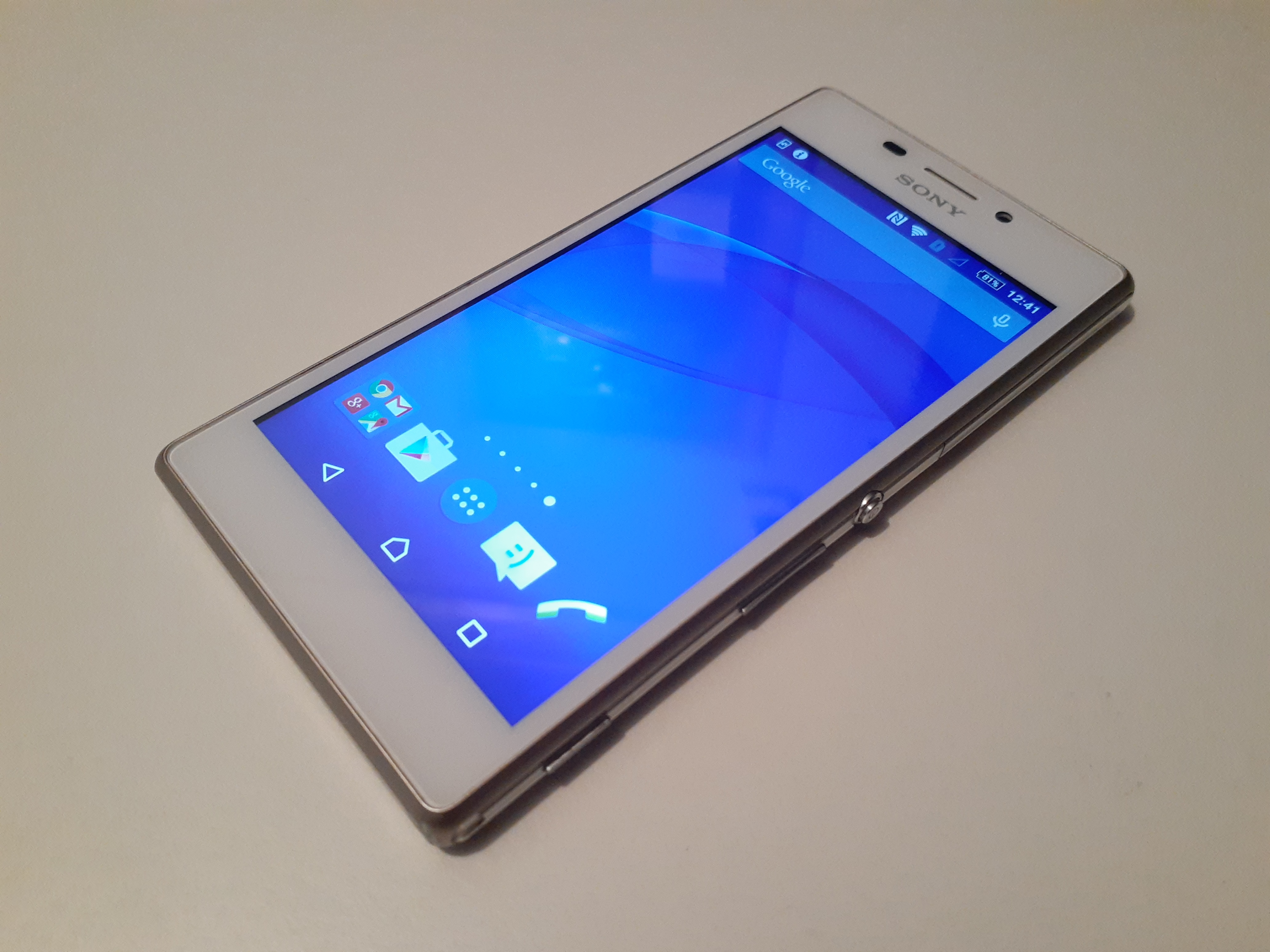
- Sony Xperia M2
- Brand: Sony
- Manufacturer: Sony Mobile Communications
- Type: Touchscreen smartphone
- Series: Sony Xperia
- Predecessor: Sony Xperia M
- Successor: Sony Xperia M4 Aqua
- Form factor: Slate, OmniBalance
- Dimensions: 139.7×71.1×8.6 mm (5.50×2.80×0.34 in)
- Weight: 148 g (5 oz)
- Operating system: Android 4.3 "Jelly Bean", upgradable to Android 5.1.1 "Lollipop"
- System-on-chip: Qualcomm Snapdragon MSM8926 400
- CPU: 1.2 GHz quad-core Krait
- GPU: Adreno 305
- Memory: 1 GB RAM
- Storage: 8 GB
- Removable storage: Up to 32 GB microSDXC
- Battery: non-user removable Li-ion 2300 mAh
- Rear camera: 8 MP; 1080p video recording @ 30 frames/s
- Front camera: 0.3 MP
- Display: 4.8 in (120 mm) diagonal LCD qHD 960 x 540 px, Corning Gorilla Glass 3
- Connectivity: Wi-Fi; DLNA; GPS/GLONASS; NFC; Bluetooth 4.0; USB 2.0 (Micro-B port, USB charging); USB OTG; 3.50 mm (0.138 in) headphone jack, 5 pole
- Data inputs: Multi-touch, capacitive touchscreen, proximity sensor
- Model: D2303, D2305, D2306 30 April 2014; 12 years ago
- Codename: Eagle
- Other: Available in black, white and purple

The Sony Xperia M2 is a mid-range 4G Android smartphone manufactured by Sony which was unveiled on 24 February 2014 at the Mobile World Congress, Barcelona, Spain. It boasts of Sony's new Lifelog app, launched alongside the Sony Xperia Z2 and Sony Xperia Z2 Tablet. The Xperia M2 succeeds the Sony Xperia M with a faster processor and an improved camera.

== Technical specifications ==
=== Hardware ===
The Xperia M2 features a 4.8-inch qHD resolution 540×960 px display and a pixel density of 229 ppi. It features an 8-megapixel camera capable of HDR image snapshots and 1080p Full HD video recording. Xperia M2 is a sealed-body cellphone with a 1.2 GHz Qualcomm Snapdragon 400 quad-core processor, Adreno 305 GPU, 1GB LPDDR3 RAM and 8 GB of internal flash storage inside packed together with a 2300 mAh non-removable battery. Also it features microSDHC slot which support up to 32 GB of additional space. Weighing 148 g, the phone measures 139.7 mm by 71.1 mm by 8.6 mm.

=== Software ===
- Android OS 5.1.1
- NFC, Wi-Fi and Bluetooth supported

== Variants ==
Commercial Name	Codename	Model Number	Reference
Xperia M2	Eagle Rita SS 1258	D2305	
Xperia M2	Eagle Gina SS 1,3,5,7,8,20	D2303	
Xperia M2	Eagle Rex SS 4,7,17	D2306	
Xperia M2	Eagle Rex T SS 4,7,17	D2316	
Xperia M2 Dual	Eagle Rita DS 1258	D2302	

Preceded by Sony Xperia M	Sony Xperia M2; 2014	Succeeded by Sony Xperia M4 Aqua
