= Sony Xperia SP =

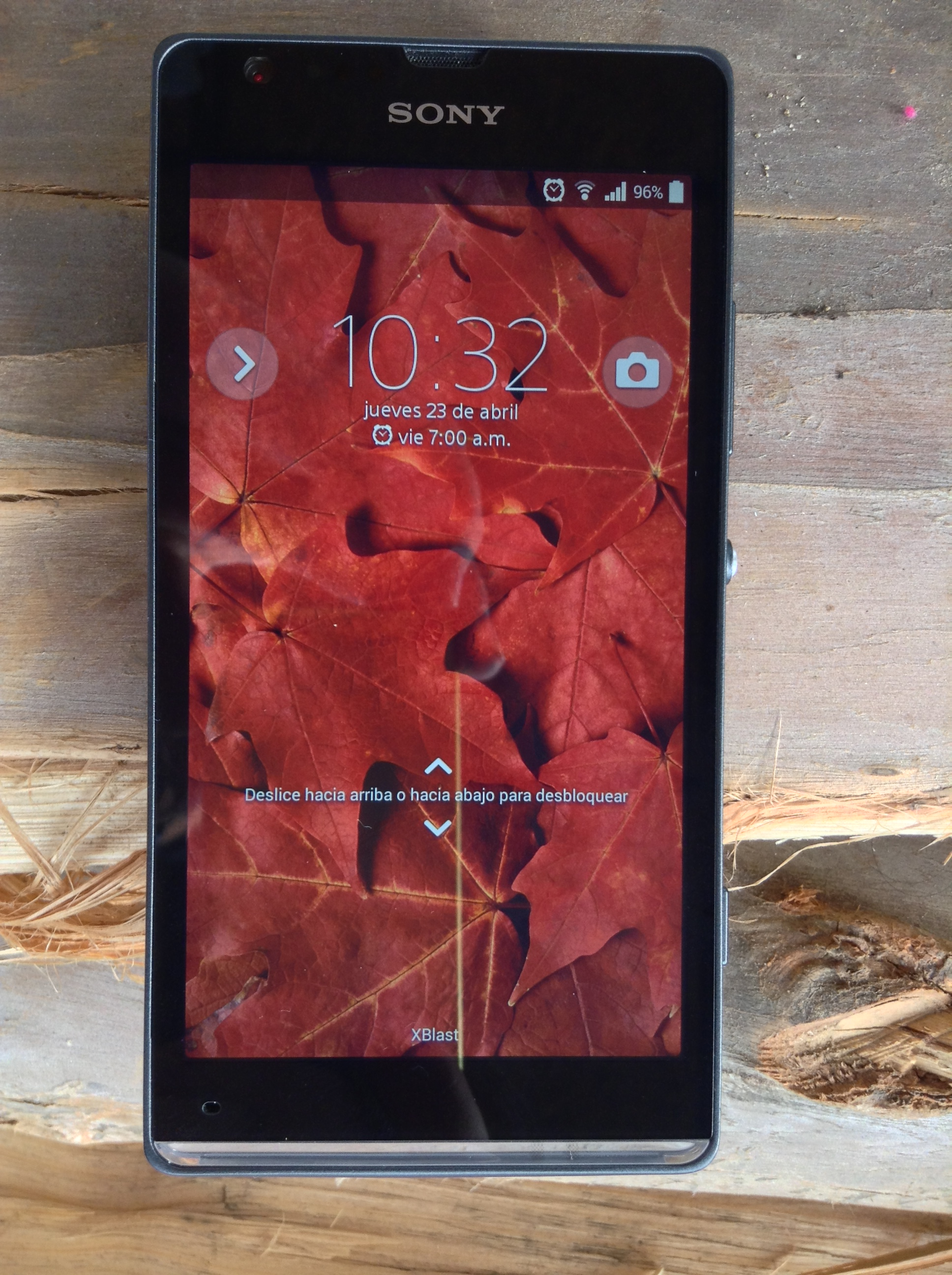
- Image of the Sony Xperia SP
- Brand: Sony
- Manufacturer: Sony Mobile
- Type: Smartphone
- Series: Xperia
- First released: 18 March 2013; 13 years ago
- Availability by region: 26 April 2013; 13 years ago (Singapore); 29 April 2013; 13 years ago (UK); 17 July 2013; 12 years ago (Canada)
- Predecessor: Sony Xperia P Sony Xperia sola
- Successor: Sony Xperia T3
- Related: Sony Xperia S Sony Xperia M
- Compatible networks: 2G Network (C5302, C5303, C5306); 3G Network (C5302, C5303, C5306); 4G Network (C5303, C5306)
- Form factor: Bar
- Dimensions: 130.6 mm (5.14 in) H 67.1 mm (2.64 in) W 9.98 mm (0.393 in)
- Weight: 155 g (5.47 oz)
- Operating system: Android 4.1 "Jelly Bean"; Upgradable to Android 4.3 Jelly Bean
- CPU: 1.7 GHz Dual-Core Snapdragon S4 Pro (MSM8960T)
- GPU: Adreno 320
- Memory: 1 GB RAM
- Storage: 8 GB (5.8 user available)
- Removable storage: microSD support up to 32 GB
- Battery: 2370 mAh
- Rear camera: 8 MP with LED flash 1080p video recording @ 30 frames/s 16x digital zoom, Exmor RS sensor, HDR
- Front camera: 0.3 megapixels (VGA)
- Display: 4.6 in (120 mm) TFT LCD; 1280x720 px (319 ppi)
- Connectivity: NFC, MHL, Wi-Fi Direct
- Data inputs: Touch, Accelerometer
- Model: C5302 (HSPA), C5303 (LTE), C5306 (LTE)
- Codename: HuaShan

The Sony Xperia SP (codenamed "HuaShan") is a mid-range smartphone from Sony Mobile. It was announced on 18 March 2013. It is powered by a 1.7 GHz Qualcomm Snapdragon S4 Pro dual-core processor. It has 1 GB RAM, an 8-megapixel camera with Exmor RS sensor and a 4.6-inch reality display with a 720p resolution with Sony's Mobile Bravia Engine 2.

== Design ==
Sony used co-moulding technology to create a unique solid design. Featuring a design similar to its predecessor, the Xperia SP has an aluminium frame with a plastic polycarbonate removable back and a transparent strip that runs across the bottom of the device. The transparent strip acts as the antenna of the phone, and notification LED bar and also illuminates when music is being played.

== Specifications ==
=== Hardware ===
The Xperia SP features a 4.6-inch capacitive touchscreen display with a resolution of 1280 by 720 pixels, displaying 319 pixels per inch and features Sony's Mobile BRAVIA® Engine 2 for better image and video viewing and is protected by Corning Gorilla glass. The phone comes with an 8-megapixel camera capable of 16 times digital zoom, HD 1080p video recording, HDR for images and it features Sony Exmor RS™ for mobile image sensor. It also features a 0.3-megapixel VGA front-facing camera.

On the inside, the Xperia SP comes with a 1.7 GHz dual-Core Snapdragon S4 Pro, 1 GB of RAM (768 MB usable on Android 4.1, 839 MB usable on Android 4.3), 8 GB of internal storage (5.8 GB usable), microSD support up to 32 GB and a 2,370 mAh battery.

=== Software ===
The Xperia SP comes preloaded with Sony's version of Android 4.1 "Jelly Bean" with some notable applications additions such as Sony's media applications (Walkman, Albums, Movies) and Sony Select. Featuring NFC, the device is able to mirror what is on the smartphone screen to compatible TVs or play music wireless on a NFC speaker. Several Google applications (like Google Chrome, Google Play, Google Voice Search, Google search, Google Maps for Mobile with Street view and Latitude, Google Talk application) also comes preloaded with the device. For connectivity, the phone supports LTE, Bluetooth 4.0, DLNA MHL support and it is also PlayStation Certified.

== Software update ==
On 16 January 2014, Sony revealed through its official Twitter account that the update to Android 4.3 "Jelly Bean" will be rolled out from end of January or early February for the Xperia SP along with Xperia T, Xperia TX and Xperia V update. On 11 February 2014, Sony started rolling the update in Australia and eventually to other markets. The software support page was recently changed from Android 4.4 KitKat under investigation to Android 4.3 latest & final version, meaning the Xperia SP will not be upgraded above the current Android version officially.
