= Sony Xperia U =

Smartphone model

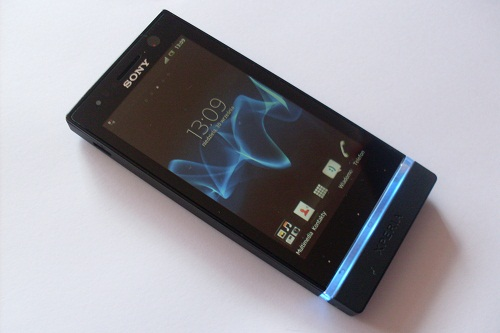
- Sony Xperia U
- Manufacturer: Sony Mobile
- Type: Smartphone
- Series: Xperia
- First released: 15 May 2012 (14 years ago)
- Availability by region: Worldwide
- Predecessor: Sony Ericsson Xperia ray
- Successor: Sony Xperia J
- Related: Sony Xperia S Sony Xperia P Sony Xperia sola
- Compatible networks: ST25i: GSM 850, 900, 1800, 1900; HSDPA 900 / 2100; ST25a: HSDPA 850 / 1900 / 2100
- Form factor: Bar
- Dimensions: 112×54×12 mm (4.41×2.13×0.47 in)
- Weight: 110 g (4 oz)
- Operating system: Android 2.3.7 "Gingerbread" Upgradeable to Android 4.0.4 "Ice Cream Sandwich" (with Sony PC Companion or Bridge for Mac)
- CPU: 1 GHz Dual-core NovaThor ARM Cortex-A9
- GPU: Single Core Mali 400
- Memory: 512 MB (392MB for system, 120MB for GPU)
- Storage: 8 GB (up to 4 GB available for the user with 50 GB free Cloud storage for life*)
- Removable storage: No
- Battery: 1290 mAh, removable
- Rear camera: 5 MP, autofocus, LED flash, face and smile detection, and geo-tagging
- Front camera: 0.3 MP, VGA
- Display: 3.5-inch; FWVGA (854 x 480 pixels) (280 ppi); 16,777,216 colour TFT; Reality display with Bravia Engine
- Connectivity: 3.5G, Wi-Fi 802.11 b/g/n with Hotspot, micro-USB v2.0 with USB OTG support, DLNA
- Data inputs: Touch
- Other: Sony Entertainment Networks – Music and Video Unlimited*
- References: www.sonymobile.com/gb/products/phones/xperia-u/specifications

The Sony Xperia U ST25i (ST25a in the United States), codenamed Kumquat during its development, is an Android-based smartphone from Sony. It was launched at the 2012 Mobile World Congress held in Barcelona, and is the second Sony-only branded smartphone after Sony acquired Ericsson's stake in Sony Ericsson in January 2012. The Xperia U has a 3.5-inch (88.9 mm) touch-screen with the mobile BRAVIA engine which optimises the picture, a 1 GHz dual core processor, a 5 mega-pixel rear camera, 0.3 mega-pixel front camera, 512 MB of RAM, and 8 GB of internal storage. The cap at the bottom of the phone is interchangeable. The phone is shipped with four caps: pink, white, yellow and black.

== Development ==
It was revealed in late 2011 that Sony Ericsson was working on the ST25i, and on 20 January 2012 a photo of a development model of the phone, codenamed Kumquat, was leaked. On 23 January, its name was revealed as Sony Xperia U. This was one of the first phones to drop the Sony Ericsson brand in favour of Sony, as, on 16 February, Sony finished buying out Ericsson Mobile Communications's share of Sony Ericsson and renamed the brand Sony Mobile Communications.

The handset was introduced in Barcelona on 28 February 2012 before the Mobile World Congress in the United Kingdom in March 2012 and was released worldwide on 15 May 2012.

== Hardware ==
The capacitive touchscreen display measures 3.5 inches with a resolution of 854 x 480 and a pixel density of 280 pixels per inch. It supports multi-touch: up to 4 fingers, features High Definition Reality Display with mobile BRAVIA engine from Sony, and is capable of displaying 16,777,216 colours. The camera has 5 megapixels and is capable of recording video at 720p High Definition. Its front-facing camera is 0.3 megapixels. The device features a STE Nova Thor U8500 1 GHz dual core processor, 512 MB RAM (split into 392MB system memory and 120MB for the GPU), Mali-400 GPU, 8 GB of internal storage (4 GB of which is available to the user) and a micro-USB connector with USB-OTG support. An illumination bar at the bottom of the phone can change color to adapt to the color rendered in the screen while using the album and walkman apps; third-party apps can be downloaded to change the colour. The phone uses a removable "BA600" Sony battery which has 1290 mAh.

== Software ==
The Xperia U was originally released with Android 2.3.7 Gingerbread, but, on 28 September 2012, Sony released an update to Android 4.0.4 Ice Cream Sandwich. Users can choose to keep the Gingerbread operating system, or, using Sony PC Companion or Bridge for Mac, they could upgrade to Ice Cream Sandwich; however, downgrading to Gingerbread is not officially supported. The Xperia U is fully Facebook integrated and features Sony's Timescape UI. It is connected to the Sony Entertainment Network, allowing users to access Music & Video Unlimited in some parts of the world. The Sony Xperia U is also DLNA certified. On 17 December 2012, Sony confirmed that the Xperia U will not be updated to Android Jelly Bean 4.1 due to hardware incompatibility. Sony later reported that the Xperia U was not updated due to the lack of RAM.

Various unofficial updates are available on XDA-Developers Forums. This way the phone can be made to run Android 4.4 KitKat or even 5.1.1 Lollipop. The only features not supported by most unofficial firmware releases are the FM Radio and Audio over Bluetooth. Installation of most updates requires an unlocked boot loader and a rooted phone.

== Design ==
Over 95% of the Xperia U front is composed of the display portion, and the back is curved slightly for comfort like on the Xperia S and the Xperia P. It has transparent strip with an illuminated light bar at the bottom, which illuminates when the user taps a button, or when viewing pictures or music by picking up the dominant colour in the picture. It has an exchangeable bottom cap below the illuminated strip. The illuminated strip is used on custom ROMs to show notifications since the notification LED of the phone is too dim to be really noticeable.

== Reception ==
Xperia U generally received a positive response from critics with some calling it as a budget version of Xperia P and Xperia S. Critics praised the Xperia U for several features, such as its dual core processor, high quality display, and 5-megapixel camera, but criticized it for the lack of external storage and not having Android Ice Cream Sandwich pre-installed. Natasha Lomas of CNET gave the phone 4 out of 5, saying that "for Android lovers looking for a budget smartphone for dainty snacking on apps and mobile websites, the Xperia U is a worthy contender. It fits the budget and is cheerful, cute as a button and – provided you're not too demanding of it – fleet of foot."

== Storage ==
The Sony Xperia U has 8 gigabytes of internal storage. 4 GB are available to the user and are internally handled by the phone like an SD card. 2 GB are reserved for the Android OS, and the remaining 2 GB are used for downloaded apps. The phone supports MTP, but this can unofficially be changed on rooted phones so that the 4GB are accessible from the computer like an SD card.

USB-OTG is also supported with separately-sold adapters. Some custom ROMs support file systems like NTFS for this storage, so large external hard drives can be used with the phone too. USB mice and keyboards are also supported when connected with an adapter.

| Preceded by Sony Ericsson Xperia ray | Sony Xperia U 2012 | Succeeded by Sony Xperia J |
