= Sony Xperia L =

Android smartphone produced by Sony

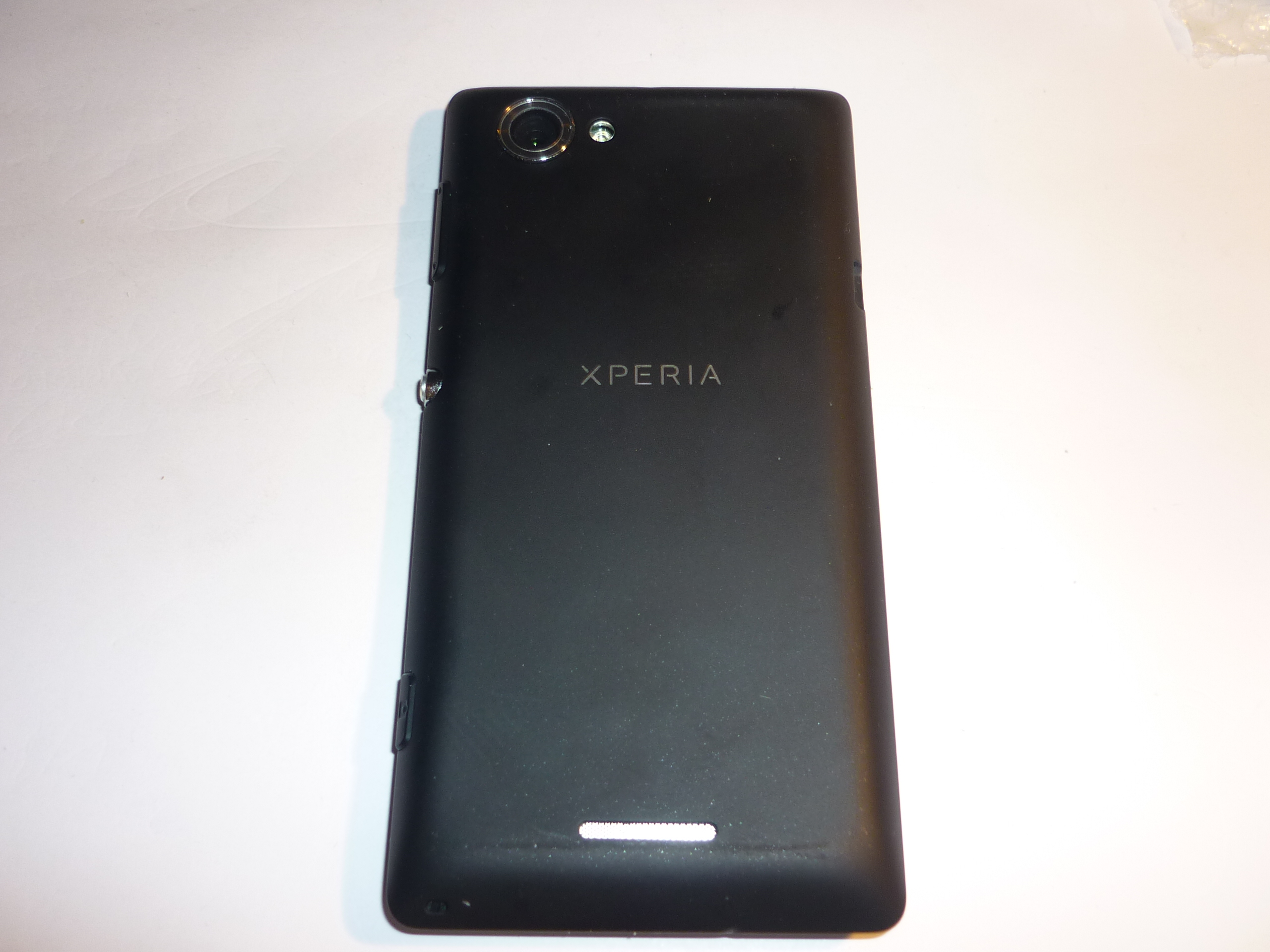
- Xperia L
- Brand: Sony
- Manufacturer: Sony Mobile Communications
- Type: Smartphone
- Series: Xperia
- First released: 13 March 2013
- Predecessor: Sony Xperia J
- Successor: Sony Xperia C, Sony Xperia L2
- Related: Sony Xperia SP, Sony Xperia ZL
- Compatible networks: UMTS HSPA+ 900 (Band VIII), 2100 (Band I) Mhz (not available in all markets) UMTS HSPA+ 850 (Band V), 1700 (Band IV), 1900 (Band II), 2100 (Band I) (not available in all markets) GSM GPRS/EDGE 850, 900, 1800, 1900 MHz
- Form factor: Bar
- Dimensions: 128.7 x 65 x 9.7 mm (5 × 2 x 0.37 inches)
- Weight: 137 g (5 oz)
- Operating system: Android 4.1.2 "Jelly Bean", Upgradable to Android 4.2.2 "Jelly Bean"
- System-on-chip: Qualcomm Snapdragon S4 Plus MSM8230
- CPU: 1 GHz Dual-Core Krait
- GPU: Adreno 305
- Memory: 1 GB RAM LPDDR2
- Storage: 8 GB (5.8 user available)
- Removable storage: up to 32 GB microSD/HC
- Battery: 1750 mAh Li-Ion
- Rear camera: 8 MP with Exmor RS Sensor & LED Flash
- Front camera: VGA
- Display: 480 x 854 pixels, 4.3 inches (~228 ppi pixel density)
- External display: TFT LCD capacitive touchscreen
- Connectivity: HSPA+ Wi-Fi a/b/g/n dual band NFC Bluetooth 4.0 GPS DLNA microUSB
- Codename: TaoShan
- SAR: 0.79 W/kg (head),1.38 W/kg (body)

Sony Xperia L (C2104/C2105) (codename "taoshan") is a budget oriented Android smartphone manufactured by Sony, announced in March 2013 and launched in May 2013.

== Hardware ==
It has a 4.3.-inch TFT capacitive touchscreen display with a resolution of 854 by 480 pixels (228 ppi). It is powered by a 1 GHz dual core Snapdragon S4 Plus processor with 1GB LPDDR2 RAM and Adreno 305 GPU. It comes with Android 4.1.2 Jelly Bean (up to 4.2.2) as its operating system. It has an 8 megapixel Exmor RS sensor with HDR and the ability to shoot 720p videos and a VGA front camera with a LED flash. The device has an inbuilt storage of 8 GB (5.8 GB user available, split between 1.57 GB device and 4.01 GB internal memory) and expandable storage of up to 32 GB via microSD. It features the Sony Arc design and the signature Sony aluminium power button. The device supports NFC allowing "one touch" to mirror what is on the smartphone to compatible TVs or play music on an NFC wireless speaker. A 1750 mAh battery powers the phone. Additionally, Xperia L includes a battery "Stamina" mode, which can increase its standby time. The phone supports 2G, 3G, HSPA+, Wi-Fi 802.11 a/b/g/n, Wi-Fi Direct, DLNA, Wi-Fi hotspot, and Bluetooth 4.0. It is available in white, black and red colors. It has an LED notification light at the bottom of the screen.

== Software ==
It includes many of the Sony's media applications such as Walkman, Sony Music, Music Unlimited, Video Unlimited and Sony LIV. Several Google applications (such as Google Chrome, Google Play, Google Now, Google Maps and Google Talk) already come pre-loaded. The device is PlayStation certified. The phone supports A-GPS. The phone runs on Android 4.1.2 out of the box. An Android 4.2.2 Jellybean update was released in October 2013 for the Xperia L.

=== AOSP (Android Open Source Project) ===
On 13 December 2013 Sony Mobile Communications added Sony Xperia L to its 'AOSP for Xperia' programme, on which Sony stated was first device with 1 GHz Dual Core MSM8230 processor for which they had added AOSP support. It made possible for advanced users i.e. with unlocked phones to build and flash Android Kitkat (Android 4.4) on Xperia L. Though this software was not intended for daily use. And also that it is not a software update from Sony. It is the source code and software binaries required to build "Stock" Android from.

=== CyanogenMod ===
On 5 May 2014, FreeXperiaProject, a community for Xperia devices developing CyanogenMod for several Sony Xperia devices, announced that they will be officially supporting the Sony Xperia L from then onwards.

With FXP318 build Xperia L (codename : taoshan) was added to the list of Xperia devices FXP supports. The build brought CyanogenMod 11 to Xperia L.

The device has official stable CyanogenMod 12.1 builds, and an unofficial CyanogenMod 13 build, currently in beta.
