= Xperia Play =

Sony smartphone

Xperia PLAY R800
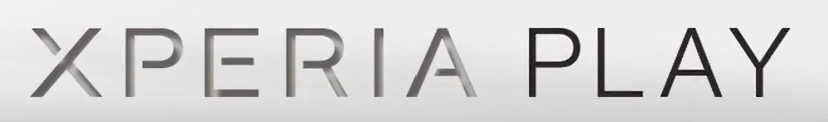

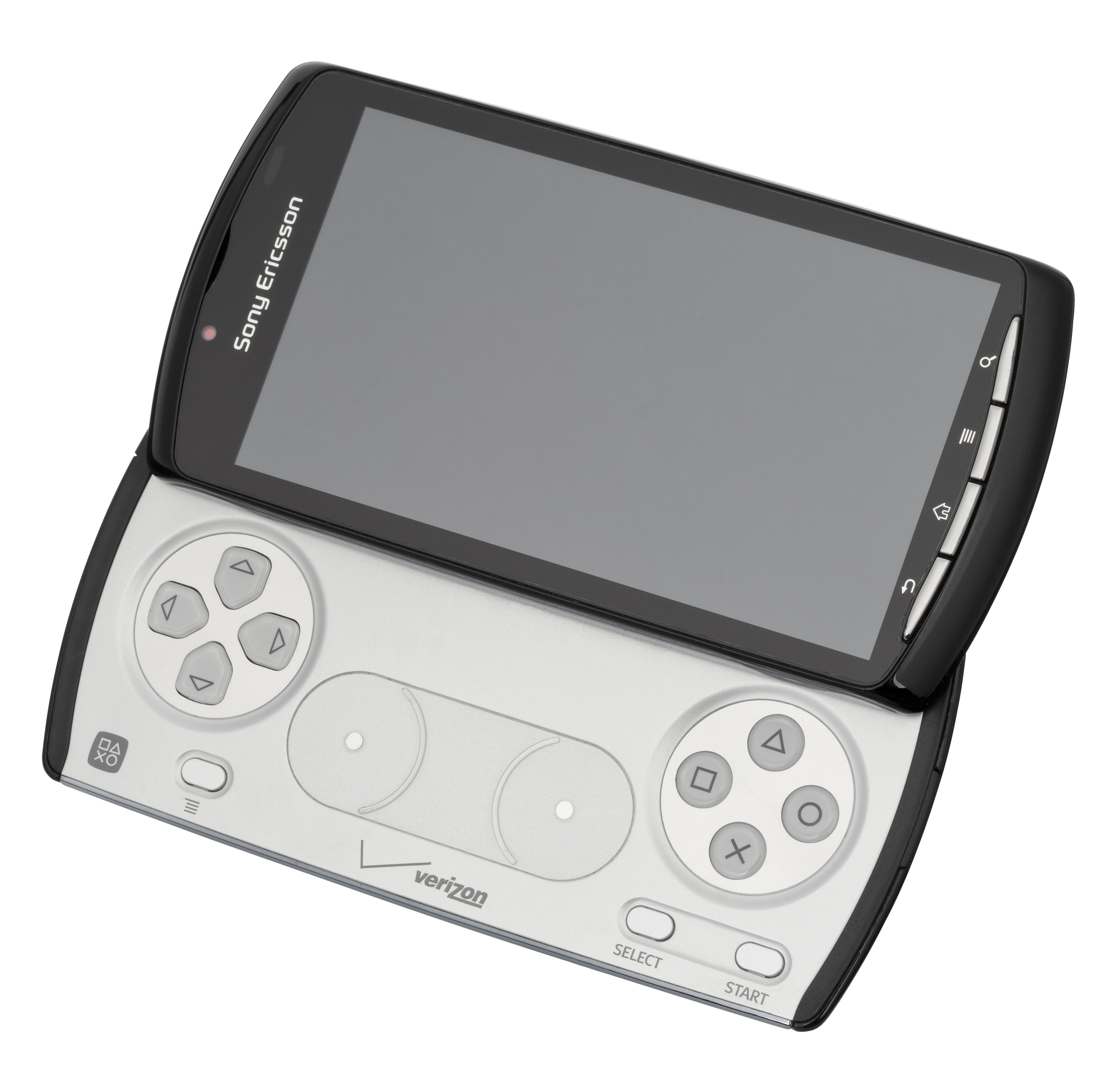
- Xperia Play in the open position
- Manufacturer: Sony Ericsson
- Type: Smartphone
- Series: Xperia
- First released: April 1, 2011; 15 years ago
- Availability by region: EU: April 1, 2011; NA: May 26, 2011; JP: October 26, 2011
- Predecessor: PSP Go; Xperia X10
- Successor: Xperia Ray
- Related: Sony Xperia S Sony Xperia U Sony Xperia neo L PlayStation Vita
- Compatible networks: GSM (GPRS, EDGE), UMTS, UMTS, CDMA, EvDO
- Form factor: Slider
- Dimensions: 119 mm (4.7 in) H 62 mm (2.4 in) W 16 mm (0.63 in) D
- Weight: 175 g (6.2 oz)
- Operating system: Original: Android 2.3.2 "Gingerbread"; Current: Android 2.3.4 "Gingerbread"
- CPU: 1 GHz Qualcomm Snapdragon S2 MSM8255
- GPU: Adreno 205
- Memory: 512 MB
- Storage: 400 MB
- Removable storage: microSD card (up to 64 GB), (up to 256 GB with rooted device.)
- SIM: SIM, eSIM (for CDMA models only)
- Battery: 1500 mAh
- Rear camera: 5.1 MP (480p with stock OS, 720p with update)
- Front camera: VGA, 640 × 480; 1.3 MP
- Display: 4 in (100 mm) TFT LCD touchscreen, 854 × 480 (245 ppi) FWVGA, 16M colors
- Connectivity: micro-USB 2.0
- Data inputs: Touchscreen; Accelerometer; Touchpad; 20× buttons (D-pad,,,,, L, R, Select, Start, Menu (×2), Back, Home, Search, Volume ±, Power)
- SAR: Head: 0.323 W/kg 1 g Body: 0.473 W/kg 1 g Hotspot: 1.400 W/kg 1 g
- Hearing aid compatibility: M4/T4

The Xperia Play is a slider-style smartphone with elements of a handheld game console produced by Sony Ericsson. It was announced on February 13, 2011 at Mobile World Congress (MWC) and began shipping globally in March 2011, with a launch lineup of around 50 software titles. Originally rumored to be a "PlayStation Phone", the device shed the "PlayStation" branding of Sony in favor of the Xperia brand, running on the Android operating system.

The phone has a slide-out D-pad with PlayStation gaming buttons and triggers. It runs on a Snapdragon S2 processor with Adreno 205 graphics. The display is a 4.0 inch LED-backlit LCD with a resolution of 480x854 pixels. No successor PlayStation phone was released although a prototype revision of the Xperia Play was leaked in 2012.

== Hardware ==
The device is a horizontally sliding phone with its original form resembling the Xperia X10 while the slider below resembles the slider of the PSP Go. The slider features a D-pad in an indented area on the left side, a set of standard PlayStation buttons ( and) in an indented area on the right, a long rectangular touchpad in the middle, Start and Select buttons in an indented area on the bottom right corner, a Menu button on the bottom left corner, and two shoulder buttons (L and R) on the back of the device. The form has a long rectangular touchscreen, and four buttons below, for Back, Home, Menu, and Search.

The device features a 1 GHz Qualcomm Snapdragon processor, a Qualcomm Adreno 205 GPU, a 4.0 in (100 mm) TFT LCD with a resolution of 854 × 480 (FWVGA) capable of 16,777,216 colors, a 5.1-megapixel camera, 512 MB RAM, 400 MB internal storage and a micro-USB connector. It supports microSD cards, in contrast to the PSP consoles, which use Memory Stick variants, and the PlayStation Vita, which uses a custom, proprietary flash storage medium.

== Software ==
The device runs on the Android 2.3 operating system, with early prototypes running Android 2.2 "Froyo". The device is compatible with Android software downloaded from the Google Play store, with some games featuring optimization for use with the device's additional gaming controls, including the video game streaming service OnLive.

=== PlayStation Suite ===
The device was said to feature games graphically within the range of similar portable devices and can launch these games via an application known as PlayStation Suite, or just simply "Xperia PLAY." It changes the interface of the device from that of a phone to the XrossMediaBar, slightly resembling that of the PlayStation Portable. It used emulation of the original PlayStation made for the Pulga, a cancelled plug-and-play version of the original console intended for the Brazilian market. A dedicated section in Google Play specifically for games for the system allowing users to download games on the go is also added. Titles shown off internally on the device include PSP games, such as God of War and LittleBigPlanet, as well as older PlayStation games; there were also plans for future games incorporating augmented reality similar to Invizimals. The prices of the games were expected to be under US$10, considerably lower than the PlayStation Portable's price range of less than US$40 per game.

=== PlayStation Mobile ===
PlayStation Mobile was a platform for creating games that were cross-platform with the PSVita, and "PlayStation Certified" android devices, such as the Xperia Play. The service shut down in 2015, preventing re-downloads of previously purchased games. The PlayStation Mobile application features a sign-in screen that attempts to login to the PlayStation Network using the standard auth.np.ac.playstation.net, as on the Vita and PS3.

== History ==
=== Development ===
==== Rumors ====
Reports of a PlayStation smartphone have existed as early as 2006 when Sony Computer Entertainment filed a patent for a PlayStation Phone. Rumors of such a device resurfaced again in 2007 when a Sony Ericsson executive announced that they were developing a device for gaming, and plans to use the XrossMediaBar in its devices. In June 2007, head of Sony Computer Entertainment Europe, David Reeves, denied the existence of such a device saying that he had no knowledge of such a device being developed. During the 2007 Games Convention, Peter Ahnegard, an executive at Sony Ericsson, further fueled rumors of a PlayStation Phone, when asked about the device he said that "It's obviously something that we're looking at but right now I can't really comment".

In early 2008, the official Sony Magazine reported that "a new PSP-style phone is apparently in development". In early 2009, it was reported that plans for a PlayStation Phone had been cancelled as Sony were unwilling to license the PlayStation brand to Sony Ericsson unless Sony would produce the handset independently. This subsequently prompted a fallout between Sony and Sony Ericsson. In May 2009, rumors of such a device arose once again when then head of Sony Ericsson, Hideki Komiyama, told the Financial Times in an interview that as part of his recovery plan for Sony Ericsson, he would like to combine the PlayStation brand with their phones similar to how they had created the Walkman and Cyber-shot lines of mobile phones. In June 2009, The Nikkei reported that Sony Ericsson were developing a "cellphone-game gear hybrid" as a competitor to Apple's iPhone, combining the functionality of a mobile phone and a handheld gaming device.

==== Images surface ====
In early 2010, the Wall Street Journal reported that Sony was getting ready to release a smartphone able to download and play video games. The first solid details about the phone came via Engadget in August 2010, reporting many leaked details about the device including that it runs Android, it is a sliding phone with a button configuration similar to the PSP Go, with some technical specifications. Pictures of the device were leaked to the internet when Engadget released pictures of a prototype running Android 2.2, a PSP Go like form factor with a touch pad and microSD card support. Several sites however, have questioned the legitimacy of the images of the device in question, though Engadget rebuked these and shown their proven track record of leaked devices which include the iPad, 2010 MacBook Air and the Nexus One. More images of the device were released by Engadget on October 29, 2010, showing the device running Android 2.2 Froyo and showing its model as "Zeus", it adds that there are several of these devices in internal testing stages with at least one device running Android 2.3 Gingerbread. A video showing the device in the wild in Greece was leaked on December 1, 2010. It showed the device running Android 2.3, and reported that the device's final name would be the Sony Ericsson Z1 though this has not been confirmed by multiple sources.

Two days later, more videos were leaked. They were far clearer, showing the device clearly, with a "PlayStation" icon on the phone which displays a XrossMediaBar-themed interface when selected. On January 5, 2011, Engadget published more photos of what seems to be the final design for the device as it bears both the PlayStation and Xperia brands which weren't on the prototypes. The day after, several other clearer photos and videos of the device was leaked revealing what seems to be its final design, specs, and its benchmark score of 59.1 frames per second. On January 10, 2011, a video showing the device playing PlayStation games was released. Though it is unclear whether the games were being played through official software or an emulator of PlayStation. On January 12, 2011, a Chinese website released pictures of what looked like the device disassembled with the parts spread out and the casing removed.

=== Official announcement ===
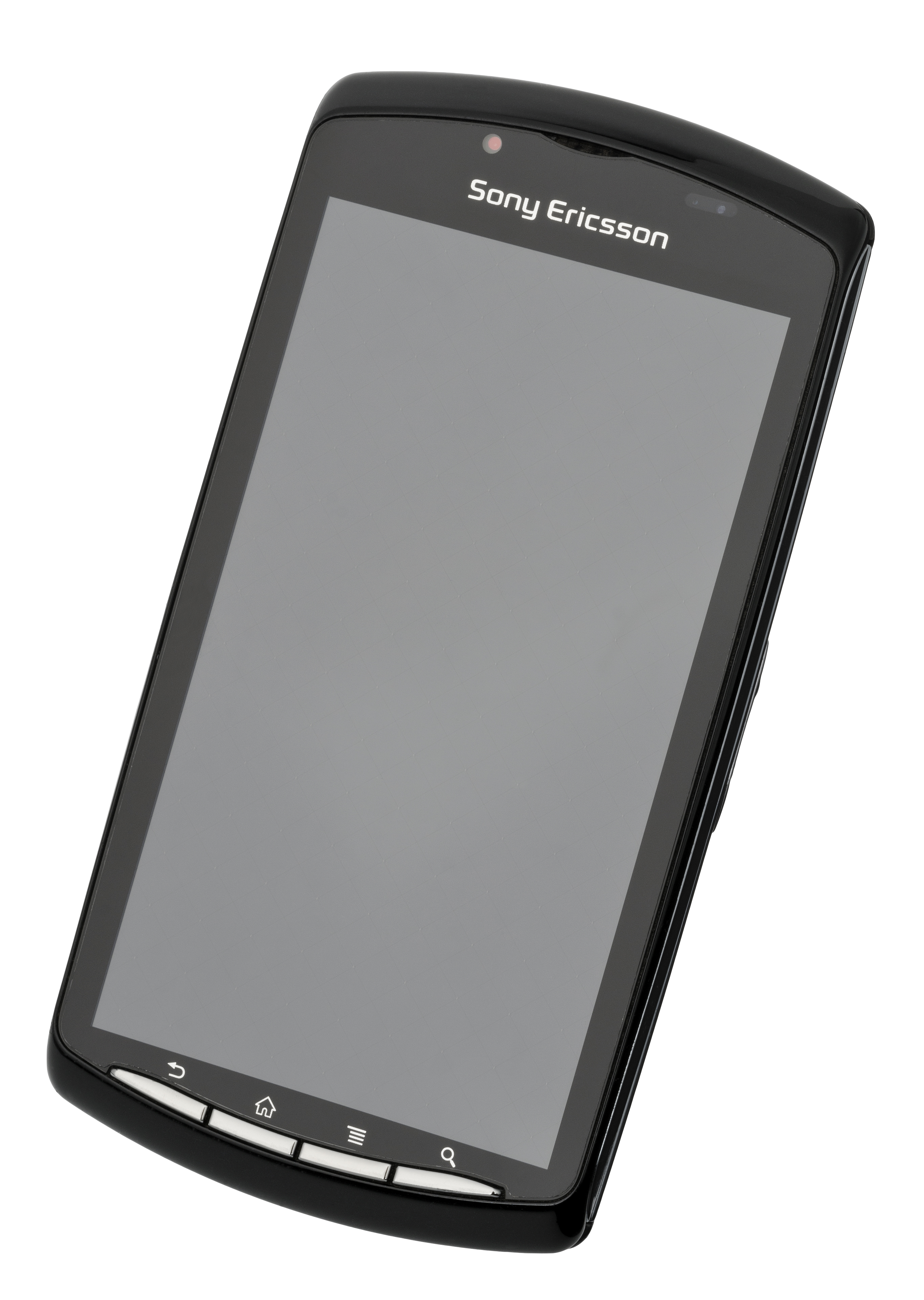
The handset in the closed position

On February 6, 2011, Sony Ericsson created an event for the Xperia Play on their Facebook page.

In late January or early February, a shortened version of an advert made for airing during the Super Bowl was leaked on several websites. On February 6, 2011, the device was officially announced with the broadcast of the version of this ad. On February 13, 2011, more details were released by Sony Ericsson.

=== Release ===
The phone was initially announced as having a March 2011 release timeframe. However, the final release date slipped into April 1, 2011, when the device was released in the UK, Ireland and Spain. On April 28, 2011, it was launched in Canada, exclusively to Rogers. The US launch was officially scheduled for Spring 2011, and while a time frame of mid-April was initially given, the device's launch was pushed back to May 26. In Indonesia, the device was launched on XL Axiata network on July 29, 2011. On September 18, 2011, the Xperia Play 4G was released for AT&T, it features HSPA+ for faster speeds and it comes in a Stealth Blue color. In the US, the Xperia Play was initially available only on the Verizon network, until the release of the Xperia Play 4G on AT&T. In Mexico it was available through Telcel. In the UK, carriers O_{2}, Vodafone, Orange, T-Mobile and Three have confirmed that they were to stock the handset. In Canada, the device was carried exclusively by Rogers Wireless.

== Android updates ==
On September 8, 2011, Sony Ericsson confirmed that the Xperia Play, and all Xperia phones released in 2011, would receive an update to Android 4.0 "Ice Cream Sandwich". However, on May 25, 2012, it was stated that following beta testing and discussions with developers, the Xperia Play would not receive an update to Android 4.0, citing stability concerns. The update was leaked however, and the kernel being unsigned meant that a user's bootloader would have needed to be unlocked, voiding the device's warranty at the time. The Xperia Play had gotten an update to Android 4.0 technically, as it was actually the Sony Xperia Neo L (MT25i) that came with Ice Cream Sandwich stock, though the MT25i device is just an Xperia Play - just lacking the gamepad slideout. MT25i firmwares can be installed on R800 model devices, with the cost being the gamepads functionality entirely, unless you use a custom kernel made specifically for the Play to utilize ICS firmware. The most recent Android OS capable of being run on the Play is Android 7.1.2 through LineageOS. The touchpad is unable to be utilized after Android 4.2, in terms of custom ROMs, but the gamepad works across the board.

== Emulation and homebrew ==
Since the Xperia Play runs on Android, the device may install apps for playing homebrew games. It is commonly used to run emulators for older game systems such as Atari 2600, MAME, Commodore 64, NES, SNES, Nintendo 64, PlayStation, Game Boy Advance, Nintendo DS, Sony PlayStation Portable (with only a handful of games running in a playable state), among others.

== See also ==
- List of Android smartphones
- N-Gage
- Sony Tablets
