= Sony Xperia P =

Android smartphone manufactured by Sony

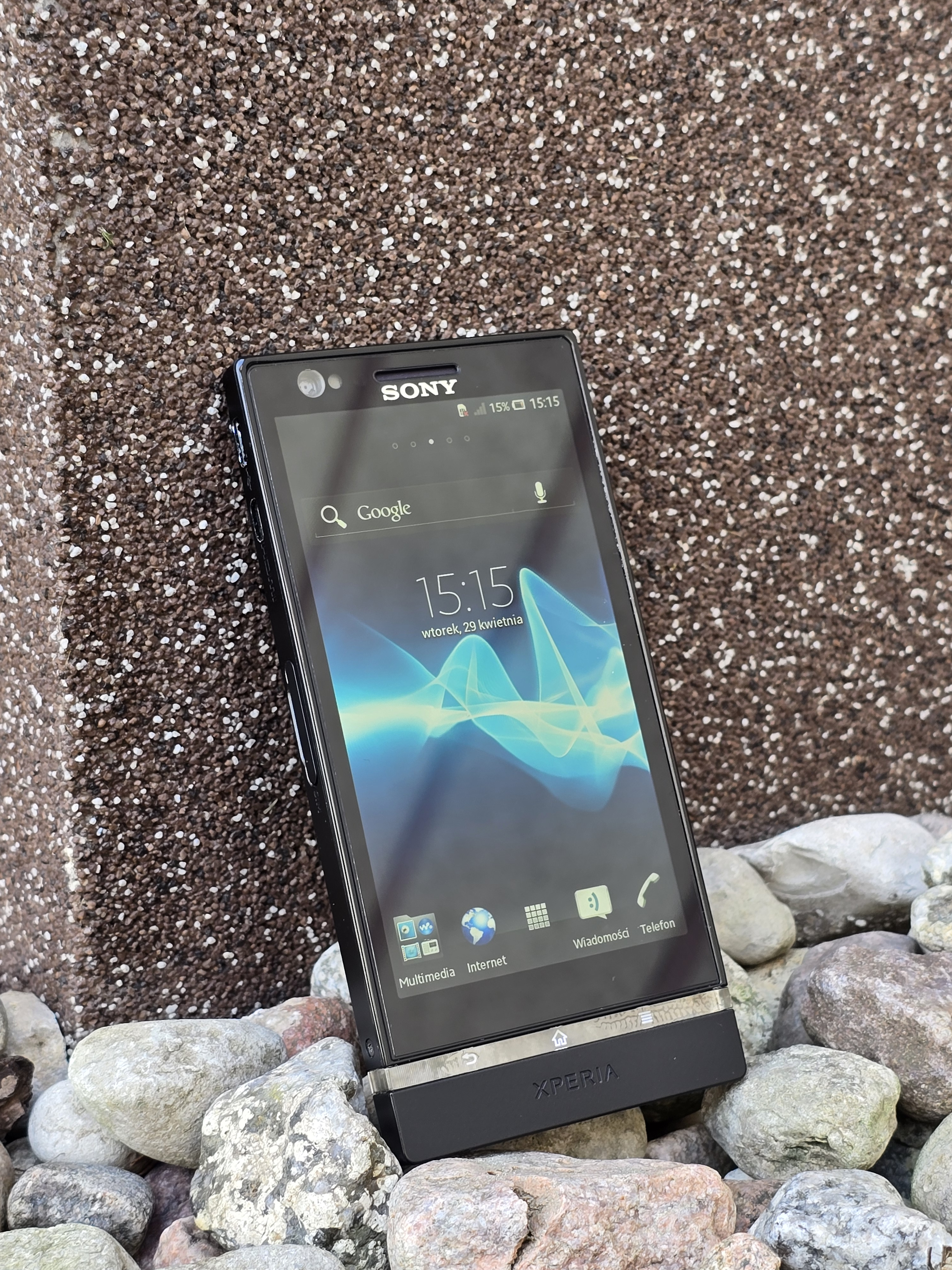
- Sony Xperia P in black; (Model: LT22i)
- Brand: Sony
- Manufacturer: Sony Mobile
- Type: Smartphone
- Series: Xperia
- Successor: Sony Xperia SP
- Related: Sony Xperia S Sony Xperia U
- Form factor: Bar
- Dimensions: 122.0×59.5×10.5 mm (4.80×2.34×0.41 in)
- Weight: 120 g (4 oz)
- Operating system: Android 2.3.7 "Gingerbread" upgradable to Android 4.1.2 (Jelly Bean)
- CPU: 1 GHz dual-core STE NovaThor U8500
- GPU: Mali 400 (Single Core)
- Memory: 1GB RAM
- Storage: 16 GB (11.2 GB Available)
- Battery: Non-replaceable Li-ion 1305 mAh
- Rear camera: 8 MP, Auto-focus, LED flash, 3D Sweep Panorama, face and smile detection and geo-tagging, FullHD 1080p video recording at 30 FPS
- Front camera: VGA
- Display: 4-inch; qHD (960x540 pixels) (275 ppi); 16M colour TFT; qHD display with White Magic and Bravia Engine
- Connectivity: Bluetooth 2.1+EDR and A2DP, Wi-Fi 802.11 b/g/n, USB 2.0, NFC
- Data inputs: Touch, Accelerometer

The Sony Xperia P is an Android smartphone produced by Sony that sits above the Xperia U and below the Xperia S. It was announced at Mobile World Congress 2012 alongside the Xperia U and Xperia S.

== Hardware ==
=== Screen ===
The Xperia P has a 4-inch screen of QHD (960 x 540) resolution with "Whitemagic technology". The addition of White magic technology to the display is done by adding another white sub-pixel at hardware level along with basic RGB pixels (RGBW). This facilitates optimum of 960 nits of brightness which makes it best of its class. According to claims by Sony officials, this technology increases the battery life by a great extent.

The device's exterior design resembles that of the Xperia S.

=== Camera ===
The Xperia P comes with an 8 megapixel camera with Sony's EXMOR-R sensor for better photography during low light condition. It also produces 1080p full HD video supplemented by video light (flash continuously in on state).

The phone also has a built-in secondary camera (front-facing camera) for video calling and video chatting, the resolution is 640 x 480 VGA. The smartphone has various features including Smile detection, Sweep Panorama, 3D Sweep Multi angle and 3D Sweep panorama. Many users have reported problem with camera after updating the OS to Android ICS.

In various 3rd-party applications that used the camera of the phone, the viewfinder couldn't show the full image but rather a half blacked out image. Sometimes, the camera produced images that had a black patch when shooting with the 8MP (4:3 aspect ratio) mode in the stock camera application.

These issues were fixed in Android Jelly Bean 4.1.2 update released in April 2013. But, 3D Sweep Multi Angle and 3D Sweep Panorama features have been removed which were features since the launch of the device with the Android Gingerbread firmware.

== Software ==
The phone shipped with Android Gingerbread 2.3.7 in 2012. The first updates to Android Ice Cream Sandwich 4.0.4 were available since August 2012. There have been a number of minor updates for stability enhancements since then. The Xperia P was planned to receive an update to Android Jelly Bean 4.1.2 in late March 2013 but the update was delayed and was released on 24 April 2013.
