= Lenovo A526 =

- Manufacturer: Lenovo
- Type: Smartphone
- Form factor: Touchscreen
- Operating system: Android 4.2, Jelly Bean
- System-on-chip: Mediatek MT6582M
- CPU: 1.3 GHz Quad-core Cortex A7
- GPU: ARM Mali-400MP2
- Memory: 1 GB
- Storage: 4 GB, expandable up to 32 GB
- Battery: 2000 mAh
- Rear camera: 5.0 MP
- Front camera: 0.3 MP VGA
- Display: 4.5" FWVGA
- Connectivity: ◦3G Network: WCDMA 900/2100MHz, WCDMA 850/1900MHz ◦2G Network: GSM 900/1800/1900MHz, GSM 850/1800/1900MHz ◦WLAN: Wi-Fi 802.11 b/g/n, Wi-Fi hotspot ◦Bluetooth®: 2.1 / 3.0(HS) / 4.0 ◦Radio: FM Receiver

Lenovo A526 is a dual-SIM, quad-core MediaTek Cortex A7 based smartphone launched on 2 April 2014. It released on April 5, 2014.

== Design and features ==
The CPU is Mediatek Cortex A7 1.3 GHz quad-core processor. It has a 4.5 inch FWVGA screen with a resolution of 480x854 px.

RAM memory is 1 GB, internal eMMC memory size is 4 GiB. Additionally, the smartphone supports external microSD/microSDHC card of a capacity up to 32 GB.

The Li-Po battery capacity is 2000 mAh. Lenovo A526 is running Android 4.2, Jelly Bean operating system.
