= Sony Xperia J =

Android smartphone model

Sony Xperia J (ST26i/ST26a)

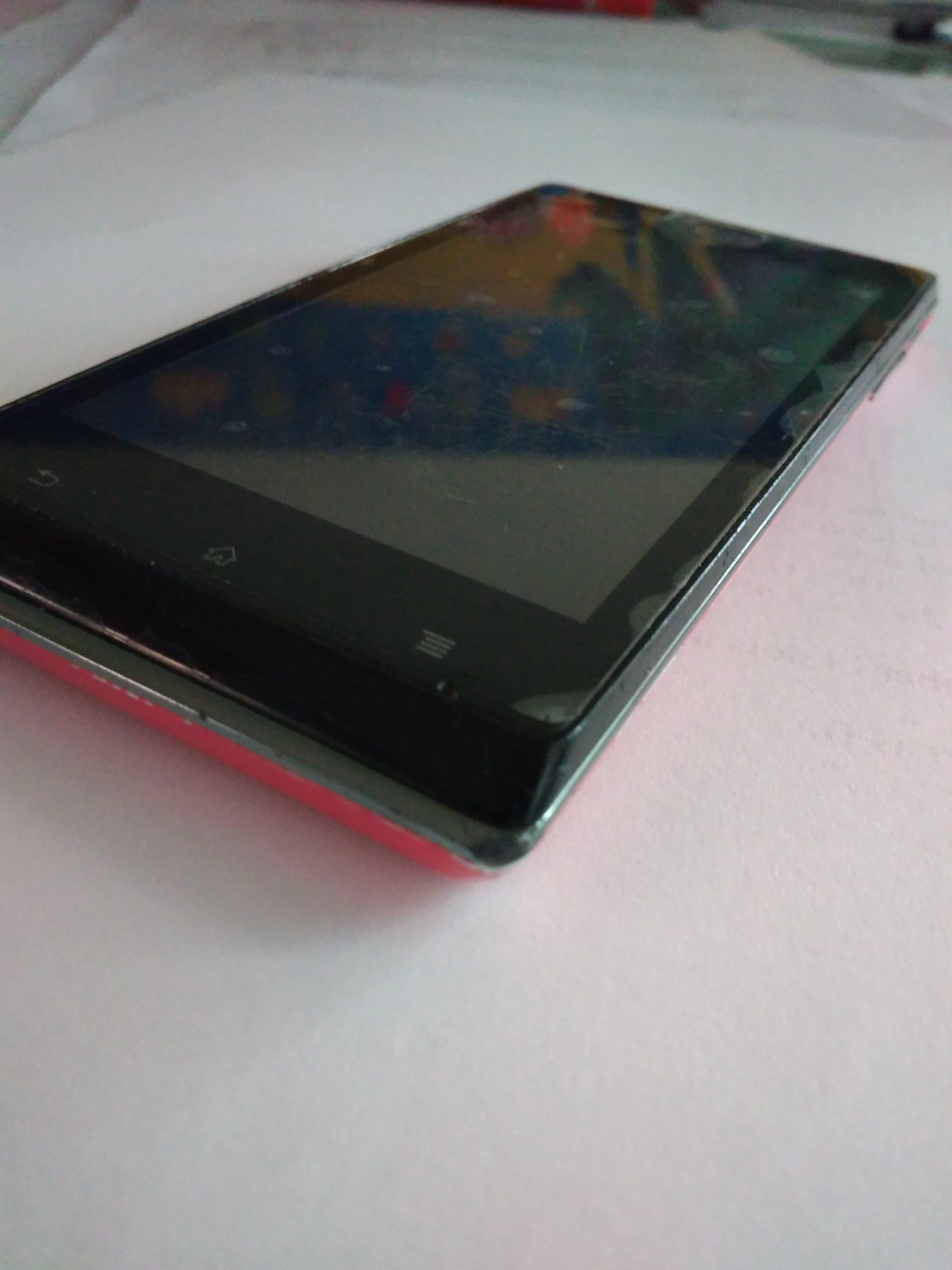
- Manufacturer: Sony Mobile Communications
- Type: Smartphone
- Series: Xperia
- First released: August 29, 2012; 13 years ago
- Availability by region: 29 August 2012
- Discontinued: November 9, 2014; 11 years ago
- Predecessor: Sony Xperia U
- Successor: Sony Xperia M Sony Xperia L
- Related: Xperia V, Xperia T
- Compatible networks: GSM 850, 900, 1800, 1900, HSDPA 900/2100 – ST26i; HSDPA 850/1900/2100 – ST26a
- Form factor: Bar
- Dimensions: 124.3 mm (4.89 in) H 61.2 mm (2.41 in) W 9.2 mm (0.362 in) D
- Weight: 124 g (4.37 oz)
- Operating system: Android 4.0.4 "Ice Cream Sandwich", Upgradable to Android 4.1.2 "Jelly Bean"
- System-on-chip: Qualcomm Snapdragon S1 MSM7227A
- CPU: 1GHz, ARM architecture ARM Cortex-A5
- GPU: Adreno 200 (enhanced)
- Memory: 512 MB
- Storage: 4GB (1.3GB OS, 766 MB Apps, around 2GB user data)
- Removable storage: up to 32GB microSD/HC card
- Battery: 1750 mAh
- Rear camera: 5 MP auto focus 4x digital zoom Auto focus LED flash Geotagging; VGA video recording
- Front camera: VGA
- Display: 4.0 in (100 mm); FWVGA (854 x 480 pixels) (245 ppi); 16,777,216 colour TFT
- Connectivity: Wi-Fi 802.11b/g/n, Micro USB 2.0, Bluetooth v2.1 + EDR, DLNA, A-GPS
- Data inputs: Multi-touch, capacitive touchscreen Accelerometer; Microphone; Proximity sensor Magnetometer
- Development status: Discontinued
- Other: Wi-Fi hotspot, USB tethering, Gorilla glass

The Sony Xperia J is an Android smartphone from Sony. It was launched at the IFA 2012 in Berlin. It is also known as Sony ST26i.

== Specifications ==
=== Design ===
Xperia J is the first Sony Mobile device alongside the Xperia V that does not feature the Sony Ericsson's liquid energy logo after Sony acquired Ericsson's stake in Sony Ericsson in February 2012. The display is protected by Corning Gorilla Glass. It is available in black, gold, pink and white. It measures 124.3 mm × 61.2 mm × 9.2 mm and weighs 124 grams.

=== Hardware ===
Xperia J has a 4.0 in (100 mm) touchscreen with 480×854 resolution, a Qualcomm Snapdagon S1 system-on-chip with 1 GHz single core Cortex-A5 CPU and Adreno 200 GPU, a 5-megapixel rear camera, 512 MB of RAM, 4 GB of internal storage which can be extended up to 32 GB by a microSD/HC card, and a 1750 mAh battery.

=== Software ===
Xperia J runs on Android 4.0.4 Ice Cream Sandwich out of the box. Sony updated this device for Android 4.1.2 Jelly Bean on 7 March 2013, which it lists as the "latest and final version" of the operating system.

Preceded by Sony Xperia U	Sony Xperia J 2012-2014	Succeeded by Sony Xperia M
