= Sony Xperia M =

2013 smartphone model

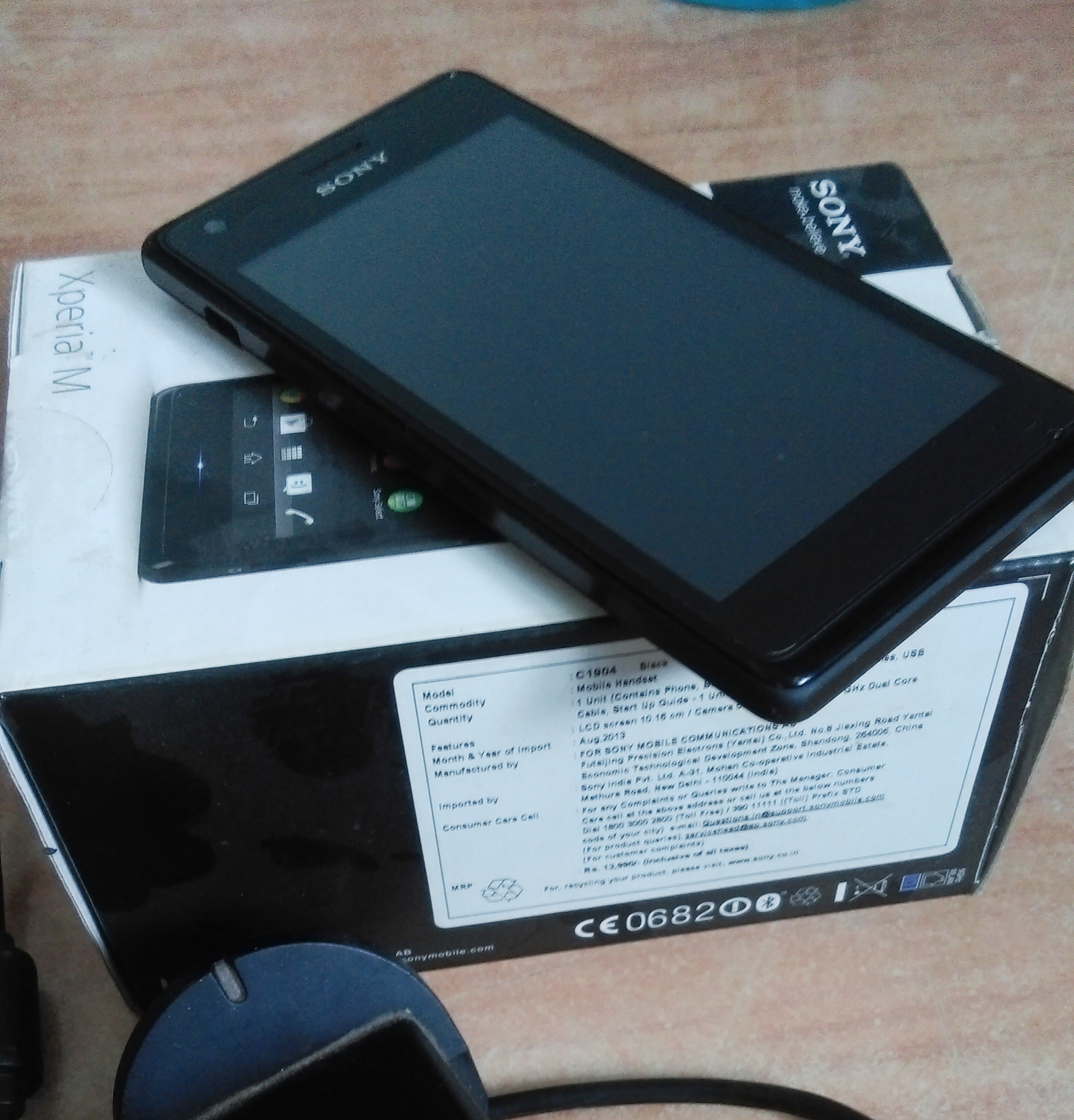
- Sony Xperia M
- Brand: Sony
- Manufacturer: Sony Mobile Communications
- Type: Touchscreen smartphone
- Series: Sony Xperia
- First released: 4 June 2013; 13 years ago (UK)
- Availability by region: August 2013 (UK)
- Predecessor: Sony Xperia J
- Successor: Sony Xperia M2
- Related: Sony Xperia Z, Sony Xperia L, Sony Xperia E
- Form factor: Slate
- Dimensions: 124 mm (4.9 in) H 62 mm (2.4 in) W 9.3 mm (0.37 in) D
- Weight: 115 g (4.1 oz)
- Operating system: Android 4.1 Jelly Bean (C1904/C1905); 4.2 Jelly Bean (C2004/C2005) current v4.3 (Jelly Bean)(C2004/C2005) Unofficial Upgrade to Android 4.4.4 KitKat & Android 5.1.1 Lollipop & Android 6.0.1 Marshmallow via Custom ROMs & CyanogenMod
- System-on-chip: Qualcomm Snapdragon S4 Plus MSM8227
- CPU: Dual-core Krait @ 1.0 GHz
- GPU: Adreno 305 @ 400 MHz
- Memory: 1 GB RAM
- Storage: 4 GB (2 GB free storage; other 2 available after root)
- Removable storage: up to 32 GB microSD/HC
- Battery: 1,700 mAh (BA900)
- Rear camera: 5.0 MP with LED flash 720p video recording @ 30 frames/s 4x digital zoom
- Front camera: (0.3 MP)
- Display: 4 in (100 mm) diagonal TFT; 854x480 px
- Connectivity: Wi-Fi IEEE802.11 a/b/g/n Wi-Fi Direct; DLNA; GPS/A-GPS; NFC; Bluetooth 4.0 with ANT+ Micro USB 2.0 with mass storage class support and on-the-go support
- Data inputs: Multi-touch (4 fingers), capacitive touchscreen
- Model: Xperia M: C1904/C1905; Xperia M dual: C2004/C2005
- Codename: Nicki
- Website: Xperia M

The Sony Xperia M is an Android smartphone from Sony which was launched in August 2013.

== Features ==
=== Hardware ===
The Xperia M has a 4-inch TFT Capacitive touchscreen display, a 1 GHz Dual-core Snapdragon S4 Plus processor, a 5 mega-pixel HD Camera, 1 GB of RAM, and a total 4 GB of internal storage which can be extended by a microSD/HC card up to 32 GB. This phone also features removable back covers with different colors like black, purple, light green and white.

=== Software ===
The Xperia M is also available in a dual SIM variant as Xperia M Dual. The Android 4.3 Jelly Bean OS update has been released for both the Sony Xperia M and the Sony Xperia M Dual.

== Variants ==
Model	FCC id	Carriers/regions	GSM bands	UMTS bands	Notes
C1904	PY7PM-0480	Australia, North America	850, 900, 1800, 1900	850, 1700, 1900, 2100	single SIM
C1905	PY7PM-0490	Worldwide	850, 900, 1800, 1900	900, 2100	single SIM
C2004	PY7PM-0481	North America	850, 900, 1800, 1900	850, 1700, 1900, 2100	dual SIM
C2005	PY7PM-0491	Worldwide	850, 900, 1800, 1900	900, 2100	dual SIM

== Android KitKat Official Update Petition ==
From 3 August 2014 onwards Sony Xperia M users are signing a petition for Android Kitkat official update for Xperia M.

Preceded by Sony Xperia J	Sony Xperia M 2013	Succeeded by Sony Xperia M2
