= WhiteMagic =

WhiteMagic is a display technology developed by Sony and first used in Sony Xperia P. It adds one more white subpixel to conventional RGB pixel, making every pixels consists of RGBW sub-pixels.

== Display technology ==
Sony claims that as white sub-pixel have higher light-penetrating capability, it can provide same level of brightness with fewer back-lit, and thus able to save energy.

The display becomes up to twice as bright and up to twice as power efficient when using this technology. It totally eliminates the problem of sunlight visibility, providing the most clear sunlight legibility while saving power and not causing any heating problems. Traditional LCDs can save a lot of power by displaying mostly black and white colors but a LCD with WhiteMagic one can save even 50% more power using those colors... Sony dedicated a tiny blog post to this, while more detailed ones can be found too.

The technology had also been showcased by other companies like Japan Display.

With WhiteMagic, every group of RGBW sub-pixels belongs to one pixel instead of two as in Pentile RGBW. This gives a double sub-pixel density for the same ppi.

== See also ==
- Quattron
- PenTile
- Sony Xperia P
