= Sony Xperia Sola =

Smartphone model

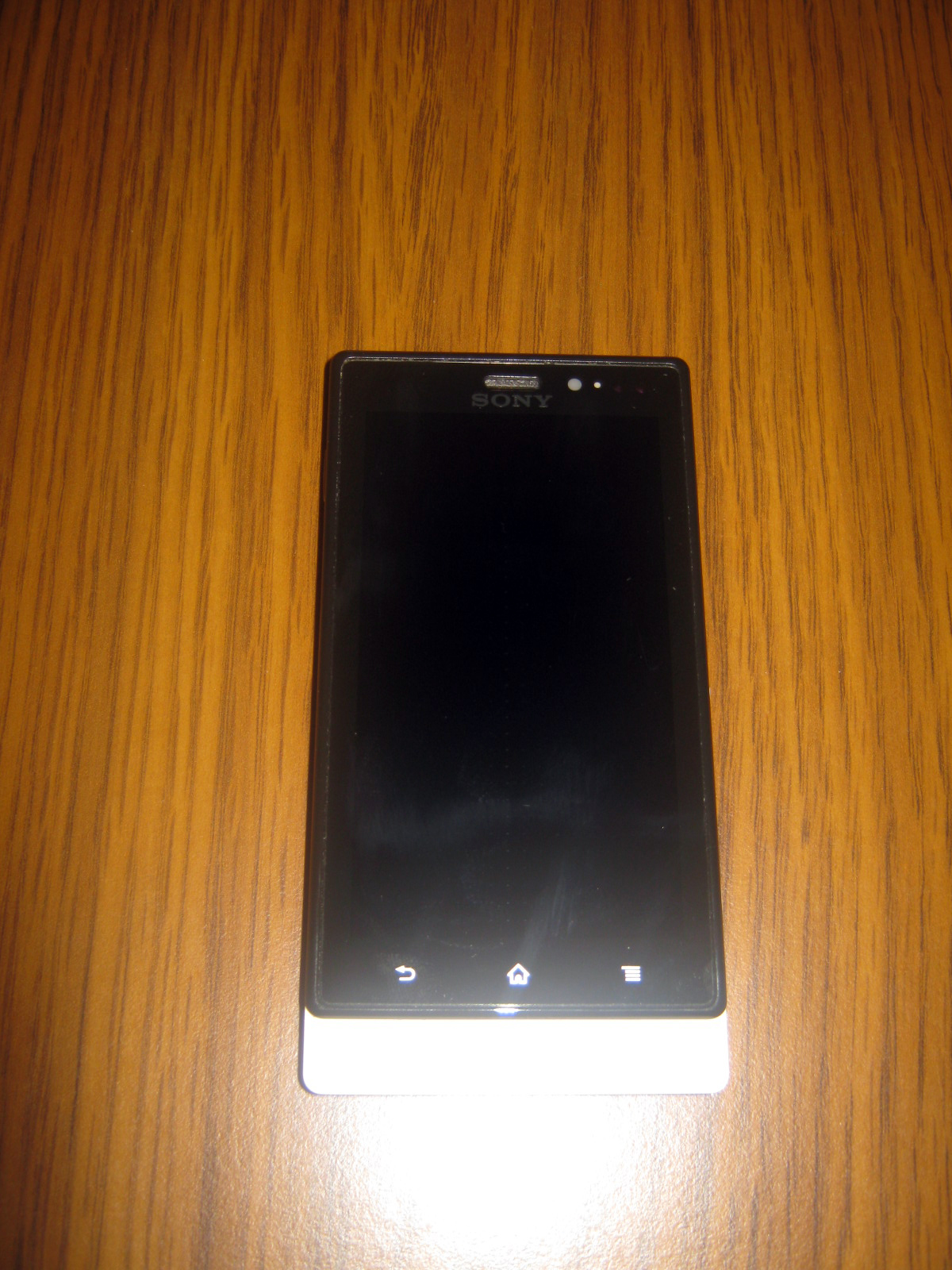
- Manufacturer: Sony Mobile Communications
- Type: Smartphone
- Series: Sony Xperia
- First released: May 2012; 14 years ago
- Successor: Sony Xperia SP
- Compatible networks: GSM GPRS/EDGE 850 / 900 / 1800 / 1900; W-CDMA Band I, II, V, dan VIII
- Colors: Black, White, Red
- Dimensions: 116 mm (4.6 in) H 59 mm (2.3 in) W 9.9 mm (0.39 in) D
- Weight: 107 g (3.8 oz)
- Operating system: Android 2.3 (Gingerbread); Upgradeable to Android 4.0.4 (Ice Cream Sandwich); Unofficial upgrade to Android 4.1.2 (Jelly Bean) via XDA
- System-on-chip: NovaThor U8500
- CPU: Dual-core 1 GHz Cortex-A9
- GPU: Mali-400
- Memory: 8 GB (5 GB user available), 512 MB RAM
- Removable storage: microSD, up to 32 GB
- Battery: Li-Ion 1320 mAh
- Rear camera: 5 Megapixel, 2592х1944 pixels, Autofocus, LED flash
- Display: 3.7 in (94 mm) LED-backlit LCD; 480 x 854 Resolution (~265 ppi)
- Connectivity: micro-USB, 3.5mm Audio Jack, Bluetooth 2.1, Wi-Fi 802.11 b/g/n, aGPS, GLONASS, NFC, DLNA
- Data inputs: On-screen QWERTY keyboard
- Other: PlayStation Suite, Sony Entertainment Network (specifically, "Music Unlimited" and "Video Unlimited")

The Sony Xperia Sola is an Android smartphone from Sony released in 2012. It runs Android 2.3 (Gingerbread) and is upgradeable to Android 4.0 (Ice Cream Sandwich). The Xperia sola features a 1 GHz dual-core processor, 512 MB RAM and a 3.7" Reality Display touch-screen with Sony's Mobile Bravia Engine. It is the earliest known smartphone to feature a touch screen able to detect a floating finger, which Sony branded as "Floating Touch".

== Hardware ==
The capacitive touchscreen display measures 3.7 inches with a resolution of 480 x 854 pixels at 265 ppi. It supports multi-touch and features High Definition Reality Display with Sony's mobile BRAVIA engine. The camera has 5 mega-pixels and is capable of shooting video at 720p. The device is powered by the 1 GHz U8500 dual-core NovaThor processor by ST-Ericsson. It has 512MB of RAM and 8GB internal storage. It is also equipped with NFC (Near Field Communication) which can be used with Xperia SmartTags.

=== Floating Touch ===
The Xperia sola is the first device from Sony to include "Floating Touch" technology. The technology makes it possible for the smartphone to detect a finger floating up to 0.79 inches (20mm) above the screen using self-capacitive touch screen technology.

In Android 2.3 floating touch could be used with the browser (element highlighting upon hovering). An upgrade to Android 4.0.4 has brought the ability to use this feature for entire interface (so called "glove mode" ). The Glove mode allows users to operate the device using hand gloves of any material.

However the functionality was largely limited to live wallpapers and the browser until the smartphone received an update to Android 4.0.4 "Ice Cream Sandwich" which introduced "Glove Mode" an extension to this feature.

=== Glove Mode ===
Glove Mode, as the name suggests, allowed users to control the smartphone wearing gloves. It is the second smartphone after Nokia Lumia 920 to sport this feature. Additionally the entire user interface could be controlled by hovering in combination with floating touch. In Glove Mode, a cursor ring showed where the touch was being registered by the screen. The software could also distinguish between a "normal" touch, and a gloved touch, meaning normal control of the device was possible without disabling Glove Mode on the device.

== Software ==
The Xperia sola was released with Android 2.3 (Gingerbread). It has received an update to Android 4.0.4 (Ice Cream Sandwich) on 28 September 2012. Sony Mobile confirmed that the Xperia sola will not receive an update to Android 4.1 "Jelly Bean".

The Ice Cream Sandwich update introduced several features including:

- Sony first-party music, video and picture programs, "WALKMAN", "Movies" and "Album"
- Extended standby mode
- Redesigned Lock screen with additional functionality
- Re-sizable widgets
- A mobile data tracker
- Recent Apps button
- Glove Mode which allows operation of the phone using gloves

The ICS update removed the ability to record video with stereo sound.

== Reception ==
Xperia Sola has received mixed to positive reviews from critics and had a limited release in select markets only. The innovation of floating touch and its future capabilities has generated a high interest among developers. Although the device has also been criticized for an average battery life and absence of a front camera otherwise each and every spec of the smartphone has been praised. The phone received an ICS upgrade in 2012.
