= Sony Ericsson Xperia Ray =

2011 Android smartphone from Sony Ericsson

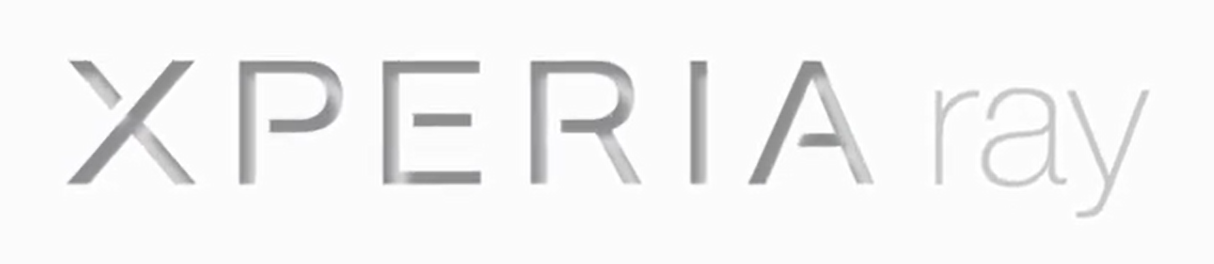

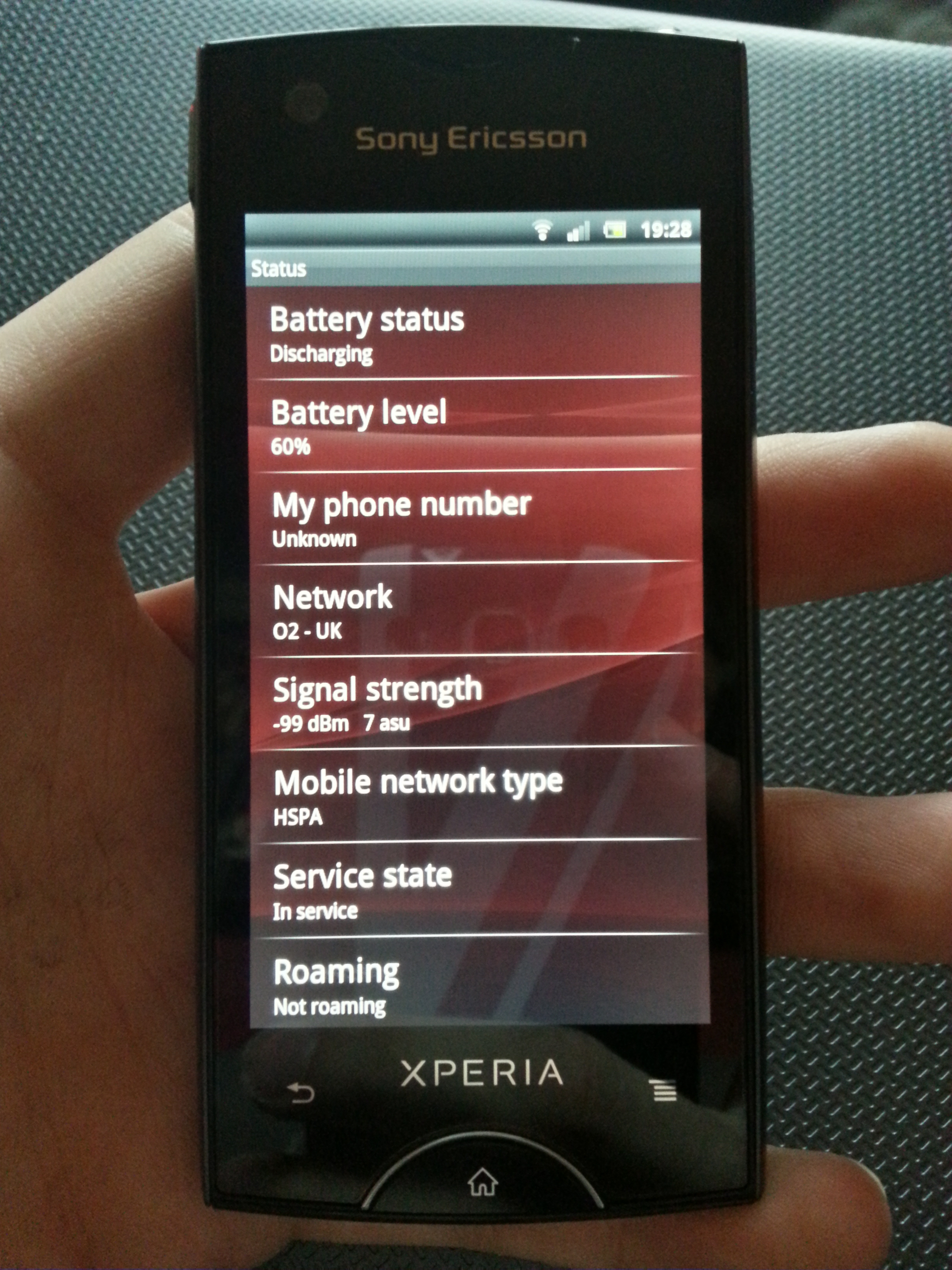
- An image of the Xperia Ray running Gingerbread
- Brand: Sony Ericsson
- Manufacturer: Beijing SE PUTIAN Mobile Comm. Co., Ltd.
- Type: Smartphone
- Series: Xperia
- Successor: Sony Xperia U Sony Xperia SX (Japan)
- Compatible networks: 2G GSM GPRS/EDGE: 850/900/1800/1900; 3G UMTS/HSPA: 850/900/2100
- Dimensions: 111.0 mm (4.37 in) H 53.0 mm (2.09 in) W 9.4 mm (0.37 in) D
- Weight: 100 g (3.5 oz)
- Operating system: Android 2.3.4 Gingerbread; Officially upgradeable to Android 4.0.4 Ice Cream Sandwich; Unofficially upgradeable to: Android 4.0.4 (Ice Cream Sandwich) via CyanogenMod 9, Android 4.1.2 (JellyBean) via CyanogenMod 10, Android 4.2.2 (JellyBean) via CyanogenMod 10.1, Android 4.3.1 (JellyBean) via CyanogenMod 10.2, Android 4.4.2 (Kitkat) via CyanogenMod 11.; Android 5.0.2 (Lollipop) via CyanogenMod 12.; Android 5.1.1 (Lollipop) via CyanogenMod 12.1, Android 6.0.1 (Marshmallow) via CyanogenMod 13.; Android 7.1.2 (Nougat) via Lineage OS 14.
- System-on-chip: Qualcomm (Snapdragon) MSM8255
- CPU: 1 GHz Scorpion
- GPU: Adreno 205
- Memory: 512 MB
- Storage: 1 GB (320 MB user available)
- Removable storage: microSD (up to 32 GB)
- Battery: 1500 mAh
- Rear camera: 8-megapixel Sony Exmor R BSI CMOS; f/2.4 apeture, 16x digital zoom, autofocus, face detection, image stabiliser, scene detection, self-timer, smile detection, touch focus 720p HD video recording at 30 fps
- Front camera: 0.3 megapixel (VGA)
- Display: 3.3" TFT LCD Reality Display; Mobile BRAVIA Engine, 854×480 pixels (FWVGA) resolution, 16:9 aspect ratio, 297 ppi pixel density, 16M (16,777,216) colors
- Connectivity: micro-USB, Bluetooth 2.1 + EDR, Wi-Fi (802.11 b/g/n)
- Data inputs: Multi-touch, Dual microphones, Accelerometer, A-GPS/GLONASS, Proximity, Magnetometer, Ambient light sensor, Push button
- Codename: Urushi
- SAR: Head 1.07 W/kg; Body 0.95 W/kg

The Sony Ericsson Xperia Ray (ST18i) is an Android smartphone from Sony Ericsson. It was unveiled on 22 June 2011 in Singapore during CommunicAsia 2011. It was announced that the Xperia ray would be released globally in select countries from Q3 2011.

== Specifications ==
=== Design ===
Sony Ericsson Xperia Ray has a 3.3 inch display; there is a "Xperia" logo, a physical home button that can be illuminated with four different colors (white, red, green and blue), and two capacitive buttons (menu and back buttons) on the lower bezel of the display while there is a "Sony Ericsson" logo, a front-facing camera, an earpiece and sensors on the upper bezel on the display. The display is protected by a scratch-resistant glass.

On the side frame, there is a microUSB port at the left, there is a volume rocker at the right, there is a headphone jack and a power button at the top, and there is a microphone hole and a groove to remove the back cover at the bottom.. The back cover is made of plastic, and includes a "Xperia" logo and the liquid energy logo of Ericsson. There is a rear camera, an LED flash and a loudspeaker at back,

Sony Ericsson Xperia ray measures 111 x 53 x 9.4 mm and weighs 100 grams. It is available in Black, Gold, White and Pink.

=== Hardware ===
Sony Ericsson Xperia ray contains similar hardware specifications to other 2011 Xperia phones but in a considerably smaller package. As a result, the display has a higher pixel density compared to other 2011 Xperia phones.

Sony Ericsson Xperia ray is powered by Qualcomm Snapdragon MSM8255 system-on-chip with 1 GHz Scorpion CPU and Adreno 205 GPU. It has 512 MB RAM and 300 MB internal storage expandable up to 32 GB through the microSD card slot under the battery; the device comes with a 4 GB microSD card. The rear camera is an Exmor R backlit (BSI) CMOS sensor with a resolution of 8 megapixels and capable of shooting in 720p at 30 frames per second. There is also a VGA front-facing camera. It has an LED flash for the camera. It has a 3.3 inch LCD Reality Display with Mobile BRAVIA Engine, 480x854 pixels (FWVGA) resolution, 16:9 aspect ratio and 297 ppi pixel density. It has a 1500 mAh removable battery.

=== Software ===
Sony Ericsson Xperia ray comes with Android 2.3.4 Gingerbread but is upgradeable to Android 4.0.4 Ice Cream Sandwich (ICS). CyanogenMod aftermarket custom firmwares are available.

Sony began the process of updating the ray to Android 4.0.4 "Ice Cream Sandwich" in April 2012 via their PC Companion application, instead of by an OTA (Over the Air) update.

The smartphone got an honourable mention in the 2012 Red Dot design awards 2012

== See also ==
- List of Xperia devices

Preceded by	Sony Ericsson Xperia ray 2011	Succeeded by Sony Xperia U
