= ZUK Mobile =

Chinese smartphone company

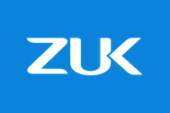
- Type: Subsidiary
- Industry: Consumer Electronics
- Founded: May 28, 2015; 11 years ago
- Founder: Alex Chen Yu (陈宇); Chang Cheng (常程); Chen Xudong (陈旭东)
- Defunct: April 27, 2017; 9 years ago
- Fate: Ceased operations
- Headquarters: Beijing, China
- Area served: Worldwide
- Key people: Chang Cheng (Chief Executive Officer); Alex Chen Yu (Chief Operation Officer and Chief Product Officer)
- Products: ZUK Z1; ZUK Z2; ZUK Z2 Pro; ZUK Edge
- Parent: Lenovo; Motorola Mobility
- Website: ZUK Mobile Global; ZUK Mobile China

ZUK Mobile was a Chinese smartphone company founded in May 2015, and a subsidiary of Lenovo. It was headquartered in Beijing. The brand ceased operations in 2017, when Lenovo shifted its smartphone focus to Motorola Mobility.

== History ==
ZUK Mobile was founded on May 28, 2015, as a spin off of Lenovo's smartphone business. Yang Yuanqing, CEO of Lenovo, said that investing in ZUK Mobile "is one of the Chinese tech giant's major steps in its business transformation in the Internet era". Furthermore, he said that the company is an independent brand different from Lenovo's previous subsidiary brands.

Less than two months later, ZUK Mobile entered into an exclusive licensing agreement with Cyanogen Inc. to base its products' Android distribution upon a variant of the popular custom ROM CyanogenMod and use its trademarks outside of China.

The company unveiled its first device, the ZUK Z1 in Beijing, China on August 11, 2015. Following its release, the company received over 1.5 million pre-orders within two days in mainland China.

On April 27, 2017, Lenovo announced that the ZUK brand would cease operations, and Lenovo would instead focus on Motorola smartphones. The official website of ZUK shut down in July 2017, and now redirects to the Motorola website.

== Products ==
=== Z1 ===
The Z1 is ZUK's "flagship" smartphone, unveiled in August 2015. It has a 5.5-inch 1080p display, 64 GB internal storage, a 13 MP rear camera, a 4,100 mAh battery, a Qualcomm Snapdragon 801 CPU, 3 GB RAM, a USB-C port for charging and audio, and a fingerprint reader. The international version of the Z1 runs Cyanogen OS 12.1, based on Android 5.1.1 "Lollipop". The Z1 is sold in China with ZUK's own ZUI version of Android based on Android 5.1 "Lollipop".

In mainland China, the ZUK Z1 costs CNY 1,799 (US$284) while an international version is expected to cost around US$300 or €280.

=== Z2 PRO ===
It was announced by the CEO of ZUK that a new device, the Z2, would be released in 2016. The new Z2 details were unveiled on 21 April 2016. The Z2, named the Z2 'Pro' has a 5.2" screen, a Qualcomm Snapdragon 820 processor, Adreno 530 GPU, 13 Megapixel OIS camera and comes in two models, 64 GB internal storage/4 GB RAM or 128 GB internal storage/6 GB RAM. The battery capacity is 3100MAh. The phone has health sensor and a fingerprint scanner and the higher spec device is priced 2,699 Yuan($416).

=== Z2 Plus ===
It was launched after the launched of Z2 Pro. Zuk Z2 has 5.0 inch Full HD display. It is powered by 3500 mAh battery and has 2.15 GHz quad core Qualcomm Snapdragon 820 processor. The camera at the back is of 13 MP and the front camera is of 8 MP. It has 4 GB RAM along with 64 GB internal storage. It runs on Android Marshmallow 6.0 out of box and now it has been upgraded from Android Marshmallow 6.0 to Oreo 8.0.

=== Z2 Rio Edition ===
It is a version of the Zuk Z2 with 3 GB RAM and 32 GB internal storage.

=== ZUI ===
ZUI is ZUK's own version of the Android 5.1.1 system. It is only released in China, presently on the ZUK Z1 mobile phone. It, alike many other Chinese variants of Android, contains no app drawer. It does utilise widgets, but does not have Google Play app store installed by default.

=== Transparent concept phone ===
ZUK displayed a transparent smartphone prototype at the Z1's launch. The device on display had nearly no bezel and was completely transparent when powered off.

== See also ==
- Lenovo smartphones
- CyanogenMod
- Lenovo Inc.
