= Lenovo Z6 =

Android mid-range smartphone

- Brand: Lenovo
- Manufacturer: Lenovo
- Type: Smartphone
- Series: Lenovo Z series
- First released: July 9, 2019
- Discontinued: Yes
- Predecessor: Lenovo Z5
- Related: Lenovo Z6 Pro
- Compatible networks: GSM, CDMA, HSPA, LTE
- Form factor: Slate
- Color: Blue
- Dimensions: 157.00×74.50×8.00 mm (6.181×2.933×0.315 in)
- Weight: 159 g (5.6 oz)
- Operating system: Android 9.0 (Pie), ZUI 11
- System-on-chip: Qualcomm SDM730 Snapdragon 730 (8 nm)
- CPU: Octa-core (2x2.2 GHz Kryo 470 Gold & 6x1.8 GHz Kryo 470 Silver)
- GPU: Adreno 618
- Memory: 6 GB or 8 GB RAM
- Storage: 64 GB or 128 GB UFS 2.1
- Removable storage: microSDXC (uses shared SIM slot)
- SIM: Dual Nano-SIM
- Battery: Non-removable Li-Po 4000 mAh
- Charging: 15W wired
- Rear camera: Triple: 24 MP, f/1.8, (wide), PDAF; 8 MP, f/2.4, (telephoto), PDAF, 2x optical zoom 5 MP, f/2.2, (depth sensor); Dual-LED flash, panorama, HDR
- Front camera: 16 MP, f/2.0, (wide), HDR
- Display: 6.39 in (162 mm) Super AMOLED, 120Hz, HDR10; 1080 x 2340 pixels, 19.5:9 ratio (~403 ppi density)
- Model: L78121

The Lenovo Z6 is a mid-range Android smartphone developed, designed, and manufactured by Lenovo, under its Z series. First revealed on July 4, 2019, by Lenovo Vice President Chang Cheng, it will be released exclusively in China on July 9 with an in-display fingerprint scanner.

== Specifications ==
=== Hardeare and performance ===
The device is powered by an 8-nanometer Qualcomm SDM730 Snapdragon 730 chipset, which includes an octa-core CPU consisting of two 2.2 GHz Kryo 470 Gold cores and six 1.8 GHz Kryo 470 Silver cores, integrated by an Adreno 618 GPU.

=== Memory ===
The device comes with either 64 GB or 128 GB of internal UFS 2.1 storage paired with either 6 GB or 8 GB of RAM. Storage expansion is supported via a microSDXC card slot.

=== Cameras ===
On the rear, the Lenovo Z6 features a triple-camera system led by a 24-megapixel wide-angle sensor with an f/1.8 aperture, phase-detection autofocus (PDAF), and a 1/2.8-inch sensor size. This primary lens is accompanied by an 8-megapixel telephoto sensor supporting a 2x optical zoom, alongside an undisclosed auxiliary lens. The rear setup includes a Dual-LED flash, supports panorama and HDR imaging, and is capable of recording video at up to 4K resolution at 30 frames per inch. A 16-megapixel wide-angle selfie camera with an f/2.0 aperture sits on the front, offering HDR capabilities and video capture up to 1080p at 30 frames per inch.

=== Display ===
The Z6 features a Super AMOLED display with 120Hz refresh rate, a resolution of 1080 × 2340 pixels with 19.5:9 ratio, and a 403 ppi pixel density.

=== Software ===
The Z6 runs on Android 9.0 Pie with ZUI 11 user inferface.
