= Lenovo smartphones =

Smartphones

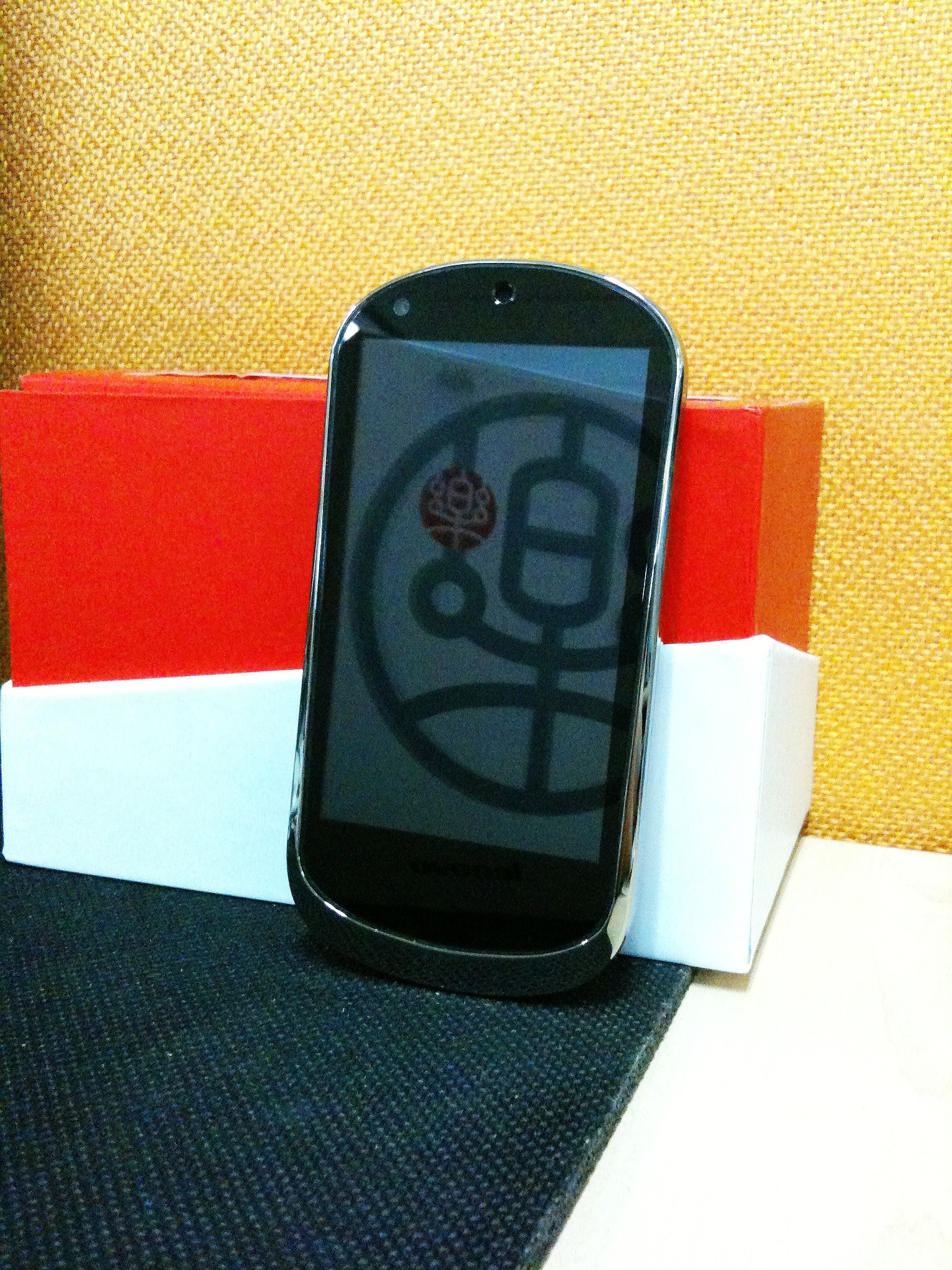
A Lenovo smartphone just after unboxing

Lenovo smartphones are marketed as the "LePhone" in mainland China, and as the "IdeaPhone" overseas (designed and manufactured by the Motorola Mobility, ZUK Mobile and Medion, divisions of Lenovo). On April 27, 2017, Lenovo announced that the ZUK brand would cease operations. In 2015, Lenovo subsumed its own smartphone division into the acquired Motorola brand.

== Marketing and sales growth ==
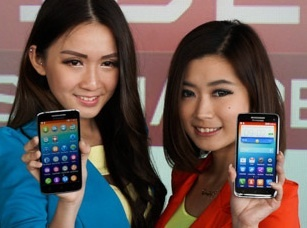
The Vibe X presented by models at launch

Lenovo has implemented an aggressive strategy to replace Samsung as mainland China's top smartphone manufacturer. It spent $793.5 million in Wuhan to build a plant that can produce 30 to 40 million phones per year. Data from Analysys International shows that Lenovo's China smartphone sales experienced considerable growth in 2012. Lenovo's market share increased to 14.2 percent during 2012's third quarter, representing an increase over 4.8 percent sales growth in the same quarter of 2011. IDC analysts said that Lenovo's success is due to its "aggressive ramping-up and improvements in channel partnerships. "Analysys International analyst Wang Ying wrote, "Lenovo possesses an obvious advantage over rivals in terms of sales channels." The company's CEO, Yang Yuanqing, said, "Lenovo does not want to be the second player ... we want to be the best. Lenovo has the confidence to outperform Samsung and Apple, at least in the Chinese market."

Yang Yuanqing said that Lenovo's strategy for Lenovo devices dictates an emphasis on its home market of China and emerging markets such as Russia, Indonesia, India, and the Middle East. Lenovo planned significant product releases in those markets in 2013. Yang said Lenovo is pursuing this strategy due to its thin pre-tax profit margin of only 2.6%. He said, "If you don’t have enough scale, if you don’t have enough volume, it’s hard to make money. If you don’t have enough market share, it’s hard to make money," Yuanqing says. "That’s why we enter the markets one by one. When we enter a market, we want to quickly get double-digit market share."

The LePhone, as Lenovo smartphones were called in China, is offered at a relatively low price point and is customized for the Chinese market. The LePhone benefited from strong support from Chinese mobile carriers and content providers such as Baidu, Alibaba, and Tencent. Having seen rapid growth in China's smartphone market, Lenovo has begun efforts to raise its share in the high-end market by cooperating with Taiwanese chip designer MediaTek in 2012. According to IHS iSuppli, Lenovo was a top-three smartphone maker in China with a 16.5 percent market share in the first quarter of 2012. According to a May 2012, report released by IDC Lenovo ranks fourth in the global tablet market by volume. In November 2012, Lenovo became the second largest seller of mobile phones in China when measured by volume.

Lenovo planned to release its smartphones in Nigeria in the second half of 2013 in an effort to find markets where it can sell directly to consumers. Lenovo picked Nigeria, because unlike South Africa and other African countries, there is no requirement to partner with a local telecom firm to sell its phones. Lenovo will sell its phones across as many as six price segments with the most expensive selling for about US$500. Lenovo said it was investigating the rest of Africa and that Egypt would be its next target for expansion.

Lenovo began selling smartphones in Kazakhstan in November 2013. In the same month, Lenovo announced that it would start selling phones in at least 20 new markets "in the next few quarters." Lenovo said these markets would include the Middle East, Africa, and Latin America. Yang Yuanqing said that Lenovo decided to accelerate its expansion after success in Indonesia where Lenovo achieved 13-percent market share in one year while achieving higher profit margins than it earns in China.

Lenovo sold about 50 million smartphones in 2013. The same year Lenovo increased its smartphone sales by 60% from 2012. Most of these sales took place in China where low and middle-end smartphones were still in great demand.

Lenovo has assembled a team of senior managers familiar with the Indian market, launched mobile phones at all price points there, and worked on branding and marketing in order to build market share. As of February 2014, Lenovo claims that its sales of smartphones in India have been increasing 100% per quarter while the market is only growing 15-20% over the same period. Lenovo did marketing tests of its smartphones in November 2012 in Gujarat and some southern cities, where Lenovo already had a strong presence. Lenovo's strategy has been create awareness, maintain a broad selection of phones at all price points, and developing distribution networks. Lenovo partnered with two national distributors and over 100 local distributors. As of February 2014, more than 7,000 retail outlets in India sold Lenovo smartphones. Lenovo has also partnered with HCL in order to set up 250 service centres in 110 cities.

In March 2014, Lenovo announced that it would release smartphones in the United Kingdom. Lenovo said that the launch would go forward regardless of whether or not its deal to purchase Motorola wins regulatory approval. As of March 2014, Lenovo was working with Vodafone and other carriers to ensure that its phones are compatible with their networks. Lenovo expects to release its first products intended for Britain at the IFA trade show in Germany in September 2014. Lenovo said that entering the British market would take about nine months due to the fact that most phones in the United Kingdom are sold with service contracts. Carriers have strict requirements for the phones they sell. Lenovo plans to use its current distributors, Exertis Micro-P, Ingram Micro, and Tech Data to sell its mobile phones.

In late April 2014, Lenovo announced that it projects selling 80 million smartphones worldwide in the fiscal year that began on 1 April. Lenovo said that it expects smartphones and tablets to drive its profits in 2014. Yang Yuanqing said, "We have to look outside China for a bigger market share and higher profit margins." He also stated that adding that its partnership with Google, owner of the Android operating system was getting stronger due to Lenovo's acquisition of Motorola Mobility.

In the fourth quarter of 2014, Motorola's sales grew by 118% year-on-year on a unit basis. Lenovo generally maintains geographic separation of the "Lenovo" and "Motorola" brands in smartphones. For example, Japan where as of May 2015, neither brand of phone was sold, will be reserved exclusively for Motorola. In China, both brands are sold after the re-introduction of Motorola smartphones after a two-year absence. Both brands are also sold in India. Lenovo announced in April 2015, that the two brands would continue to operate separately in India.

=== Branding ===
The "Le" series of devices, including the LePhone, LePad, and the LeTV (Not to be confused as the LeTV series of hardware and streaming platform by LeEco) were sold under the "idea" brand outside of China. The LePhone was thus known as the "ideaphone" in other markets. The "Le" pre-fix means "happy" in Mandarin Chinese and this branding is only used in mainland China.

In early 2013, Lenovo signed an endorsement deal with Kobe Bryant. Lenovo says Bryant was selected in order to further internationalize its brand while appealing to young consumers. Bryant made numerous appearances on behalf of Lenovo and was its main smartphone marketing campaign of the year in Asia.

== Mergers, acquisitions, subsidiaries, and partnerships ==
Lenovo sold its mobile phone division in 2008 to focus on its personal computer business and then paid $200 million to buy it back in November 2009. Lenovo re-acquired its mobile division to focus on mobile internet devices such as smartphones and tablet computers.

=== Motorola Mobility ===
On 29 January 2014, Google announced it would sell Motorola Mobility to Lenovo for US$2.91 billion in a cash-and-stock deal. When Google and Lenovo first announced the acquisition of Motorola, they said the purchase would be funded with $660 million in cash, $750 million in Lenovo stock, and a $1.5 billion promissory note due in three years. As of February 2014, Google owns about 5.94% of Lenovo's stock. The deal includes smartphone lines like the Motorola Moto X and Moto G and the Droid Maxx. Lenovo also acquired the future Motorola Mobility product roadmap. Google will retain the Advanced Technologies & Projects unit and all but 2000 of the company's patents. Larry Page of Google said of the sale that "the smartphone market is super competitive, and to thrive, it helps to be all-in when it comes to making mobile devices. It's why we believe that Motorola will be better served by Lenovo—which has a rapidly growing smartphone business and is the largest (and fastest-growing) PC manufacturer in the world."

Yang Yuanqing stated that "the acquisition of such an iconic brand, innovative product portfolio, and incredibly talented global team will immediately make Lenovo a strong global competitor in smartphones." Yang also said, "Don’t be scared by the $1 billion-a-year loss. We will improve that even from day one. Google is very good at software, ecosystems and services. But we are stronger in the manufacturing of devices." Yang said that Lenovo would make Motorola profitable within six quarters.

In March 2014, Yang Yuanqing said that Lenovo would continue using the Motorola brand name. Yang said that he wanted to exploit Motorola's reputation as an excellent manufacturer in North American and European markets. He used the term "mind share." Yang said that Lenovo planned to tie itself to Motorola in the minds of consumers with a tag line such as "Motorola by Lenovo" or "A Lenovo Company." As of May 2014, Lenovo was the fourth largest phone manufacturer in the world by unit sales, putting it behind Apple, Samsung, and Huawei. However, Lenovo owes most of its mobile market share to China, which is the world's largest market for mobile devices. According to reports, Lenovo has received about 2 million smartphone orders from China.

Lenovo believes that Motorola will help put it on the map as mobile device maker in developed markets such as the United States and Europe. Yang Yuanqing said, "Motorola is a good brand with worldwide awareness. This is the company that invented mobile phone, not just smartphones. Motorola will give us a good retail relationship. It has a strong portfolio of IP and rights and will help us become one of the clear global leaders. We will not be satisfied with number three, we will want to be number two in the future."

Lenovo had expressed interest in acquiring Motorola's hardware business immediately after it had been acquired by Google. Three years later, Lenovo's successful bid for Motorola Mobility began with a phone call from Eric Schmidt, asking if Lenovo was still interested in an acquisition. Lenovo immediately expressed interest. Liu Jun, an executive vice president at Lenovo in charge of mobile devices, said, "We first approached Moto when Google first announced the acquisition. Google was the owner of Android and we thought maybe it wouldn't want to own the hardware side of the business," said Liu Jun, EVP President of mobile for Lenovo to TechRadar. To us, it was clear that Google wanted to own the IPs. So we thought we had an opportunity to own the hardware side. Google initially tried to do the hardware itself but then a year and a half later they reconsidered their strategy. The end of last year we got a call from Google, from Eric Schmidt. We were asked if we still had the interest. We always thought Motorola was a good buy so we said yes and signed the contract quickly."

In April 2014, Lenovo announced that the first smartphone developed jointly with Motorola would be released in October or November of the same year. Since the announcement of its acquisition by Lenovo, Motorola Mobility has focused on quickly increasing sales value through aggressive online promotions in the United States, Brazil, Mexico, and India. As of 2014, Motorola had increased its sales in India to at least one million smartphones each quarter through cooperation with the Indian e-commerce firm Flipkart.

As of November 2014, the Lenovo and Motorola brands held a combined 7.8% of global smartphone shipments, making Lenovo the third largest company in this market. Motorola is key to Lenovo's strategy of expanding abroad in order to escape slowing growth in the Chinese smartphone market. Lenovo plans to introduce Motorola's products in China where they will be positioned as a high-end brand. Motorola's smartphones have a higher profit-margin than Lenovo-branded phones and will thus enhance earnings. As of November 2014, Lenovo and Motorola were discussing how to use Lenovo's factories to manufacture some of its phones. This would help reduce costs by allowing Motorola to use Lenovo's well-developed supply chain to cut costs for components such as camera modules. This in turn could allow Motorola to enhance its products without raising prices.

=== ZUK ===
ZUK Mobile is a subsidiary of Lenovo that sells exclusively using its own brand. Each letter of "ZUK" is pronounced separately. ZUK was originally dubbed Shenqi. ZUK is a part of Lenovo's strategy to sell higher quality, higher margin devices with a "young, refreshed brand." Xiaomi is considered ZUK's primary competitor. ZUK will market its products worldwide.

=== NEC ===
In April 2014, Lenovo purchased a portfolio of patents from NEC related to mobile technology. These include over 3,800 patent families in countries around the world. The purchase includes standard essential patents for 3G and LTE cellular technologies and other patents related to smartphones and tablets.

=== JD.com ===
In May 2014, Lenovo announced what it called a "strategic deal" with the Chinese e-commerce firm JD.com. Lenovo and JD.com signed a contract worth 12 billion Chinese yuan covering joint product development, marketing, internet-based promotions, post-sales logistics, and post-sales services. Lenovo launched its first phone designed as a platform for commerce, the S8, exclusively on JD.com on 28 April 2014. Lenovo plans to sell 5 million phones through JD.com in 2014.

=== Medion ===
In 2011 Lenovo purchased Medion AG for around $900 million. They sell smartphones under the Medion brand, mainly in Europe, such as the Medion LIFE smartphone range.

== Operations ==
In May 2012, Lenovo announced an investment of US$793 million in the construction of a mobile phone research and development facility and factory in Wuhan, China. The facility, called the Lenovo Industrial Base, was scheduled to start operations in October 2013. In March 2014, Lenovo renamed its mobile device division to the Mobile Business Group. It was formerly known as the Mobile Internet and Digital Home Group.

In August 2015, Lenovo announced that except for ZUK, all of its mobile phone business would be folded into Motorola Mobility. The Lenovo brand name will no longer be used on smartphones. This move is a part of Lenovo's strategy to reduce its product lineup while improving quality. Other Chinese phone makers such as ZTE, Huawei, and Coolpad are pursuing a similar strategy and have given up releasing dozens, sometimes hundreds of models per year. Smartphone makers are responding to weak demand due to market saturation; unit volume decreased 21.9% in the Chinese mobile phone market in 2014, according to the Chinese Academy of Telecommunications Research.

Lenovo manufactures smartphones such as the second generation Moto E and Lenovo K3 Note in Chennai, India under a contract with Flextronics. As of August 2015, the Lenovo plant in Chennai can produce six million phones per year. The Chennai facility only manufactures for the Indian market. It employees 1,500 people.

== Hardware and software ==
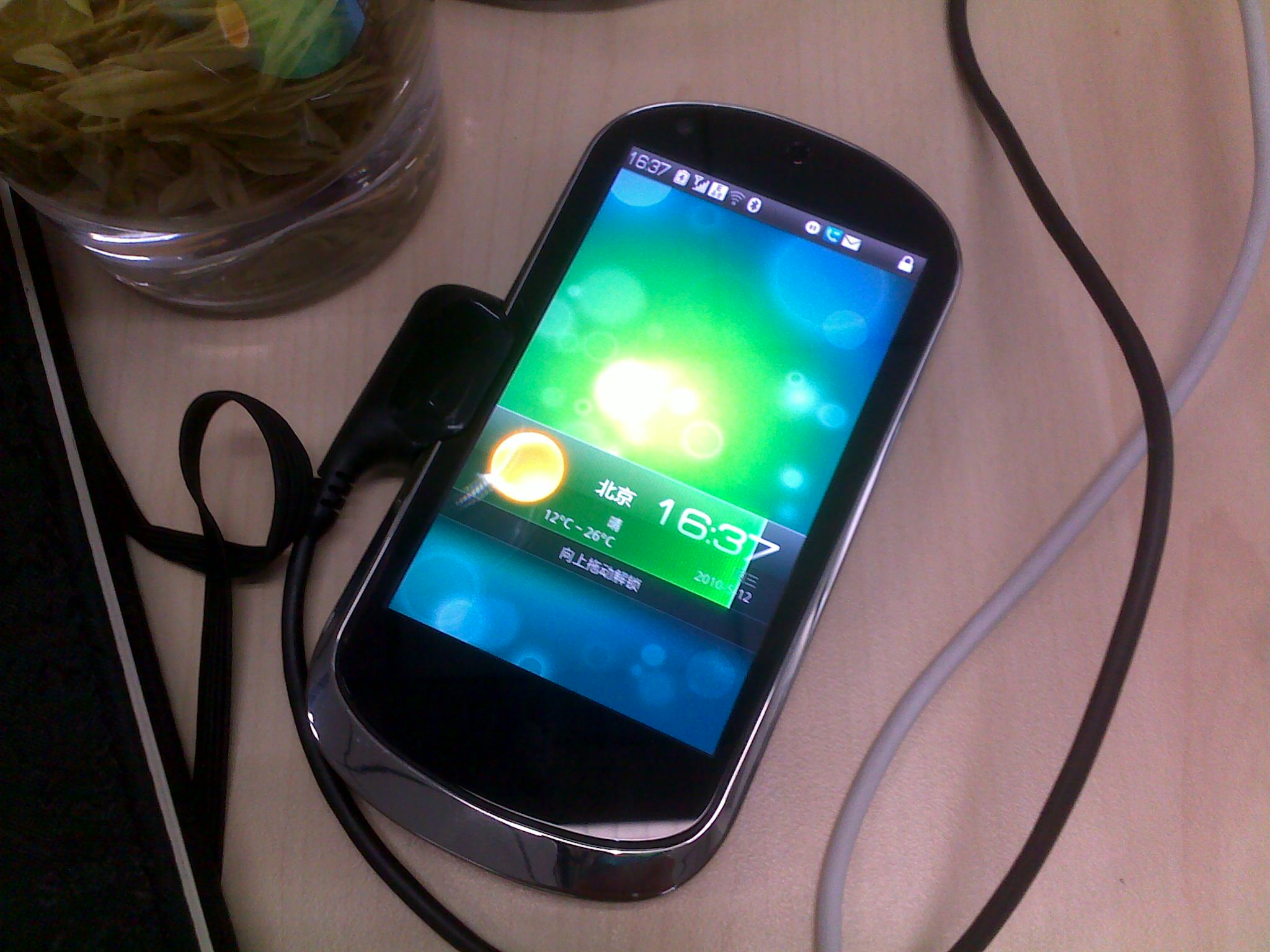
LePhone S1 charging

All past and current Lenovo smartphones use a customized version of the Android operating system produced by the Open Handset Alliance led by Google.

Numerous press reports indicated that Lenovo plans to release a phone based on Microsoft's Windows Phone. According to JD Howard, a vice president at Lenovo's mobile division, the company will release a Windows-based phone if there is market demand. A Windows-based phone from Lenovo would be a potentially formidable competitor against Nokia's Lumia line of smartphones.

At Mobile World Congress in February 2014, Microsoft announced Lenovo as one of its new Windows Phone 8.1 OEMs; but it wasn't until March 2015 when Microsoft officially confirmed that Lenovo would manufacture at least one Windows smartphone in time for the launch of Windows 10 Mobile.

Lenovo invested 100 million yuan in a fund dedicated to providing seed funding for mobile application development for its LeGarden online app store available for Chinese users. As of 2010, LeGarden had more than 1,000 programs available for download to users of the LePhone. At the same time, LeGarden counted 2,774 individual developers and 542 developer companies as members.

Lenovo uses MediaTek's turnkey chipsets that allow mobile phone manufacturers to focus on improved industrial design and software while reducing costs. As of November 2013, Lenovo has released four phones using MediaTek chipsets. Lenovo also has what it calls a "strong relationship" with Intel and Qualcomm.

Lenovo smartphones support the GSM standard, China's indigenous TD-SCDMA 3G standard used by China Mobile, the WCDMA 3G standard used by China Unicom, and China Telecom's CDMA 2000 network.

== Lenovo-branded phones ==
=== K800 ===
Lenovo unveiled the K800 smart phone at the 2012 Consumer Electronics Show in Las Vegas, Nevada. The K800 uses an Intel Atom Z2460 processor which makes use of hyper-threading technology to increase its computing power. The K800 has a 4.5-inch display with 720p resolution. The K800's camera has 8-megapixel resolution. The demo model shown at CES in 2012 was running the Gingerbread version of Android.

=== K900 ===
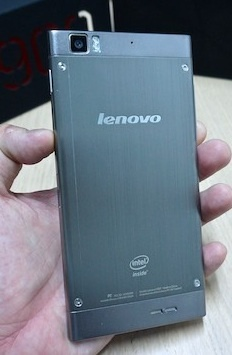
K900Back

The K900 is a high-end smartphone with a 1080p 5.5-inch screen using IPS technology. The K900's screen has more than 400 pixels per inch and is made with Corning's Gorilla Glass 2. The K900 is only 6.9 mm thick and weighs only 162 grams. The K900 case is made with a composite of stainless steel and polycarbonate formed in a unibody mold. The K900 runs on the Intel Atom Z2580 processor, a dual-core chip, which runs up to 2.0 GHz and utilizes Intel's hyper-threading technology to improve performance. The device also uses as the graphic engine Imagination Technologies' PowerVR SGX 544MP2 GPU.

The K900's camera is one of its distinctive features. It captures pictures with a resolution of 13 megapixels and has a large aperture f1.8 lens. The K900's lens allows it to take clear photos in low-light conditions without using a flash. The K900 was the first smartphone to use a f1.8 lens. The front camera has a wide 88-degree viewing angle in order to make self-photos and video chat more convenient.

The K900 was designed specifically with emerging markets in Asia in mind. As of May 2013, Lenovo sells the K900 in China, India, Indonesia, Russia, the Philippines, and Vietnam. Lenovo plans to sell the K900 in ten additional markets by the end of the same year.

=== A750 ===
The Lenovo A750 smartphone went on sale in March 2012. The device is powered by a MTK CortexTM-A9 microprocessor and an embedded PowerVR SGX 531 Pro graphics chip. The device features 512 MB of eDRAM. It is powered by a 2000 mAh Li-ion rechargeable battery that is designed to be user-replaceable.

The device features a rear-facing backside illumination 5-megapixel camera as well as a 2-megapixel camera on the front. It features a microSD slot which supports up to 32 GB in addition to the built-in ROM which allows for user-expandable storage.

The Lenovo A750 runs the Android platform and uses the Lenovo Four-leafed Clover user interface.

=== A820 ===
The A820 is another popular dual-SIM smartphone, which in this case is equipped with an ARM Quad Cortex-A7 MediaTek MT6589 CPU. The phone belongs to the A series which is an entry-level group of Lenovo mobile devices. But having a relatively fast 1.2 GHz quad-core CPU, 4.5-inch 540×960 (qHD) resolution IPS screen (although covered with a standard non-Gorilla glass) and 1 GB of RAM memory, made it a quite powerful product when released in March 2013. Lenovo A820 is quite popular in many countries, despite the fact that it is directly available only in China, India, Indonesia, Russia, the Philippines, and Vietnam. In a review for Mobile Network Comparison the author summarized that Lenovo A820 "offers incomparable value compared to almost any phone available on British high streets."

=== Vibe X ===
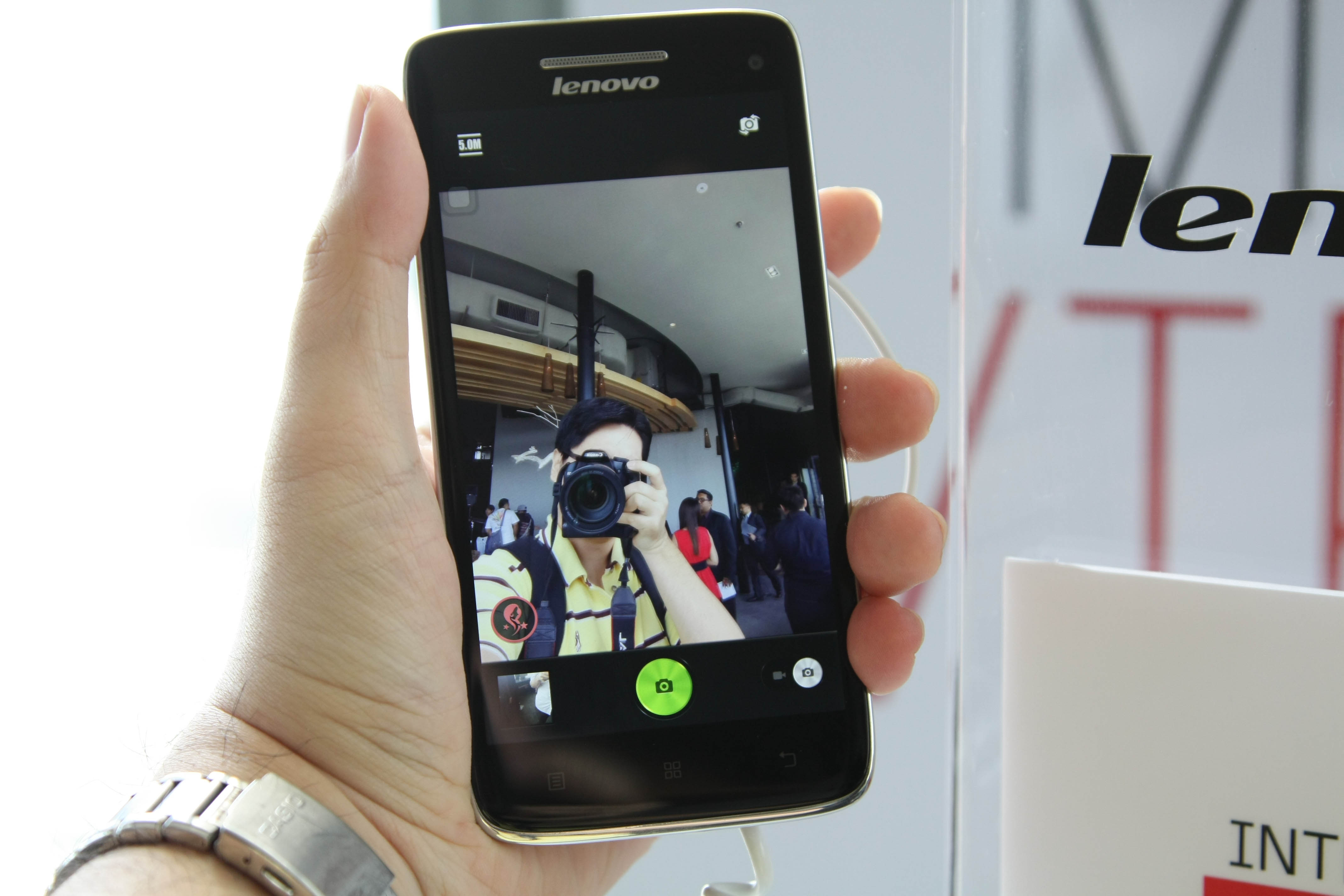
LenovoVibeXCamera

The Vibe X was unveiled at the IFA 2013 show in Berlin, Germany. Lenovo hopes that the Vibe X will help it expand its smartphone market share outside of China. The Vibe X's main feature is a 5-inch 1080p display made with scratch resistant Gorilla Glass 3 from Corning. At this size a 1080p display has a pixel density of 440 pixels per inch.

=== Vibe X2 ===
The Vibe X2 is an Android smartphone with a 5-inch 1080p screen. It has three colors set in layers and an angular design with no curved edges and a flat back. It weighs 120 grams is 7.27 millimeters thick. An option is offered for the Vibe Xtension, a battery pack in the form of an additional 5.1 millimeter layer to the back of the phone. 32 gigabytes of storage come standard. It has an 8-core MediaTek MT6595 processor and works with LTE. It runs Android 4.4 "KitKat" with Lenovo's Vibe 2.0 user interface.

=== Vibe Z2 ===
Lenovo called the Vibe Z2 a "selfie phone." The Z2 has a back-facing camera with 13 megapixels of resolution and a front-facing camera with 8 megapixels. The Z2 has a 64-bit Qualcomm processor, 32 gigabytes of storage, a 720p 5.5-inch display, and has dual SIM slots. The battery is rated at 3,000 mAh. LTE is supported. The body is 7.8 mm thick and has unibody design.

=== Vibe Z ===
The Lenovo Vibe Z is a high-end Android smartphone that accepts dual SIMs. It is 7.99 mm thick and has 5.5-inch display. The Vibe Z uses a relatively large 1/3.06-inch backlit camera sensor paired with a f/1.8 lens and a dual-LED flash in order to achieve good low-light performance. The front-facing camera has a wide-angle lens with an 84-degree field of view.

=== Vibe Z2 Pro ===
The Vibe Z2 Pro is a high-end Android 4.4 smartphone with a six-inch high-resolution screen (2,560 by 1,440). The phone also has a metal unibody frame and a 4,000 mAh battery. The Pro is 7.7 mm thick and weighs 179 grams. It runs a 2.5 gigahertz Snapdragon 801 chipset with 3 gigabytes of RAM. Its camera has 16 megapixels of resolution, a dual LED flash, and optical image stabilization. It can accommodate two SIMs. 32 gigabytes of internal storage is standard.

=== Vibe Shot ===
Lenovo introduced the Vibe Shot smartphone at the 2015 World Mobile Congress. The device's rear camera has a 16-megapixel sensor with a six-piece modular lens, autofocus that uses an infrared sensor, a tri-color LED flash, and optical image stabilization. A hardware shutter button is included in order to avoid the need to open the camera application. It has an 8-core Snapdragon 615 SoC processor that runs at 1.7 gigahertz, 3 gigabytes of RAM, 32 gigabytes of internal storage, and a five-inch display with 1080p resolution. The Vibe Shot runs on the Android 5.0 operating system.

=== Vibe S1 ===
Lenovo released the Vibe S1 in India in November 2015. It is a mid-range smartphone will a metal frame and Gorilla Glass-coated screen and back. It has 5-inch 1080 by 1920 pixel display, a MediaTek MT6752 processor, 3 gigabytes of RAM, 32 gigabytes of storage, a 13-megapixel real camera, an 8-megapixel front camera with a 2-megapixel secondary depth sensor, two SIM card slots, a 2420-man battery, support for LTE cellular data, and the Android 5.1 operating system.

=== Lenovo A7000 ===
The Lenovo A7000 is a big-screen Android mid-ranger, sold as "entertainment on a budget." The external features include a 5.5-inch IPS HD display, 1280 × 720 pixels (267 ppi - xhdpi), Android 6.0 (marshmallow) upgrade from Android 5.0 (Lollipop). One speaker (Dolby Atmos certified), an 8-megapixel main auto focus camera with LED flash and a 5-megapixel front camera. Internally, it has a 1.5 GHz 8-core (Cortex-A53) MediaTek MT6752M 64-bit processor with 2.GB of RAM, 8-16 GB of storage with room for a 32 GB SD card, and a 2900+ mAH rated battery. Lenovo A7000 covers are available on Madanyu.

=== Lenovo K3 Note ===
Lenovo K3 Note is a mid-range smartphone and later in June is launched in India. It features a 5.5 inches FHD display and it powered by 1.7 GHz 8-core (Cortex-A53) Mediatek MT6752 64-bit processor and 4 GB RAM and 16 GB of storage with μSD card support up to 64 GB. The K3 Note differ from the A7000 with a sharper 5.5-inch Full HD (1920 X 1080 pixels) IPS display. It has a 13 Megapixel rear camera with LED flash and 5 Megapixel front camera. K3 Note runs on Android 5.0 (Lollipop) OS and has 16 GB internal storage along with microSD slot. This can be upgraded to android Marshmallow 6.0 via official updates. Two versions of this phone is available. K50a40 rest of the world and K50-t5 which is designed to china mainland. This phone has dual SIM slots and a 2900 mAh battery.

=== Lenovo K4 Note ===
The Lenovo K4 Note was launched in early 2016. The K4 note is 3.5 mm thick at its thinnest point and weighs 158 grams. It has a 5.5-inch 1080p display with a contrast ratio of 1000 to 1 protected by Gorilla Glass 3. It uses a MediaTek MT6753 processor, with three gigabytes of RAM. It runs Android 5.1 customized with Lenovo's Vibe user interface. The operating system will be updated to Android 6.0. 16 gigabytes of storage come standard. Storage may be expanded up to 128 gigabytes via microSD card. Lenovo K4 has a fingerprint scanner on back and it also come with Dolby Atmos. The rear camera uses a 13-megapixel sensor with fast focus. The front camera uses a five-megapixel sensor with focus. Lenovo also launched the Wooden Edition of K4 Note in India on 14 July 2016 with same set of specifications.

=== VIBE K5 and VIBE K5 Plus ===
The VIBE K5 is a low-end high specification smartphone with a 5-inch screen launched at the Mobile World Congress in early 2016. It runs Android 5.1, commonly known as "Lollipop". It uses a 64-bit Snapdragon 415 processor and has 2 gigabytes of memory. A microSD card slot allows for the expansion of internal storage. The battery has a capacity of 2,750 mAh and is interchangeable. Lenovo claims the device achieves 15.1 hours of talkative on 3G. The K5 Plus is almost identical but includes a faster Snapdragon 616 processor.

On 1 August 2016, Lenovo launched the 3 GB RAM variant of the Vibe K5 Plus in India. Apart from increasing the amount of RAM, Lenovo has also increased the external storage from 32 GB to 128 GB without an increase in price. Lenovo K6 Power is the successor to the K5 plus.

=== VIBE K5 Note ===
On 1 August 2016, Lenovo launched the Vibe K5 Note in India. The device is offered in two variants in India - 3 GB RAM and 4 GB RAM. It's powered by MediaTek's Helio P10 octa-core processor and runs on Android 6.0 Marshmallow out of the box. It has a battery capacity of 3500 mAh.

=== Lenovo K6 Note ===
The Lenovo K6 Note is a smartphone with 64-bit octacore processor, a 5.5" full HD display and a 4000 mAh battery. A fingerprint sensor and a 16 MP rear camera plus an 8 MP front camera are built in the metall housing.

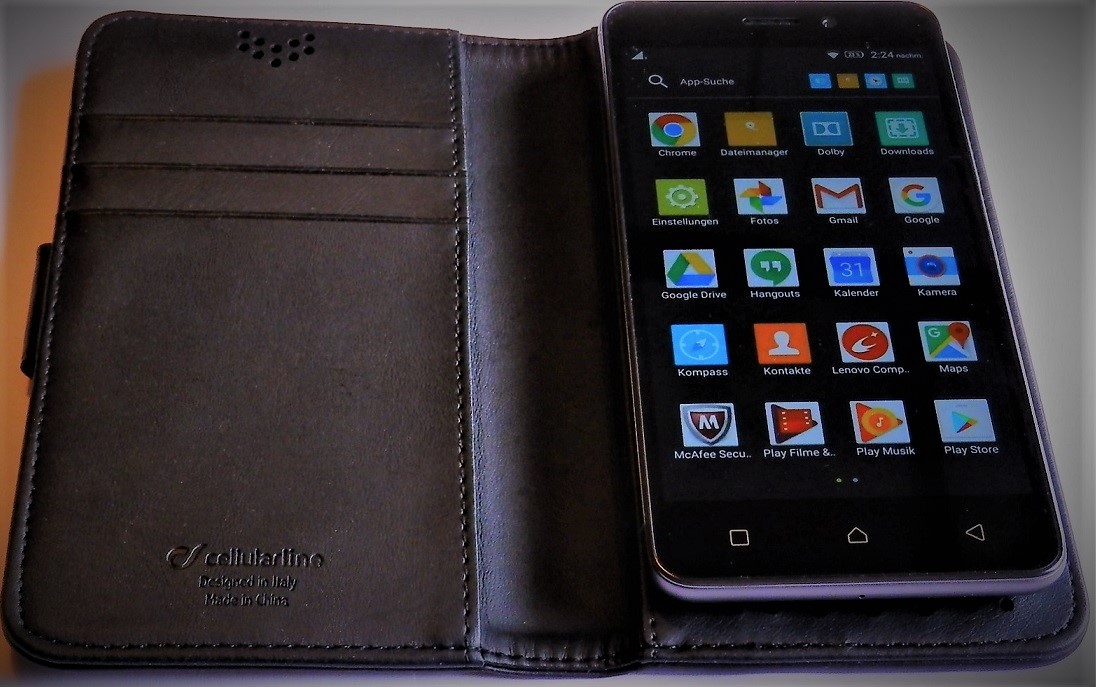
Lenovo K6

=== Lenovo K8 Note ===
The Lenovo K8 Note is a solid upgrade over the earlier device (Lenovo K6 Note) and comes with 5.5 inches Full HD display and is powered by Helio X23 Deca core processor and is coupled with either 3 GB or 4 GB of RAM. The smartphone also highlights a dual camera setup on the backside and it has a 13 MP+ 5 MP combination with a 13 MP front camera. It has a battery capacity of 4000 mAh.

=== Lenovo Smart Cast ===
Lenovo announced the Smart Cast at its 2015 Lenovo Tech World conference in Beijing. The Smart Cast is an Android-based smartphone that uses a built-in laser projector to project a full-sized keyboard onto the surface below the phone. In addition to input, the projector can also cast movies and games. The image always stays in focus due to the fact that it is laser based.

=== Lenovo Lemon 3 ===
The Lenovo Lemon 3 was launched in early 2016. It has 5-inch 1080 by 1920 pixel IPS display, a 1.5-gigahertz Qualcomm Snapdragon 616 system-on-a-chip, 2 gigabytes of memory, an Adreno 405 graphics processor, 16 gigabytes of built-in storage, and dual SIM card slots. It supports 4G LTE including the radio bands used in India. Its battery has a capacity of 2750 mAh; Lenovo claims this will deliver 15 days of standby time on 4G or 6.2 hours of continuous video playback. Storage can be expanded with a microSD card.

=== Lenovo Vibe B ===
In 2016 Lenovo launched an entry-level 4G smartphone branded Lenovo Vibe B, with Android 6.0 Marshmallow.

=== Lenovo Z series ===
The current line of Lenovo Z series smartphone are considered as a spiritual success of their previous ZUK series, as they continue to run on ZUI which is an Android skin developed by ZUK. The first model that was branded under Z series was the Z2 series which is a rebranded ZUK Z2.

Most of the Z series only sold in China, while couple of the model did release in the global market including Z5 and Z6 series.

== Motorola-branded phones ==
=== Moto X ===
Moto X is an Android smartphone. Released in August 2013, it was among the company's first new products after its acquisition by Google in 2012. Initially called the "X Phone," Moto X was primarily aimed at mainstream consumers, distinguished by features taking advantage of voice recognition and contextual awareness, the ability for users to custom-order the device in their own choice of color options, and emphasizing the fact that the phone had final assembly completed in the United States.

Motorola began taking preorders for the Moto X in China on 27 January 2015. Motorola announced on Weibo that it had received one million preorders for the device. Since no deposit was required to preorder, it is possible that many fewer units will be sold. Prior to early 2015, Motorola had been absent from the Chinese market for two years.

In May 2015, Lenovo started selling customized Moto X phones in China using its Moto Maker online platform. Moto Maker allows customization of the front color, back color, materials, accent colors, memory size, and wallpapers. Users can have their name or a personal message laser-etched on the back. Available materials included wood, genuine leather, and plastic.

=== Moto G ===
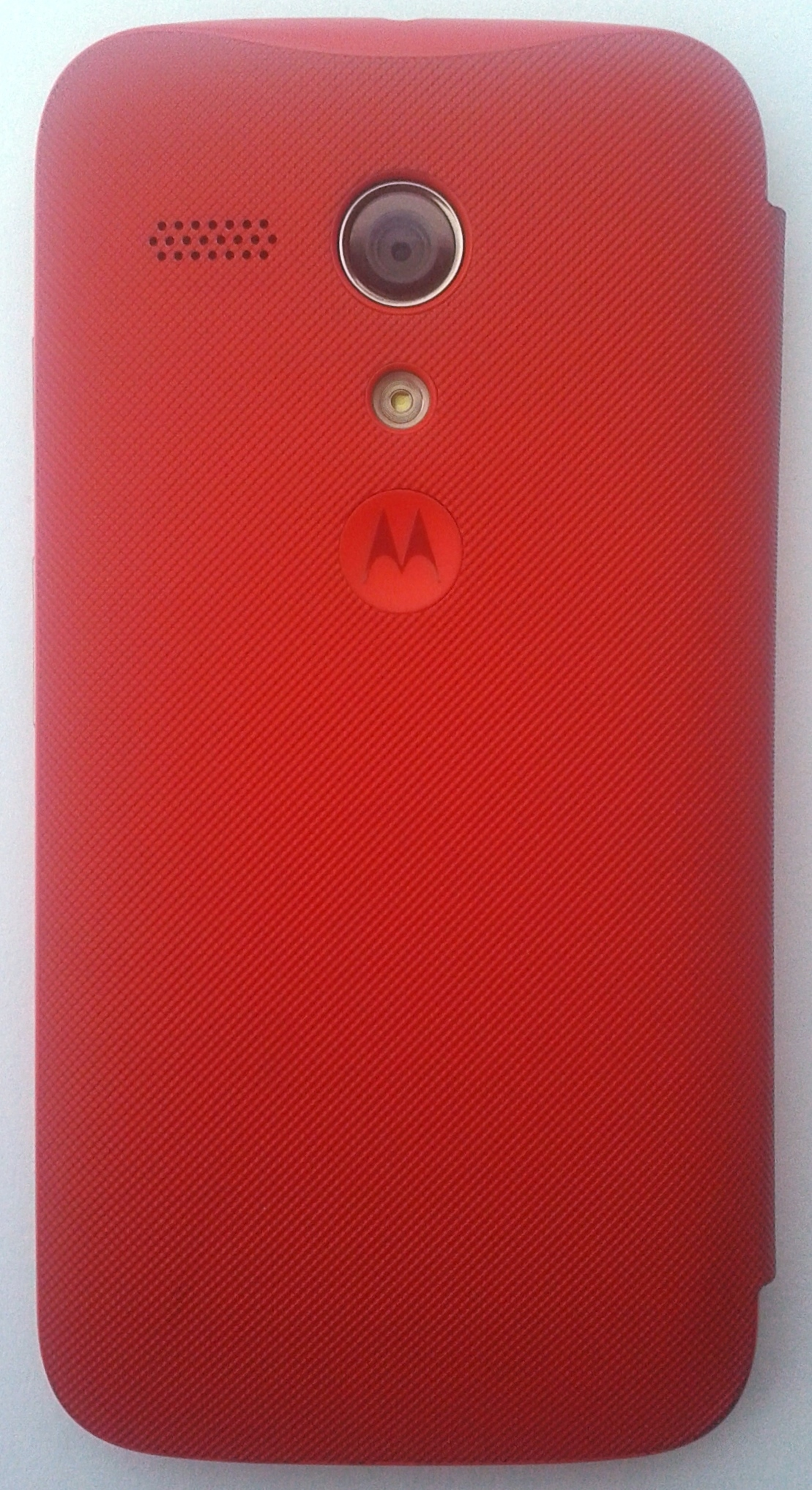
Moto G Flip Shell red

Moto G is an Android smartphone. Unveiled on 13 November 2013, the phone was initially aimed at developing markets. After six months on the market, the Moto G was Motorola's best-selling smartphone ever, and was the top selling phone in Mexico and Brazil.

=== Moto E ===
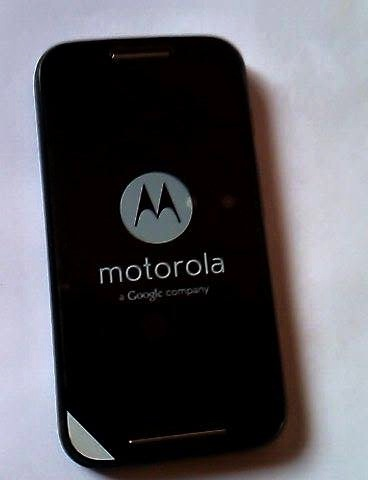
Moto E Black

The Moto E is an entry-level device that is intended to compete against feature phones by providing a durable, low-cost device for first-time smartphone owners or budget-minded consumers, with a particular emphasis on emerging markets.The device was unveiled on 13 May 2014, and made available at online retailers in India and the United States the same day. In India, the release of the Moto E was met with high demand and crashed the website of Flipkart, the online retailer marketing the device in the country.

=== Droid Turbo 2 ===
The Droid Turbo 2 is an Android smartphone sold in the United States under the Verizon Droid brand. Outside of the United States, it is branded as the Moto X Force. It was released on October 27, 2015. This phone is marketed as having "the world's first shatterproof screen."

== ZUK-branded phones ==
=== Z1 ===
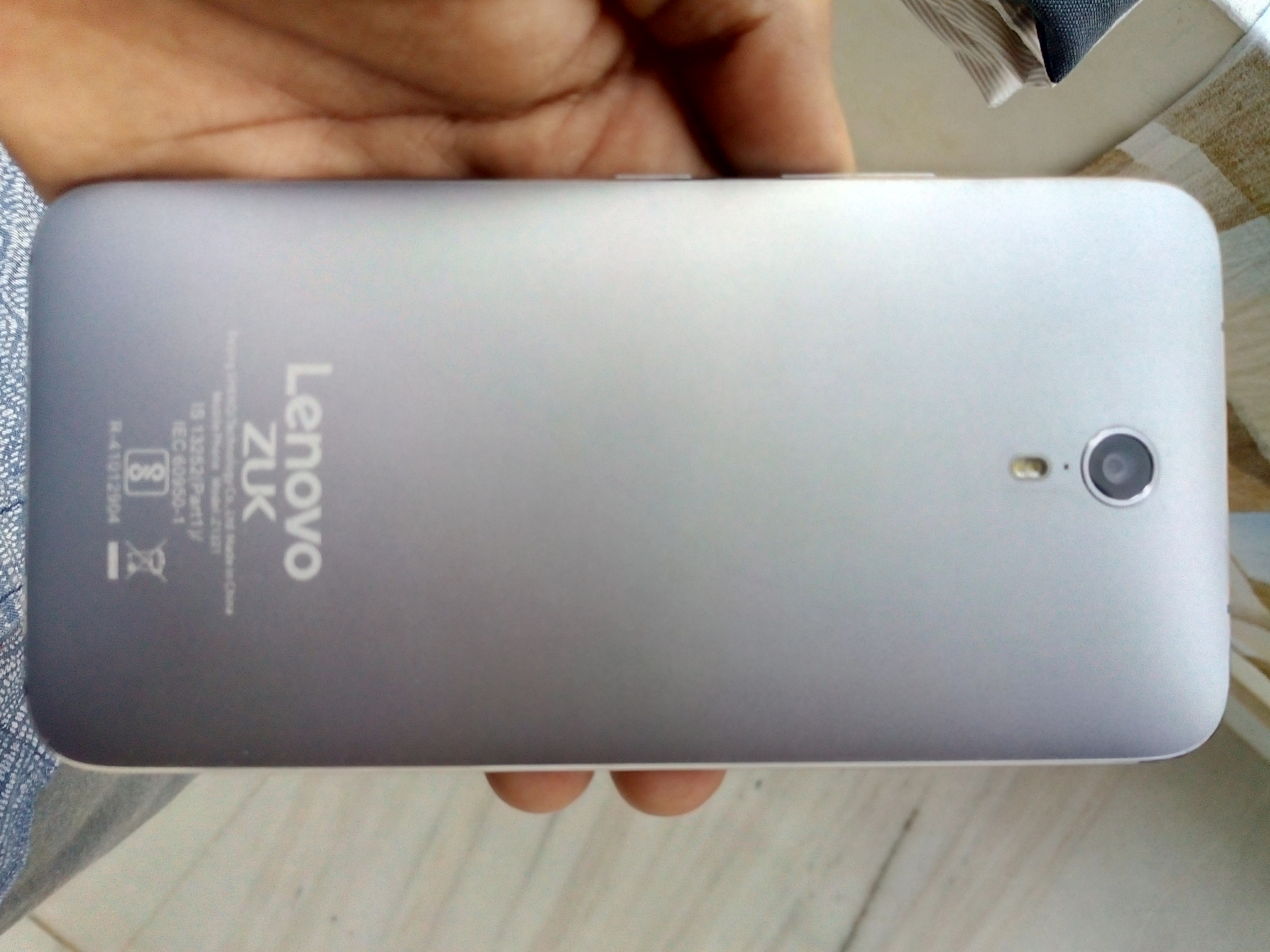
Lenovo Zuk Z1

The Z1 is ZUK's "flagship" smartphone, unveiled in August 2015. It has a 5.5-inch 1080p display, 64 gigabytes of internal storage, a 13-megapixel rear camera, a 4,100 mAh battery, a Qualcomm Snapdragon 801 CPU, 3 gigabytes of RAM, a USB-C port for charging and audio, and a fingerprint reader. The international version of the Z1 runs Cyanogen OS 12.1, a variant of Android OS. But the same is not yet update to Cyanogen os 13, based on android 6 "Marshmallow" and it is doubtful whether it will ever be updated. The Z1 is sold in China with ZUK's own ZUI version of Android.

=== Z2 ===
The Z2 was released 31 May 2016. It uses Qualcomm Snapdragon 820 system-on-a-chip.

=== Transparent concept phone ===
The device on display had nearly no bezel and was completely transparent when powered off. Shrinking batteries and other electronic components enough to fit them in a small bezel is they key challenge preventing ZUK and other companies from bringing such phones to market.

== Lenovo Connect ==
At the Mobile World Congress in 2016, Lenovo introduced Lenovo Connect, a wireless roaming service. This service works across devices, networks, and international borders in China, Europe, the Middle East, and Africa. Lenovo Connect eliminates the need to buy new SIM cards when crossing borders. Lenovo Connect started service for phones and select ThinkPad laptops in China in February 2016.

== See also ==
- Advanced Mobile Phone System
- Comparison of high-definition smartphone displays
- Comparison of mobile phone standards
- List of mobile phone generations
- Smartphone
- Samsung Galaxy
- Huawei
- Oppo
- Xiaomi
