= ZUK Z1 =

Android-based Smartphone

- The front face view of the ZUK Z1 (White) running Cyanogen OS 12.1
- Manufacturer: ZUK Mobile (subsidiary of Lenovo)
- Type: Phablet
- First released: August 11, 2015; 10 years ago
- Availability by region: September 25, 2015; 10 years ago
- Successor: ZUK Z2 (January 2016)
- Related: Lenovo Vibe P1
- Compatible networks: GSM, WCDMA, LTE
- Form factor: Slate
- Dimensions: 155.7 mm (6.13 in) H 77.3 mm (3.04 in) W 8.9 mm (0.35 in) D
- Weight: 175 g (6.2 oz)
- Operating system: Android 5.1.1 "Lollipop": Cyanogen OS 12.1(global version) or ZUI (Chinese version)
- System-on-chip: Qualcomm Snapdragon 801 MSM8974PRO-AC r2p1
- CPU: 2.5 GHz (2457 MHz) quad-core Krait 400
- GPU: Adreno 330
- Memory: 3 GB 1866 MHz LPDDR3 RAM
- Storage: 64 GB
- Removable storage: None; Removable dual nano-SIM card slot
- Battery: 4100 mAh Li-Po
- Rear camera: Sony Exmor RS IMX214 13 megapixels (4160×3120 px), autofocus, optical image stabilization, dual-LED flash, 1080p@60fps, 720p@120fps, HDR
- Front camera: OmniVision OV8865 8 megapixels (3264x2448 px), 1080p@30fps
- Display: 5.5 in (140 mm) 1920x1080 pixel resolution, 401 ppi pixel density, 800:1 contrast ratio (typical); IPS LCD touchscreen, 16:9 aspect ratio, 600 cd/m2 max brightness (typical), and oleophobic coating
- Sound: Dual mono speakers, 3.5 mm stereo audio jack
- Connectivity: GSM/GPRS/EDGE: 850, 900, 1,800 and 1,900 MHz; Bands: 1/2/4/5/8; 3G (HSDPA 42 Mbit/s, HSUPA 5.8 Mbit/s): 850, 900, 1,900 and 2,100 MHz; LTE: 1,800, 1,900, 2,300 and 2,500 MHz; Bands: 1/3/7/38/39/40/41; Wi-Fi (802.11 a/b/g/n/ac) (2.4/5 GHz), Wi-Fi Direct, Wi-Fi hotspot, DLNA, Bluetooth 4.1, A2DP, A-GPS & GLONASS, USB OTG, USB-C, 3.5 mm headphone jack
- Data inputs: Multi-touch touchscreen display, triple microphone configuration, 3-axis gyroscope, 3-axis accelerometer, digital compass, proximity sensor, Fingerprint reader, ambient light sensor
- Model: Z1
- Codename: ham

The ZUK Z1 is an Android smartphone manufactured by ZUK Mobile, in collaboration with Lenovo. Unveiled in August 2015, it is the first product by ZUK. In most markets outside China, the ZUK Z1 ships with the Cyanogen OS operating system pre-installed. Cyanogen OS is a commercial variant of CyanogenMod. The device was released with Cyanogen OS 12.1, based on Android 5.1 "Lollipop", and was never updated to Cyanogen OS 13, based on Android 6.0 "Marshmallow". In China, the ZUK Z1 ships with its own ZUI distribution, based on Android 5.1 "Lollipop".

The phone was first made available for sale on 25 September 2015 for US$300 (equivalent to $407.48 in 2025).

In India the phone was launched at a price of Rs.13,999 on Amazon. However the updates for this phone were limited and soon the company stopped giving updates.

== See also ==
- OnePlus One
- Lenovo smartphones

Preceded by First model	ZUK Z1; 2015	Succeeded by ZUK Z2 (January 2016)
