= Lenovo Vibe Z =

Android smartphone

The Lenovo Vibe Z is an Android smartphone with a 5.5-inch screen released in late 2013.

== Design and performance ==
=== Software ===
The Vibe Z originally ran Android 4.2.2 "Jelly Bean". It now comes with Android 4.3 and Lenovo has announced an upgrade to 4.4 Lenovo customized the dialer in order to facilitate one handed dialling. Lenovo has also included numerous proprietary apps. SECUREit includes antivirus, child safety, privacy and anti-theft functionality. SYNCit backs up and restores contacts, messages, and call logs. SHAREit facilitates file sharing, including via direct connections using Bluetooth and ad-hoc wi-fi. Power Manager extends battery life and protects the battery from premature failure. UC Browser, Navigate 6, Skype, Twitter, Facebook, Accuweather, CamScanner, CamCard, Kingsoft Office, and some games like Asphalt 7 and Real Football 14 come pre-installed.

=== Hardware ===
The Vibe Z is powered by a 2.2 gigahertz Qualcomm Snapdragon 800 processor, the same processor used in the Samsung Galaxy Note 3 and the Sony Xperia Z1, and comes with 2 gigabytes of RAM. It has a 5.5-inch IPS display with 1080p resolution.

The Vibe Z uses a relatively large 1/3.06-inch backlit 13-megapixel camera sensor paired with a f/1.8 lens and a dual-LED flash in order to achieve good low-light performance and the ability to take ten pictures per second. Lenovo says that a proprietary low-light algorithm further enhances performance. The 5-megapixel front-facing camera has a wide-angle lens with an 84-degree field of view.

Lenovo offers a WCDMA + GSM model for China Unicom subscribers, a CDMA2000 + GSM model is available for use on China Telecom, and a LTE + GSM model for the international market.

The case is plastic but has metallic finish. It has an anti-fingerprint finish, like that on the Lenovo Vibe X, on its back. The backplate is sealed and cannot be removed to access the battery. The cover includes a touchpad that allows users to accept and reject calls without opening it. The power button is located on top of the shell. The volume rocker is on the left side, while the right side only has a retractable tray for SIM cards. The bottom of the Vibe Z has a standard headset port and a Micro USB port. Lenovo is selling flip covers in multiple colors for the Vibe Z.

Lenovo says its battery offers up to 278 hours of standby time.

== Reviews ==
A review published in Gizbot stated, "If you still haven't checked out the super dual cameras that are available with the Vibe Z, it's high time you did yourself a favor and checked out YouTube for related camera videos. And if you don't have that much time in your hand, let us tell you that Vibe Z makes a strong statement with its 5-megapixel front camera and 84° wide angle lens for high quality self shots, apart from amazing video chat quality. Users can also snap sensational low light images courtesy of a 13 megapixel rear camera in the rear that's fitted with BSI sensor, and can shoot 1080p HD videos."

A review published in Techradar stated, "I struggled to reach the lock button atop the phone with one hand. Lenovo made it so the volume rocker unlocks the phone, too. I had trouble reaching my thumb across the other side of the screen. Lenovo added a Smart Dialer that shifts the number pad buttons in the direction you tilt the phone for easier one-handed dialing. (Also, Smart Call allows you the answer the phone by just holding it to your ear.) The point is that Lenovo knows just how big its flagship phone is, and it's working to make it easier to operate the Vibe Z more like the phone that it is and less like the tablet that it isn't. Other handset makers are trying, but I've seen nothing this clever."

In a review for NDTV, Jamshed Avari wrote, "The Vibe Z doesn't feel as though it was made by the same company that regularly produces some of our favourite laptops. It comes across as something entirely new. Lenovo has thrown in a fair number of powerful components and has given the Vibe Z a very distinctive style, but it's the brand name that will ultimately persuade people to give it a chance. Camera irregularities aside, this is a pretty good phone."
