= Lenovo Vibe K4 Note =

Android-based smartphone

- Manufacturer: Lenovo Group Limited
- Type: Smartphone
- Series: K series
- First released: January 2016; 10 years ago (In India)
- Units sold: 1.8 Lakhs in the flash sale
- Successor: Lenovo K5 Note
- Compatible networks: 2G (GSM/GPRS/EDGE): 850, 900, 1,800 and 1,900 MHz; 3G (HSDPA HSUPA) 850, 900, 1,900 and 2,100 MHz; 4G (LTE): 800, 850, 900, 1,800, 2,100 and 2,600
- Form factor: Touchscreen
- Dimensions: 153/6 mm (5.59 in) H 76.5 mm (2.85 in) W 9.2 mm (0.31 in) D
- Weight: 158 g (6 oz)
- Operating system: Android 5.1.1 Lollipop, upgradeable to Android 6.0
- System-on-chip: Mediatek MT6753
- CPU: 1.3 GHz Octa-Core Cortex-A53
- GPU: ARM Mali T720MP3
- Memory: 2 GB (A7010), 3 GB (A7010a48) LLDDR2 RAM
- Storage: 16 GB, 32 GB microSD up to 256 GB
- Battery: 3300 mAh Li-ion
- Rear camera: 13 mega pixels ƒ/2.0 aperture 3.56 mm focal length 1080p video at 30 fps List: Dual LED flash; Autofocus; Geo tagging; Triaxial leveling; Zero shutter lag; Face beautification mode; Selective focus; Smile and face detection; White balance presets; Panorama; Self-timer; Voice activation
- Front camera: 5 mega pixels ƒ/2.2 aperture (1080p) HD video recording @ 30 fps
- Display: 5.5" 1080×1920 (401 Pixels per inch), IPS display
- Sound: Stereo speakers and Dolby Atmos
- Connectivity: ◦WLAN: Wi-Fi 802.11 dual band a/b/g/n/ac, Wi-Fi hotspot ◦Bluetooth: 4.0 A2DP, LE ◦Radio: FM Receiver
- Data inputs: Sensors: Fingerprint; Accelerometer; Gesture sensor; Proximity sensor; Compass
- Model: A7010a48; A7010; Vibe X3 lite
- SAR: 0.84W/kg (head)
- Website: https://www.lenovo.com/in/en/smartphones/smartphone-k-series/K4-Note/p/K4-Note

Lenovo Vibe K4 Note is a midrange Android smartphone launched by Lenovo Group Limited in January 2016. The phone features a 5.5 inch FHD display powered by MediaTek MT6753 SoC processor. It comes with two storage variants of 16 and 32 GB with 2 GB of RAM, for A7010 model and 3 GB of RAM for A7010a48 model. It has a battery capacity rated at 3300mAh. The device supports Theater max technology with a VR headset. In south and east Asian markets the device was packaged with an AntVR headset for this purpose. Upon its release, it received positive feedbacks and reviews from all parts of the world. Lenovo also launched its successor, K5 Note immediately after K4 Note's launch.
