= Lenovo Vibe X2 =

Android smartphone released in 2014

- Brand: Lenovo
- Manufacturer: Lenovo
- Type: Smartphone
- Series: Vibe
- First released: October 2014; 11 years ago
- Predecessor: Lenovo Vibe X
- Successor: Lenovo Vibe X3
- Compatible networks: 2G, 3G, 4G LTE
- Form factor: Touchscreen
- Colors: White; Gold; Red; Charcoal
- Dimensions: 140.2 mm (5.52 in) H 68.6 mm (2.70 in) W 7.27 mm (0.286 in) D
- Weight: 120 g (4.2 oz)
- Operating system: Android 4.4 KitKat (upgradable to 5.0 Lollipop) with Vibe UI 2.0
- System-on-chip: MediaTek MT6595M
- CPU: Octa-core (4x2.0 GHz Cortex-A17 & 4x1.7 GHz Cortex-A7)
- GPU: PowerVR G600
- Memory: 2 GB
- Storage: 32 GB
- Removable storage: No
- SIM: Dual SIM (Nano-SIM + Micro-SIM) in AP region/India; Single SIM (Micro-SIM) in other regions
- Battery: 2300 mAh Li-polymer (non-removable)
- Charging: microUSB 2.0
- Rear camera: 13 MP, auto-focus, LED flash
- Front camera: 5 MP, fixed-focus
- Display: 5.0 in (127 mm) Full HD IPS LCD (1920 × 1080 pixels)
- Water resistance: No
- Model: Lenovo X2-EU / X2-AP / X2-CU

The Lenovo Vibe X2 is an Android smartphone manufacutred and marketed by Lenovo. Announced on September 4, 2014 and launched in October 2014, the device endorsed for its distinct layered "three-layered" chassis design, which features multiple color blocks along its outer edge. It succeeded the original Lenovo Vibe X as part of Lenovo's high-end Vibe lineup.

It is one of the first Mediatek MT6595 smartphone to be released.

== Specifications ==
=== Hardware ===
The Lenovo Vibe X2 features a 5.0-inch Full HD IPS capacitive touchscreen with a resolution of 1920 × 1080 pixels and a pixel density of approximately 441 ppi. It measures 140.2 mm × 68.6 mm × 7.27 mm and weighs 120 grams.

Under the hood, the device is powered by a MediaTek MT6595M True8Core system-on-chip, featuring an octa-core processor configuration paired with PowerVR G600 graphics. It comes equipped with 2 GB of RAM and 32 GB of internal storage, which is non-expandable due to the absence of a microSD slot.

=== Cameras ===
The rear camera module is a 13-megapixel sensor with autofocus and an LED flash and the front panel houses a 5-megapixel fixed-focus camera. Network connectivity varies by region: models for the AP region and India feature dual SIM support (Nano-SIM and Micro-SIM), whereas other regional variants support a single Micro-SIM. The device is backed by an embedded 2300 mAh Li-polymer battery charged via a microUSB 2.0 port.

=== Software ===
The phone was shipped with Android 4.4 KitKat operating system customized with Lenovo's Vibe UI 2.0 interface, and was later made upgradable to Android 5.0 Lollipop.
