= Lenovo IdeaPhone A820 =

Smartphone

- Manufacturer: Lenovo
- Type: Touchscreen smartphone
- Series: A Series
- Compatible networks: (GSM/GPRS/EDGE): 900, 1,800 and 1,900 MHz; 3G: 900, and 2,100 MHz
- Form factor: Slate
- Dimensions: 135 mm (5.3 in) H 68.2 mm (2.69 in) W 9.9 mm (0.39 in) D.
- Weight: 151 g (5.3 oz)
- Operating system: Android 4.1.2 "Jelly Bean"
- System-on-chip: MediaTek MT6589
- CPU: Quad-core 1.2 GHz Cortex-A7
- GPU: PowerVR SGX544
- Memory: 1 GB RAM
- Storage: 4 GB
- Removable storage: microSD up to 32 GB
- Battery: 2000 mAh Li-ion
- Rear camera: 8 megapixels (3624x2448 px)
- Display: 4.5 in (110 mm) 960x540 px (245 ppi)

Lenovo IdeaPhone A820 is a dual-SIM, quad-core MediaTek MT6589 based smartphone belonging to the A series which is an entry-level group of Lenovo mobile communication products. It has been introduced to the market in March 2013.

== Design and features ==
The phone supports 900 MHz, 1800 MHz, 1900 MHz GSM bands as well as 900 MHz and 2100 MHz UMTS frequencies using GRPS, EDGE, HSDPA, HSUPA, HSPA and HSPA+ technology.

The CPU is Mediatek MT6589 1.2 GHz quad-core processor.

It has 4.5 inch IPS screen with a qHD resolution of 540x960 px displaying up to 16M colors and covered with a multitouch (up to 5 touch points) panel.

Graphics is run by an incorporated Imagination PowerVR SGX544 GPU.

RAM memory is 1 GB, internal eMMC memory size is 4 GiB, out of which 2.18 GiB is available as an internal SD card. Additionally, the smartphone supports external microSD/microSDHC card of a capacity up to 32 GiB.

The Li-ion battery capacity is 2000 mAh.

The phone dimensions are 135 x 68.2 x 9.9 mm (5.32 x 2.68 x 0.39 inch) with the weight being 145 g (5.11 oz).

Stock A820 is running Android 4.1.2 Jelly Bean operating system, although unofficial alternative ROMs exist using various Android OS versions.

== Reviews ==
Lenovo A820 received a very warm reception across the world, despite the fact that it is directly available only in China, India, Indonesia, Russia, the Philippines, and Vietnam. In a review for Mobile Network Comparison the author summarized that Lenovo A820 "offers incomparable value compared to almost any phone available on British high streets". It is criticized basically only for a lack of LED flash and a local Chinese stock ROM without multilingual and Google Play Store support.
