= Lenovo K6 Power =

Android smartphone

- Manufacturer: Lenovo Group Limited
- Type: Smartphone
- Series: K series
- First released: September 2016; 9 years ago (In India)
- Related: Lenovo K6 (K33a48)
- Compatible networks: 2G (GSM/GPRS/EDGE): 850, 900, 1,800 and 1,900 MHz; 3G (HSDPA HSUPA) 850, 900, 1,900 and 2,100 MHz; 4G (LTE): B3(TD1800), B5(FD850), B40(TD2300)
- Form factor: Touchscreen
- Dimensions: 141.9 mm (5.59 in) H 70.3 mm (2.77 in) W 9.3 mm (0.37 in) D
- Weight: 145 g (5 oz)
- Operating system: Android Marshmallow 6.0 upgradable to Android Nougat 7.0
- System-on-chip: Qualcomm Snapdragon 430
- CPU: 1.4 GHz Octa-Core ARM Cortex-A53
- GPU: Adreno 505
- Memory: 3 / 4 GB
- Storage: 32 GB microSD up to 256 GB
- Battery: 4000 mAh Li-Po, non-removable
- Rear camera: Sony IMX258 13 MP PDAF Camera with LED Flash
- Front camera: Sony IMX219 8.0 MP Camera
- Display: 5.0" 1080×1920 (441 Pixels per inch), IPS display
- Sound: Stereo speakers and Dolby Atmos
- Connectivity: WLAN: Wi-Fi 802.11 b/g/n, Wi-Fi hotspot; Bluetooth®: 4.2 A2DP, LE; Radio: FM Receiver
- Data inputs: List: Fingerprint; Accelerometer; Gyroscope; Proximity sensor; Compass
- Model: K33a42
- SAR: 0.600 W/kg (head),0.972 W/kg (body)
- Website: http://Lenovo.com

Lenovo K6 Power is a midrange Android smartphone launched by Lenovo Group Limited in September 2016. The device supports TheaterMax technology with a VR headset. It is the successor of Lenovo K5 Plus.

== Specifications ==
=== Design ===
The phone has a unibody metal (aluminium) design. It has a 5.0-inch display. Its physical dimensions are 141.9 mm × 70.3 mm × 9.3 mm (Length x Width x Thickness) and it weighs 145 grams.

=== Hardware ===
The phone features a 5.0-inch FHD display with 441 ppi pixel density. It comes with two storage variants of 16 GB with 2 GB RAM and 32 GB with 3 GB or 4 GB of RAM. It is powered by Qualcomm Snapdragon 430 SoC with an octa core 1.4 GHz Cortex-A53 processor and Adreno 505 GPU. It has a 13 MP rear camera and 8 MP selfie camera. It has a 4000 mAh Li-Po battery.

=== Software ===
Lenovo K6 Power runs on Android Marshmallow 6.0 and is upgradable to Android Nougat 7.0.

Latest version K33_S231_171114_ROW

=== Custom ROM ===
LineageOS 18.1 for Lenovo K6 Power

LineageOS 18.1 for Lenovo K6 Power (Daily Build)

TWRP Recovery for Lenovo K6 Power

=== Variant ===
K33a42 - Lenovo K6 Power - 4 GB/32 GB - 4000 mAh

K33a42 - Lenovo K6 Power - 3 GB/32 GB - 4000 mAh

K33a48 - Lenovo K6 - 3 GB/32 GB - 3000 mAh

K33b36 - Lenovo K6 - 2 GB/16 GB - 3000 mAh
