= Yang Yuanqing =

Chinese business executive and philanthropist

- 杨元庆
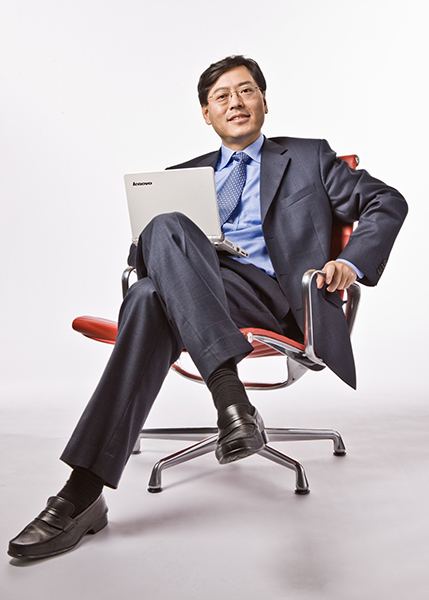
- Yang Yuanqing in 2008
- Born: 12 November 1964 (age 62); Hefei, Anhui, China
- Education: Shanghai Jiao Tong University (BA); University of Science and Technology of China (MSc)
- Known for: Chairman and CEO of Lenovo
- Spouse: Meng Qiuyue (孟秋月)
- Parent: Yang Furong

Yang Yuanqing (simplified Chinese: 杨元庆; traditional Chinese: 楊元慶; pinyin: Yáng Yuánqìng, born 12 November 1964) is a Chinese business executive and philanthropist who is the current chairman and CEO of Lenovo.

== Early life and education ==
Yang was born on 12 November 1964 to parents both educated as surgeons. He spent his childhood in Hefei in Anhui province. He grew up poor, as his parents were paid the same salaries as manual laborers. Yang's father, Yang Furong, was a disciplined man with strict standards. Yang said of his father, "If he set a target, no matter what happened, he wanted to reach it."

While his parents wanted him to pursue a career in medicine, and he had a budding interest in literature, Yang decided to study computer science on the advice of a family friend who was a university professor. Yang earned an undergraduate degree in computer science from Shanghai Jiaotong University in 1986 and graduated with a master's degree in computer science from the University of Science and Technology of China (USTC) in 1988.

== Lenovo ==
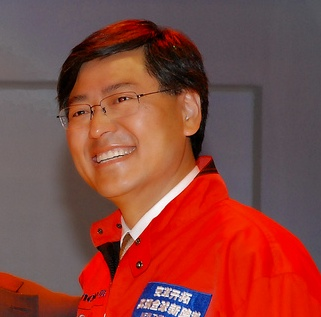
Yang in April 2007

Yang spotted a newspaper advertisement for jobs at Lenovo while in Beijing performing research for his master's degree at the University of Science and Technology of China. Yang had initially planned on becoming a university professor but took a risk and accepted a position with Lenovo in sales. He was paid the equivalent of US$30 per month.

In 1989, Yang joined Legend, as Lenovo was then known, at the age of 25. He was quickly promoted. Yang travelled to meet distributors throughout China and used his technical knowledge to achieve a strong sales record. Yang also stood out at Lenovo for being a quiet, deep thinker. These qualities caught the attention of Liu Chuanzhi, who later promoted Yang to head Lenovo's personal computer business at just 29 years old. Yang was elevated to CEO of the whole company when Liu retired in 2001. Liu described Yang as "A man who moves forward, takes risks and aims to innovate." Liu also said, "I had been observing Yang a long time before I appointed him to take over the PC business. He had clear goals, was broad-minded and straightforward. We trusted him."

Yang's first major task at Lenovo was to write a bid to become an IBM reseller. After submitting his bid, Yang discovered that he had quoted twice the price of his competitors. Within a year of joining Lenovo in 1988, Yang had lost interest in sales and had taken the TOEFL in preparation to study overseas. Yang stayed on after repeated requests from Liu Chuanzhi. Yang believed that he would benefit from exposure to American business practices but Liu persuaded him to delay his plans for two years. Problems at Legend due to lower import duties on personal computers did not allow for this, though.

Yang decided on Lenovo implementing specific job descriptions with clear responsibilities and a system of performance evaluations used to determine annual bonuses. At the time, most Chinese enterprises distributed bonuses of equal size to all employees, there was little sense of responsibility, and workers passively waited for superiors to issue instructions. When Yang took over Lenovo's personal computer division, he strongly discouraged the use of formal titles and required staff to address each other by their given names. Yang even required managers to stand outside their offices each morning to greet their employees while carrying signs with their first names. Yang's division moved to a new building in 1997. He used the move to break Lenovo's cultural links to the past. He insisted on a more formal dress code and training all employees in telephone etiquette; Yang wanted his people to think and act like high-tech workers in developed markets.

After addressing human resources issues, Yang moved on to distribution. Due to China's large territory, large population, varying degrees of economic development, and widely different local regulations, Lenovo was having difficulty operating nationwide. While Lenovo had been using direct sales and a network of distributors, Yang gave up on direct sales in favor of exclusively using independent agents to avoid the costs of administering a complex sales network. This action resulted in Lenovo cutting its sales staff from over 100 to just 18 in 1994. To gain confidence among distributors, Lenovo provided a wide range of products, offered reasonable prices, and closely supervised the marketing of its products to look out for the interests of distributors. In contrast to Lenovo, foreign firms often tried to squeeze distributors' margins. Yang ensured proper training of distributors and brought in Microsoft and Intel to help with these efforts. Yang also set up a system to monitor the sales, inventory, cash flow, compliance, and pricing of distributors. Many analysts cite Lenovo's distribution system and after sales service as the key to its expansion.

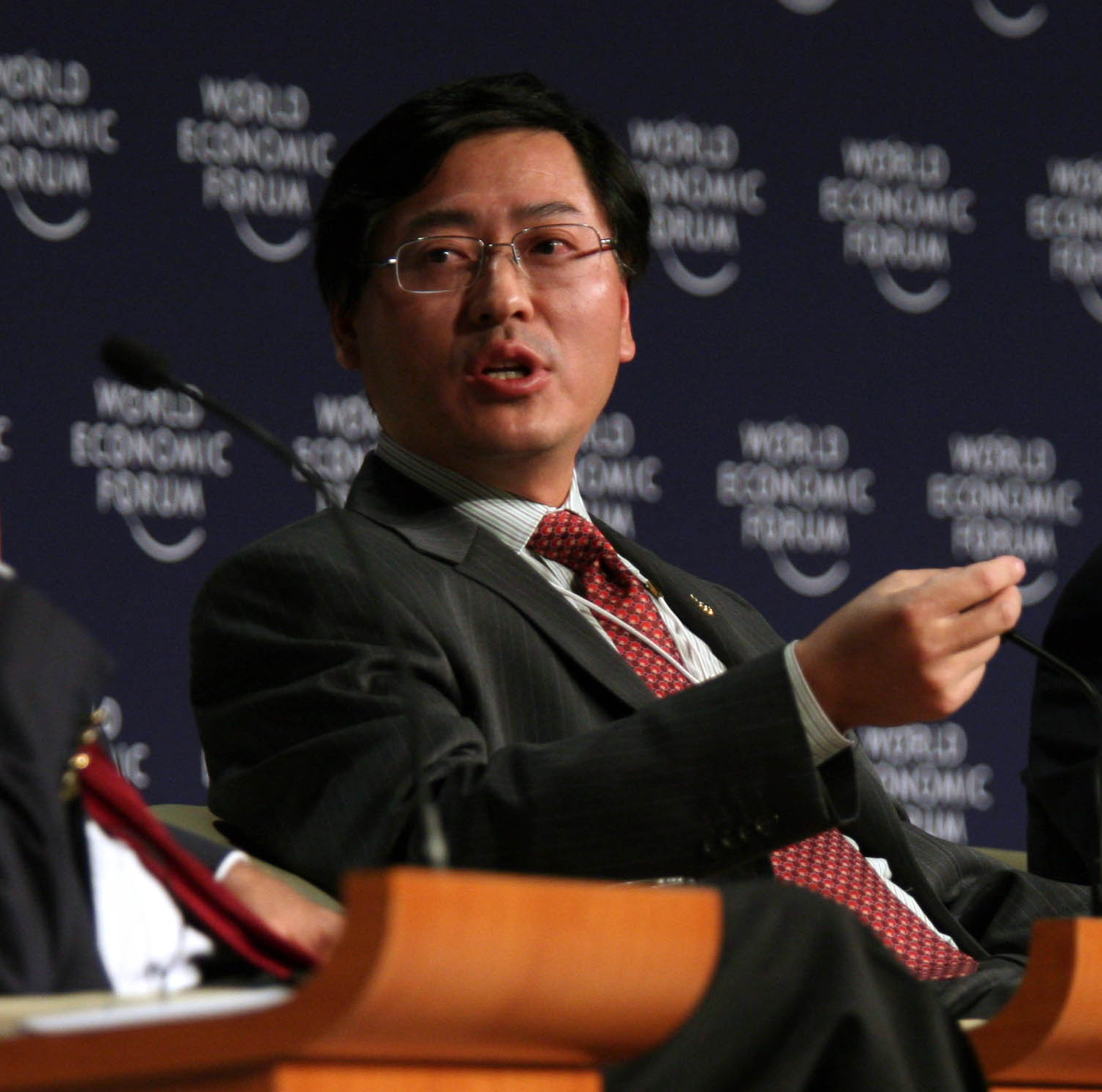
Yang Yuanqing in 2008

Yang Yuanqing was chairman of Lenovo's board from 2004 to 2008. In February 2009, Yang gave up his position as chairman and again became CEO at Lenovo.

In 2005, Yang Yuanqing undertook a deal with Microsoft to have Windows preloaded on most Lenovo computers sold in China. In exchange, Microsoft China offered a rebate on Windows and marketing assistance. Other manufacturers adopted this approach afterwards, partly due to Yang's substantial influence in China's technology industry. Microsoft tripled its sales of preloaded versions of Windows within a year as a result. The change was requested by Bill Gates and Steve Ballmer to combat what they referred to as a rise in the number of pirated versions of Windows. These versions were predominantly being installed on the hard drives of computers with no bundled operating system. Steve Ballmer said, "Yuanqing made a huge difference. He was willing to go out on a limb."

Yang also proved to be effective at navigating American politics. In early 2006, the U.S. State Department was harshly criticized for purchasing 16,000 computers from Lenovo. Critics attempted to smear Lenovo as controlled by the Chinese government and a potential vehicle for espionage against the United States. Yang spoke out forcefully and publicly to defend Lenovo. He said, " We are not a government-controlled company." He pointed out that Lenovo pioneered China's transition to a market economy and that in the early 1990s had fought and beaten four state-owned enterprises that dominated the Chinese computer market. Those firms had the full backing of the state while Lenovo received no special treatment. The State Department deal went through.

Yang worried that fears about Lenovo's supposed connections to the Chinese government would be an ongoing issue in the United States. Yang worked to ease worries by communicating directly with Congress. In June 2006, Yang arranged to be seated next to C. Richard D'Amato, a member of the congressional committee that had earlier raised concerns about the security of Lenovo's products. D'Amato later stated that he was impressed with Yang's candor. The issue soon faded away.

While Lenovo's working language in its U.S. operational centre in Morrisville is English, Yang initially did not understand the language well; he relocated his family to Morrisville to improve his language skills and soak up American business culture. Yang also hired a private tutor and watched cable news to practice. Yang also sent many Lenovo executives to the U.S. for long postings. One American Lenovo executive interviewed by The Economist praised Yang for his efforts to make Lenovo a friendly place for foreigners to work. As of 2013, Lenovo's top 14 executives come from seven countries. Lenovo has acquired companies all over the world. The company has a U.S. operational centre in Morrisville, North Carolina, the former home of IBM's personal computer business.

Yang has created a "performance culture" instead of the traditional Chinese work style of "waiting to see what the emperor wants." Yang holds an annual banquet at his home in Beijing for Lenovo's top executives. Traditionally, each guest at the banquet stands up and uses a toast to set goals for their business unit. Yang has said that when Lenovo enters a new market they intend to be number one. Yang stated, “If you don’t have enough scale, if you don’t have enough volume, it’s hard to make money. If you don’t have enough market share, it’s hard to make money. That’s why we enter the markets one by one. When we enter a market, we want to quickly get double-digit market share.”

In 2012, Yang received a US$3 million bonus as a reward for record profits, which he then redistributed to about 10,000 of Lenovo's employees. According to Lenovo spokesman Jeffrey Shafer, Yang felt that it would be the right thing to, "redirect [the money] to the employees as a real tangible gesture for what they done." The bonuses were mostly distributed among staff working in positions such as production and reception who received an average of CN¥2,000 or about US$314. This amount of money was almost equivalent to a month's pay for the typical Lenovo worker in China. Yang contributed another US$3.25 million bonus to 10,000 Lenovo employees in 2013. Employees in 20 countries benefited from Yang's gift. 85% of recipients were in mainland China. As in 2013, these workers were typically hourly production staff.

Shafer also said that Yang, who owns about eight percent of Lenovo's stock, "felt that he was rewarded well simply as the owner of the company." According to Lenovo's annual report, Yang earned US$14 million, including US$5.2 million in bonuses, during the fiscal year that ended in March 2012. Yang greatly increased his ownership stake in Lenovo by acquiring 797 million shares in 2011. Before, he owned only 70 million shares. Yang said, "While the transaction is a personal financial matter, I want to be very clear that my decision to make this investment is based on my strong belief in the company's very bright future. Our culture is built on commitment and ownership – we do what we say, and we own what we do. My decision to increase my holdings represents my steadfast belief in these principles."

In April 2015, Yang required all members of Lenovo's media team to be active on at least one social media outlet. Yang is an active user of Sina Weibo, Twitter and LinkedIn. Yang encourages his team to talk about their personal lives on social media. He said, "I cannot just promote a Lenovo product every day. I have to get people interested first and then find the opportunity to promote it once in awhile."

Yang is often referred to as "YY" by his colleagues at Lenovo.

== Awards and recognition ==
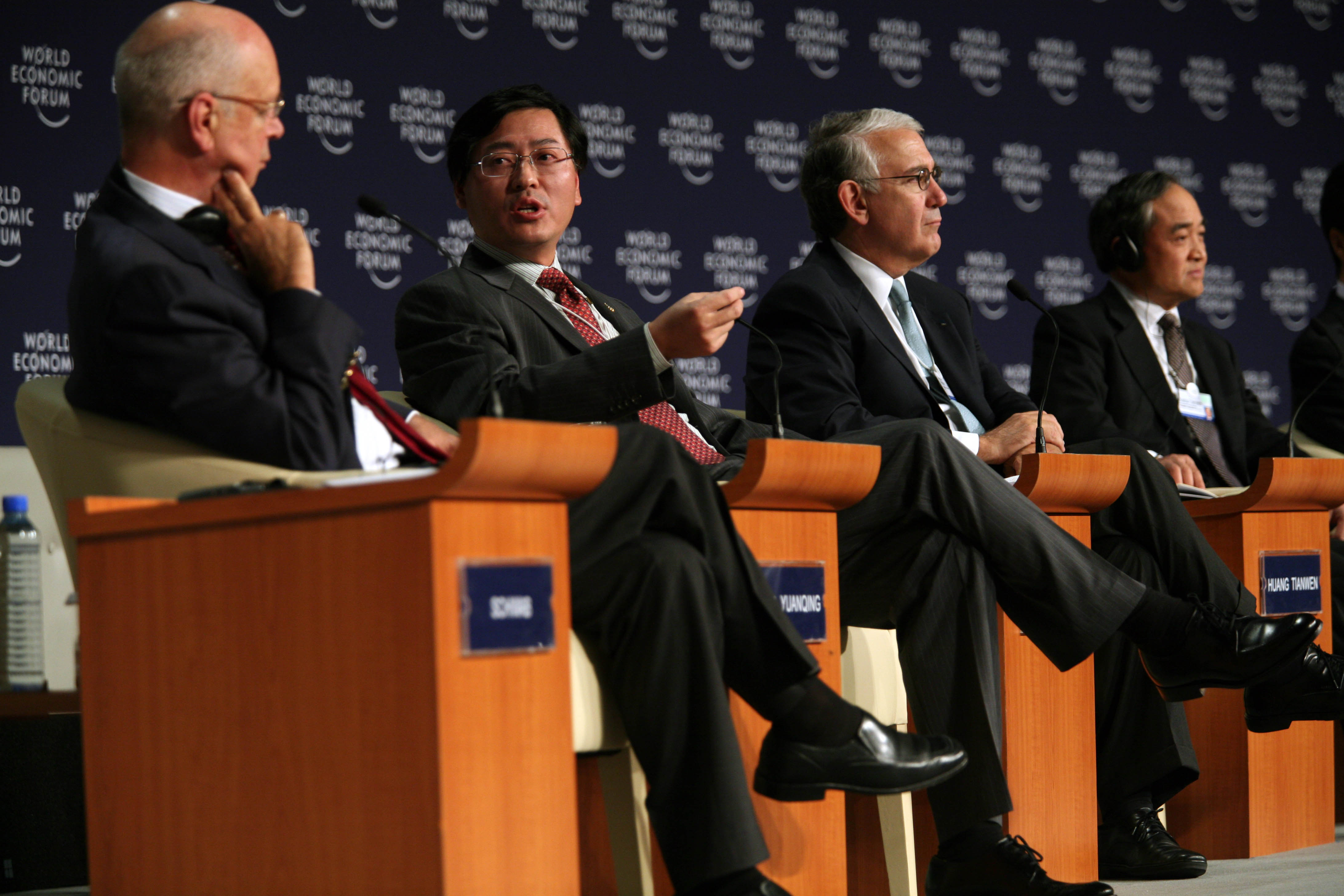
Flickr – World Economic Forum – Yang Yuanqing – annual meeting of the New Champions Tianjin 2008

Yang was awarded the May Fourth Youth Medal, by the All-China Youth Federation in 1999. In 1999 and 2001, the magazine BusinessWeek named him one of the "Stars of Asia." In 2004, he was listed among "Asia's 25 Most Influential Business Leaders" by Fortune Asia. Yang was named "2007 Chinese Business Leader" by Fortune China. In 2008, Forbes Asia named Yang "Businessman of the Year." In 2011, Finance Asia named Yang the "Best CEO in China."

In December 2012, Yang was named one of the "2012 CCTV China Economic Figures" in a televised award ceremony of CCTV. Yang received the same award in 2004. During the ceremony Yang said, "I have a dream that Lenovo will become the pride of China in the IT industry. Lenovo is my life's struggle and career, I have invested all of my energy into it. I firmly believe that Lenovo, a product of China, will stand atop the world's stage. As you can now see, our dream is being realized step-by-step."

On 1 May 2014, Yang received the 2014 Edison Achievement Award in San Francisco at the annual Edison Awards Gala. Yang shared the award with Elon Musk of Tesla Motors and SpaceX. The Edison Awards honor innovation in science and technology and recognize individuals for their “broad contributions to technical innovation.” Yang was the first person from East Asia ever to receive the award. Past winners include Steve Jobs, Ted Turner, Doug Ivester, and Martha Stewart. In 2015, Yang was listed on Forbes billionaire list.

Yang was selected to accompany the General Secretary of the Chinese Communist Party Xi Jinping on a state visit to the United States in September 2015.

In 2016, he became a laureate of the Asian Scientist 100 by the Asian Scientist.

== Public service, philanthropy, and other activities ==
Yang serves on the National Committee of the Chinese People's Political Consultative Conference, China's top governmental advisory body that includes more than 2,000 of China's elites from all sectors of society. In 2014, he pushed for legislation to protect privacy and personal data on the web and electronic devices. Yang said that while the internet has brought many advances it also brings new challenges such as protecting privacy and securing personal information. Yang said that legal loopholes and widespread corruption create major challenges to securing personal data. Yang made his proposal at the advisory body's annual meeting.

Yang also serves on the board of Communist Youth League of China, as director of the China Entrepreneurs' Association, and as a member of the New York Stock Exchange's International Advisory Committee. Yang also teaches as a guest lecturer at the University of Science and Technology of China. Additionally, Yang is a director of Baidu, and sits on the board of visitors of the Fu Foundation School of Engineering and Applied Science at Columbia University.

In March 2015, Yang joined the CEO Roundtable on Cancer, an international non-profit group founded in 2001, focused on preventing cancer and advancing research that promotes improved patient outcomes. The group is known for its "CEO Cancer Gold Standard," a workplace wellness program that promotes risk reduction, early detection, and effective treatment. Yang publicly pledged to implement this standard at Lenovo.

In October 2015, the University of North Carolina announced a donation of US$1 million from Yang Yuanqing to fund biomedical research. Yang's donation funds grants of US$75,000 per scholar. The first recipients were Jonathan Berg, an associate professor of genetics and medicine; Maureen Su, an associate professor of pediatrics, microbiology and immunology; and Yisong Wan, an associate professor of microbiology and immunology.
