= Lenovo Vibe X =

Android smartphone

The Lenovo Vibe X is an Android smartphone with a 5-inch screen announced at IFA 2013 in Berlin.

== Launch ==
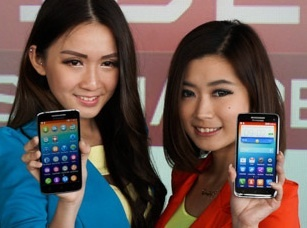
The Vibe X presented by models at launch.

The Vibe X was unveiled at the IFA 2013 show in Berlin. Lenovo says that the Vibe X will be released in China in October 2013 and in other countries in December of the same year. Lenovo does not expect to release the phone in Europe. Lenovo hopes that the Vibe X will help it expand its smartphone market share outside of China.

== Design and performance ==
The Vibe X's main feature is a 5-inch 1080p display made with scratch resistant Gorilla Glass 3 from Corning. At this size a 1080p display has a pixel density of 440 pixels per inch. The phone has a polycarbonate case that is 0.27 inches thick and has a laser-engraved texture. It weighs 4.1 ounces.

Vibe X comes with a 13-megapixel primary camera and a front-facing camera of 5-megapixel with an 84-degree field of view. The device is powered by a 1.5 GHz quad core MediaTek 6589T processor along with 2 GB of RAM and a 16 GB of internal storage. Battery life is rated at six hours of video viewing and eight hours of web browsing. The operating system is Android 4.2. A custom Facebook app comes pre-loaded.

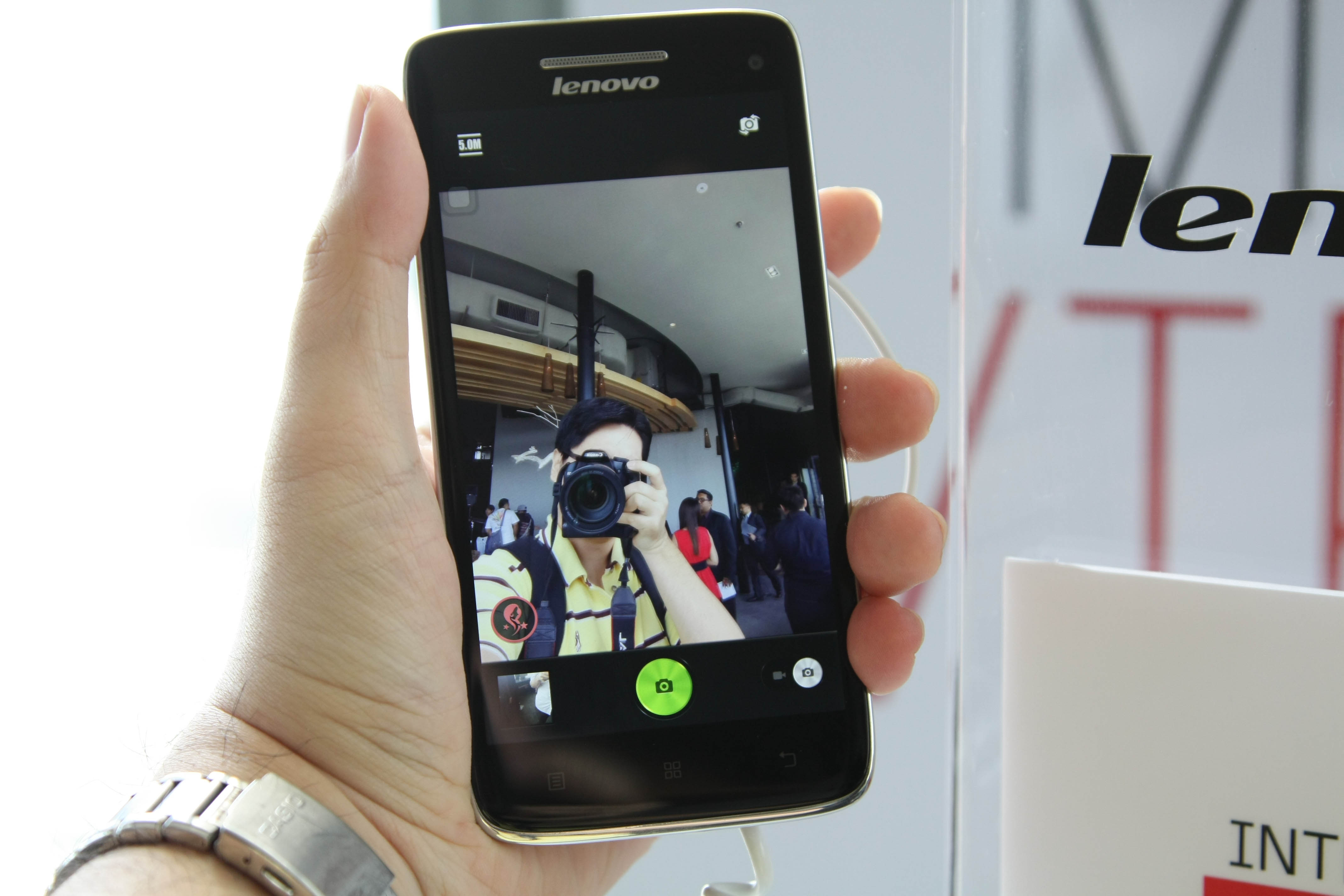
The Lenovo Vibe X with its camera app open.

== Reviews ==
In a review for the Times of India Javed Amwer wrote, "Vibe X is a good-looking device. In fact, it is more than good looking. It is incredibly thin and very light, especially for a phone that has a five-inch screen." Javed also wrote, "The frame around the screen is also made of tough plastic but has faux chrome finish. It is shiny and adds to the style of the device, though we are not sure how well the shine will hold up with the use. The volume rocker on the right and the power button on the left have chamfered edges. These buttons fit in their sockets snuggly and feel perfect." Javed concluded, "Vibe X has a great screen and a good design and the performance is also great."
