= Lenovo Z2 Plus =

Android-based smartphone

Lenovo Z2 plus
- Brand: Lenovo
- Manufacturer: Lenovo
- First released: January 2017
- Predecessor: ZUK Z1
- Operating system: Android 6.0.1 Marshmallow, upgradable to Android 8.0 Oreo
- CPU: 2.15GHz Qualcomm Snapdragon820
- GPU: Adreno 530 GPU
- Memory: 3/4 GB RAM
- Storage: 32/64 GB
- Battery: 3500 mAh
- Rear camera: 13 MP with LED flash
- Front camera: 8 MP
- Display: 5.0-inch, 1080 by 1920pixels
- Website: See bottom of article

The Lenovo Z2 Plus is a smartphone manufactured by Lenovo. It is a part of Lenovo's premium smartphone line in 2017, and has two variants. Lenovo Z2 Plus is the Indian version of Lenovo Zuk Z2, that was launched in China in May, 2016.

Lenovo Z2 Plus is a mid-range smartphone launched in January 2017. It comes with a 5-inch Full HD having a resolution of 1080 x 1920 pixels with a pixel density of 441 ppi. The phone runs on a 2.15 GHz Quad core Qualcomm Snapdragon 820 processor and it comes with 4 GB RAM. 4 GB of RAM ensures the phone runs smoothly with multiple applications open simultaneously. The Lenovo Z2 Plus also packs in a graphics processor, and 64 GB of internal storage and does not support expandable storage.

The Lenovo Z2 Plus originally ran on Android 6.0.1 "Marshmallow" and is powered by a 3500 mAh battery. It is a dual SIM smartphone, and connectivity options include GPS, HotSpot, WiFi, and Bluetooth. The rear camera on the Lenovo Z2 Plus is a 13 MP with Auto Focus, Face Detection, HDR, Panorama Mode, Geo-tagging, Touch Focus, Digital Zoom, and Video Recording. The smartphone also has a Front Facing Camera capable of shooting 8 MP.

== Specifications and configurations ==
This 5-inch device comes with an IPS display with Full HD resolution having a pixel density of 441 ppi. The body is made of Rollercage design with a fibreglass frame. It is available in two distinctive colors: Black and White. It features Adreno 530 GPU for handling high graphic demanding operations like Gaming, Virtual Reality, Augmented Reality. It comes with a maximum clockspeed of 2.15 GHz and features a Qualcomm Snapdragon 820, 64-Bit Custom Kryo Cores, Adreno 530 processor. Lenovo Z2 Plus comes in two configurations 3 GB DDR4 RAM / 32 GB ROM and 4 GB DDR4 RAM / 64 GB ROM. It weighs about 149grams and has a dimensions of 141.65mm x 68.88mm x 8.45mm.

The phone has an internal memory of 32 GB for a 3 GB RAM model and 64 GB for a 4 GB RAM model and cannot be expanded further. Lenovo Z2 Plus comes with a 3500mAh High Density Lithium polymer non-removable battery and supports fast charge. Z2 plus offers a large connectivity options like 4G, GPS with Glonass, WiFi, Hotspot, Bluetooth 4. 1, Dual SIM and USB Type C connectivity. Sensors like 3-axis gyro sensor, 3-axis electronic compass sensor, 3-axis Acceleration Sensor, Light Sensor, Hall Sensor (Proximity Sensor), Distance Sensor (Pedometer), Fingerprint recognition. The fingerprint uses a special technology called self learning fingerprint. It detects irregularities in the finger like skin peel, wound, dry skin, etc. and adjusts itself to identify the owner's fingerprint. For this purpose, it uses an advanced CAC Algorithm.

== Comparison ==
	Lenovo Zuk Z1 (2016)	Lenovo Z2 Plus (2017)
Internal storage	64 GB	64 GB
Display	5.5-inch	5.0-inch (441 ppi)
Processor	Snapdragon 801	Snapdragon 820
Memory	3 GB	3/4 GB
Rear camera	13 MP	13 MP
Front camera	8 MP	8 MP
Flash	Yes	Yes
Quick launch camera	Press power button twice	Press power button twice
Android version	5.1.1 Lollipop(at launch)	6.0 Marshmallow(at launch)
Removable battery	No, 4100 mAh	No, 3500 mAh
